= List of churches in Hampshire =

A list of churches and church buildings in Hampshire, England (including the unitary authorities of Southampton and Portsmouth) listed by borough:

== Basingstoke and Deane ==
- Sandham Memorial Chapel
- St Michael's Church, Basingstoke
- St Lawrence's Church, Weston Patrick
- RCCG Rehoboth Chapel, Basingstoke

== East Hampshire ==
- All Saints' Church, Alton
- Church of St Lawrence, Alton
- Church of St Mary and All Saints, Droxford
- All Saints Church, East Meon
- St Peter's Church, Petersfield
- St Mary's Church, Selborne

== Eastleigh ==
- St Mary's Church, Bishopstoke
- Emmanuel Baptist Church, Eastleigh
- King's Community Church
- Salvation Army, Eastleigh
- St John's Church, Hedge End
- St Nicolas' Church, North Stoneham

== Gosport ==
- Holy Trinity Church, Gosport
- Christ Church, Stoke Road
- Salvation Army, Gosport
- St Mary's, Alverstoke
- St Mary's, Rowner
- St. Thomas the Apostle, Elson
- St Faith's Church
- St Francis

== Hart ==
- All Saints Church, Crondall
- All Saints Church, Odiham

== New Forest ==
- Beaulieu Abbey

== Rushmoor ==
- Cathedral of St Michael and St George, Aldershot
- Church of St Michael the Archangel, Aldershot
- Royal Garrison Church (Aldershot)
- St Andrew's Garrison Church, Aldershot
- St Joseph's Church, Aldershot
- Holy Trinity Church, Aldershot
- New Testament Church of God, Aldershot
- St John's Church, Farnborough
- St Michael's Church, Farnborough

== Portsmouth ==
- ChristCentral Church Portsmouth
- Domus Dei
- Mountain of Fire and Miracles, Portsmouth
- Portsmouth Cathedral
- Salvation Army, Portsmouth
- Cathedral of St John the Evangelist, Portsmouth
- Southwick Priory

== Southampton ==
- Above Bar Church
- Avenue St Andrew's United Reformed Church
- Central Baptist Church
- Christ Church, Freemantle
- City Life Church
- Highfield Church
- Holyrood Church, Southampton
- Jesus Chapel, Peartree Green
- Salvation Army, Shirley
- Salvation Army, Sholing
- Shirley Baptist Church
- Shirley Parish Church
- St Alban's Church, Southampton
- St Edmund Church, Southampton
- St Joseph Church, Southampton
- St. Mark's Church, Woolston
- St. Mary's Church, Southampton
- St. Mary's Church, South Stoneham
- St. Mary's Presbyterian Church, Woolston (demolished 1972)
- St. Michael's Church, Southampton
- St. Michael and All Angels Church, Bassett
- St. Patrick's Church, Woolston
- Swaythling Methodist Church
- Church of the Ascension, Bitterne Park

== Test Valley ==
- Romsey Abbey

== Winchester ==
- New Minster, Winchester
- Old Minster, Winchester
- Winchester Cathedral
- Christ Church, Winchester
- Holy Trinity Church, Winchester
- Salvation Army, Winchester
- St John the Baptist Church, Winchester
- St Lawrence Church, Winchester
- St Swithun-upon-Kingsgate Church, Winchester
- Corhampton Church
- St Mary's Church, Micheldever
- St Mary's Church, Twyford
