= Charles Bullen =

Royal Navy Admiral (1769–1853)

Admiral Sir Charles Bullen GCB KCH
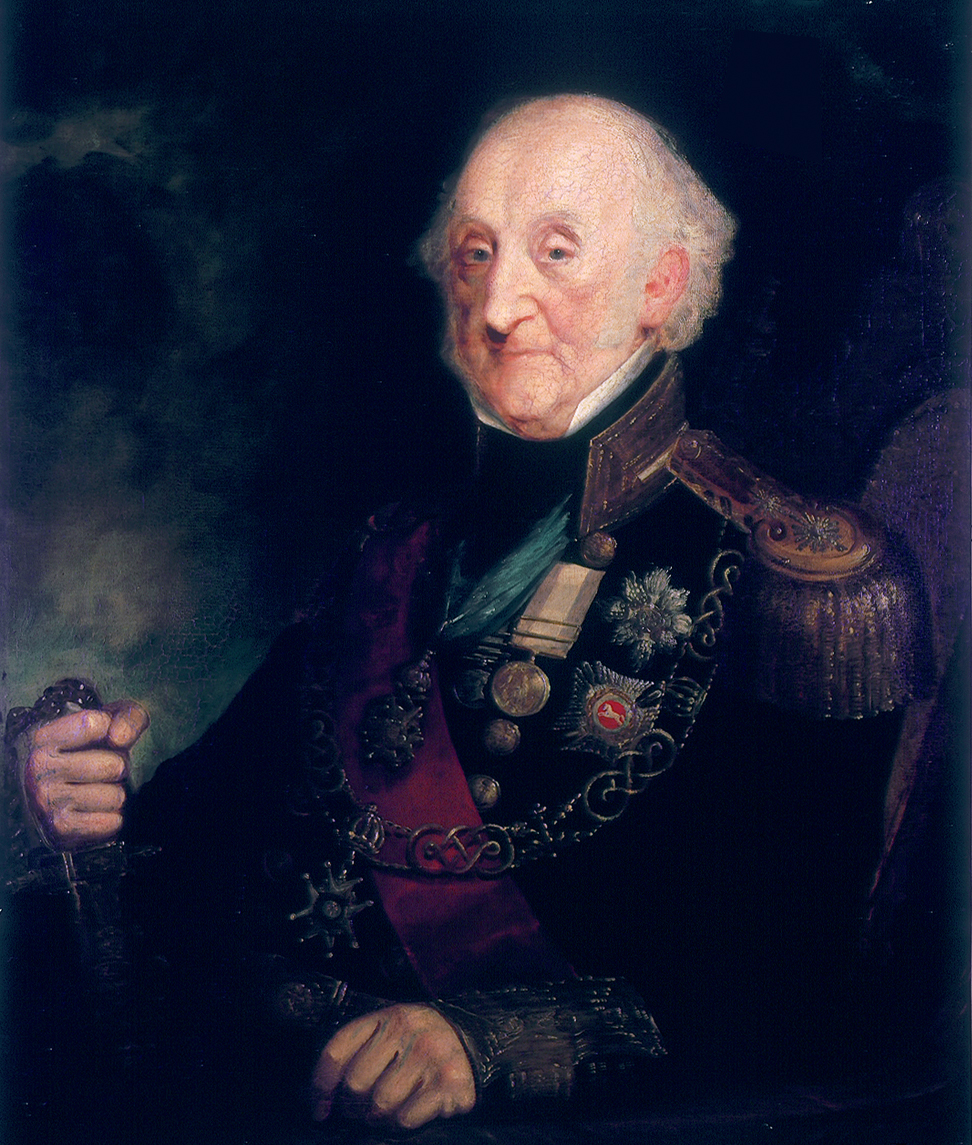
- Vice-Admiral Charles Bullen (A. Grant, 1849)
- Born: 10 September 1769; Newcastle, England
- Died: 28 February 1853 (aged 83); Shirley, England
- Military career
- Allegiance: United Kingdom
- Branch: Royal Navy
- Service years: 1779 to 1853
- Rank: Admiral
- Conflicts: French Revolutionary Wars; Glorious First of June; Napoleonic Wars; Battle of Camperdown; Battle of Trafalgar
- Awards: Lloyd's Patriotic Fund gold medal and sword Knight Grand Cross of the Order of the Bath; Knight Commander of the Royal Guelphic Order

Admiral Sir Charles Bullen GCB KCH (10 September 1769 – 2 July 1853) was a highly efficient and successful naval officer who served in the Royal Navy during the French Revolutionary and Napoleonic Wars and distinguished himself at the Glorious First of June, the battle of Camperdown and the battle of Trafalgar.

== Early life ==
Charles Bullen was born in Newcastle in 1769 but spent much of his early childhood in Weymouth, Dorset. His father, John Bullen, also served in the Royal Navy and was the Surgeon General on the North American Station between 1779 and 1781. Charles' mother, Ruth (née Liddel), was a cousin of Lord Eldon who served as Lord Chancellor of Great Britain between 1801 and 1806 and again between 1807 and 1827. Richard Bullen, Charles younger brother by 10 years, became a captain in the Scots Greys, dragoons. Charles entered the navy when he was just ten years old as a volunteer (1st class) aboard the 64 gun, third rate, HMS Europe.

== Career ==
=== American Revolutionary War ===
When his father was appointed Surgeon-General to the North American station in 1779, the 10-year-old Charles went with him aboard HMS Europe, which arrived in New York City on 25 August. On 23 December, Charles transferred to HM Sloop Loyalist and assisted in the capture of Charleston, South Carolina on 12 May 1780. He spent a short period aboard HMS Renown, which was dismasted in a gale while escorting a convoy to Quebec, before returning to Loyalist where he was promoted to Able Seaman and then Midshipman. Bullen returned to England in July 1781 aboard HM Sloop Halifax along with his father and Rear Admiral Arbuthnot, who had had some differences of opinion with Admiral Rodney.

=== Peace ===
Charles stayed ashore until 1786 and finished his schooling. At the age of 17, he joined HMS Culloden a 74-gun, third rate stationed in the Channel, in which he spent the next two years under Captain Sir Thomas Rich. In October 1789, he joined Rear Admiral Peyton aboard his flagship HMS Leander and began a spell of service in the Mediterranean that lasted two and a half years. Bullen was promoted to acting lieutenant on 9 January 1791 and the following month transferred to the frigate HMS Mercury. His promotion was confirmed when he joined the 24-gun, post ship, HMS Eurydice on 9 August. By the end of the year however, Bullen was back in England on half pay, during which time he married his cousin, a Miss Wood of Martock.

=== French Revolutionary War ===
When war broke out, Bullen returned to HMS Culloden, which was still under the command of Thomas Rich and sailed for the West Indies where they took part in the unsuccessful invasion of Martinique.^{[a]} Returning home in March 1794, Bullen transferred to HMS Ramillies in which he took part in the Atlantic campaign of May 1794 and the battle of the Glorious First of June. The captain, Henry Harvey, was subsequently promoted and replaced by Sir Richard Hussey Bickerton, who took the ship to the West Indies. Bullen continued to serve in Ramillies in the waters around the West Indies and Newfoundland until the end of 1795 when she returned to English waters, joining the North Sea Fleet under Admiral Duncan. Towards the end of 1796, Bullen re-joined Admiral Peyton in his then flagship, the 64-gun, third rate, Overyssel. This appointment didn't last long however and by Christmas, Bullen was again on half pay.

=== Mutiny ===
At the beginning of 1797, Bullen was appointed first lieutenant to HMS Monmouth and it was here he first met his new commanding officer, William Carnegie, 7th Earl of Northesk and the two became fast friends. During the Nore mutiny when rebellion broke out on the Monmouth, Bullen drew a line across the deck and threatened to shoot dead the first man to cross it. His prompt action probably saved his life and the lives of his fellow officers, including the Earl of Northesk, who was later chosen to take the rebels demands to the government. Carnegie, who had some sympathy with the rebels, resigned following suppression of the mutiny but Bullen remained on board under the new captain, James Walker and together they fought at the battle of Camperdown later that year, the crew of the Monmouth fighting hard to absolve themselves of their part in mutiny.

=== Camperdown ===
The battle of Camperdown took place on 11 October 1797. As the Monmouth was bearing down on the Dutch fleet, Captain Walker spoke to the crew, "My lads, you see your enemy; I'll lay you close aboard and give you an opportunity of washing the stain off your characters in the blood of your foes. Now go to your quarters and do your duty". Monmouth battled with two 50 gun Dutch ships, Alkmaar and Delft, capturing both in a brutal encounter. Bullen was placed in charge of the Delft, which he found to have been greatly damaged during the battle and leaking badly. 43 members of her crew had been killed, including the captain, and 76 injured. To add to Bullen's woes, on 14 November, a storm blew up. Unable to plug the leaks or pump the ship out, and with ten-foot of water in the hold, the decision was taken to abandon her. However, when the Delft's commanding officer, Lieutenant Heilburg, was invited into one of the longboats, he refused. Indicating the wounded, he asked, "How can I leave these unfortunate men?". Bullen agreed to stay behind and help evacuate the wounded but few could be got off. When the Delft suddenly sank, Heilburg went down with her but Bullen jumped into the sea, where he was later rescued. He was praised for marshalling the evacuation of the ship and controlling the survivors in the water until they could be rescued by the boats of HMS Veteran, HMS Russell and other neighbouring vessels. Bullen was promoted to commander^{[b]} for his actions and returned to his Dorset home on half pay, where he spent the next three and a half years with his wife and family.

=== Return to sea ===
In June 1801, Bullen was despatched in the sloop HMS Wasp to Sierra Leone, where a powerful allegiance of native tribal leaders were threatening British trade interests. He was rewarded with a promotion to post captain^{[c]} and returned to England in August 1802. When hostilities with France were renewed the following year, Bullen was given temporary command of HMS Minerve. The previous captain, Jahleel Brenton was injured when a block fell on his head, and Bullen, who was conveniently close by in Weymouth, commanded the vessel between 8 May and 3 June in 1803. Patrolling the waters off Cherbourg, Bullen captured 23 merchantmen and the frigate sent to protect them. Between 14 July 1803 and 15 May 1804, Bullen commanded the Plymouth division of Sea Fencibles, protecting the south-west of England from an invasion which, fortunately, never came. In November 1803, he was additionally given command of a flotilla which was being fitted out in the Thames for the defence of tidal estuaries and creeks. When Northesk was given the first rate flagship HMS Britannia in 1804^{[d]} he asked for Bullen as his flag captain especially. Initially serving with the Channel Fleet off Brest under William Cornwallis; Britannia was sent to join a squadron under Vice Admiral Robert Calder which, in August 1805, was sent to join Nelson off Cádiz.

=== Battle of Trafalgar ===
On 30 August, the Britannia joined the blockade of the Franco-Spanish fleet and so was present on 21 October for the battle of Trafalgar. On the day of the battle, Britannia, Prince and Dreadnought, being the slowest ships present, were ordered to "...take station as convenient". At this point Bullen and Northesk had a serious disagreement about the meaning of the order, with Bullen refusing to shorten sail. Britannia fell in 5th behind HMS Victory and, with no particular role allocated, attacked three ships, including the Bucentaure and the 130-gun Santissima Trinidad, before turning to pursue the enemy's flying van. After the battle, Britannia was still relatively undamaged, despite having suffered 52 casualties,^{[e]} and so she was able to aid other more seriously damaged ships in the storm which followed. Bullen brought three ships back to England and received prize money in excess of £3000, along with the usual awards from the Lloyd's Patriotic Fund of the gold medal and sword given to Trafalgar captains. His ship was paid off on 20 June, and Bullen spent the next 15 months on half pay.

=== Mediterranean service ===
Bullen was appointed to 38 gun frigate, HMS Volontaire on 7 September 1807 and spent the next three years helping to maintain the blockade of Toulon and in operations along the French and Spanish coasts including the conveyance of the Duc D'Orleans and his brother the Comte de Beaujolais to Malta. When Spain declared war on France in May 1808, Bullen was ordered to undertake an overland expedition from Fez to Tangiers to purchase arms for the Spanish rebels. In 1809 he undertook a series of raids along the French coast, capturing the island of Pomegues and destroying Fort Rioux near Cape Croisette. The latter action also led to the capture of five vessels sheltering under the 14 gun battery. Bullen also assisted in a boat action off Rosas, which resulted in the taking of seven merchantmen and their three armed escorts. On 13 December 1810, an amphibious assault on Palamós was forced to retreat and Captain Francis William Fane, was captured. Consequently, on 1 January 1811, Bullen took command of Fane's ship, HMS Cambrian. Bullen continued to support the Spanish in operations along the Catalan coast, destroying the shore batteries at Palamos and St Phillion in April that year. Returning to the bay of Rosas, Bullen captured 19 merchant vessels off Cadaques before sailing south to Tarragona in April, where, together with other ships from the squadron he aided the early defence during the siege, at one point risking running his ship aground by taking it close in shore to deliver broadsides on the enemy. Later, whilst serving in a battery ashore in Selva, he was badly wounded. Bullen quit Cambrian on 9 December and returned to England invalided.

=== Later service ===
Bullen did not go to sea again until 10 November 1814 when he was appointed to HMS Akbar as flag captain to Admiral Thomas Byam Martin, helping to supervise the partition of naval supplies at Antwerp. Bullen and the Akbar then proceeded to Halifax, Nova Scotia with Rear Admiral Edward Griffith. In June 1815, Bullen was made a companion of the Order of the Bath for his services. The Akbar was paid off on 1 January 1817.

After nearly seven years ashore, Bullen returned to active duty on 12 December 1823, when he was appointed commodore on the west coast of Africa. With his broad pennant in the fifth rate HMS Maidstone, he supported operations along the Gold Coast during the First Ashanti War. While defending the British depot at Cape Coast, his men were forced to strip the lead from the roof to cast extra bullets. In anti slave trade operations, Bullen was responsible for freeing almost 10,000 would be slaves before his return home in September 1827.

In July 1830, he was appointed a Commissioner of Navy for the Navy Board for Chatham Dockyard and then Pembroke Dockyard before being given command of the Royal Yacht Royal Sovereign. In 1835, Bullen became a Knight Commander of the Royal Guelphic Order,^{[f]} and was dubbed a Knight Bachelor.^{[g]} He gained promotion to rear admiral in January 1837^{[h]} and although he retired in March the same year^{[i]}, he continued to receive awards and promotions. Bullen was awarded the Knight Commander of the Order of the Bath^{[j]} in 1839, a good service pension of £300 a year in 1843 and was promoted to vice admiral in 1846.^{[k]} In 1852 he was made a Knight Grand Cross of the Order of the Bath^{[l]} followed by promotion to full admiral in July that year.^{[m]} Admiral Charles Bullen died aged 84 on 2 July 1853, the last surviving captain of the British fleet at Trafalgar.^{[n]}

== Notes ==
Footnotes

a 14–21 April 1793
b 2 January 1798
c 29 April 1802
d 8 May 1804
e 10 killed 42 wounded
f 13 January 1835
g 25 February 1835
h 10 January 1837
i 12 March 1837
j 8 April 1839
k 9 November 1846
l April 1852
m Admiral of the Blue, 30 July 1852. The Navy List (1853)
n Buried: St. Mary's Church, South Stoneham, Southampton. Wall plaque and painted hatchment: St. James's Church, Shirley, Southampton.

Citations
