= St James' Park, Southampton =

Recreational area

Coordinates: 50.927°N 1.430°W

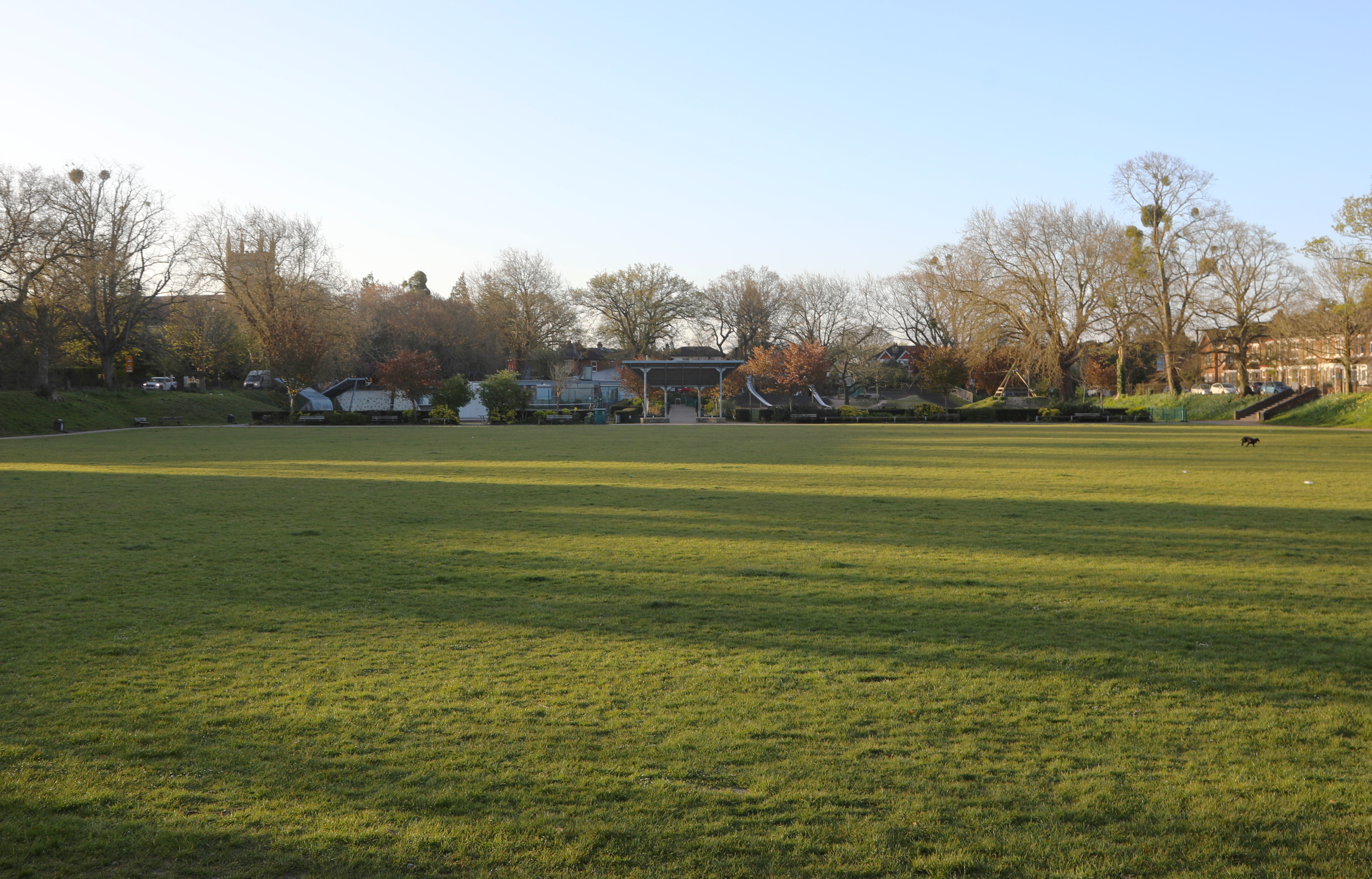
St James' Park

St James' Park, Southampton is a recreational area situated in the district of Shirley, Southampton opposite St James' Church, Southampton. It is adjacent to Winchester Road and surrounded by housing, some of it dating from the mid Victorian Period. It is supported by The Friends Of St James' Park (FOSJP) who run a cafe and organise community events.

The land now occupied by the park was gradually surrounded by housing as the suburb of Shirley, Southampton developed in the mid 1800s. At first it remained grazing land but eventually became a nursery and then a gravel pit. This last use has resulted in the park having a pleasant sunken appearance. In 1907 the land was purchased by the local authority and became a public park after landscaping in 1911.

A popular story grew up in Southampton that the park was to have been the site of a railway station on the unbuilt section of the Didcot, Newbury and Southampton Railway but plans deposited with Hampshire Record Office for this scheme show this not to have been the case. The planned route actually ran down from a tunnel in Chilworth near the current Chilworth Arms pub, through Lordswood and the site of the current Sports Centre, along the East Side of Dale Valley before turning under Winchester Road. It then passed to the North East of the park through land now occupied by Shirley Junior School before continuing along a course close to the present Wilton Road. Some land was purchased and work undertaken to the East of Hill Lane South of Archers Road, where The Dell (Southampton) was later built and an unused embankment still exists running towards Commercial Road

Archival research by the Shirley Local History Group, notably among the records of a local landowner revealed that a later revival of this scheme, the Southampton and Winchester Great Western Junction Railway, intended to use the park as the original route at this location had by then been developed. Plans and sections dated 1901 show the intended route of the railway as passing through the park from East to West. Records indicated that property sales were discussed for this scheme, which would have followed a slightly different route to the previous scheme in some areas without a tunnel at Chilworth. South of St James's Park at this time Didcot, Newbury and Station (now Stratton) Roads were named. Station Road also contains a police station. Nothing ultimately came of any of the railway schemes in this area, which finally petered out prior to World War One.
