= St Andrew's Garrison Church, Aldershot =

Church in Aldershot, Hampshire, England

Coordinates: 51°15′39″N 0°45′33″W

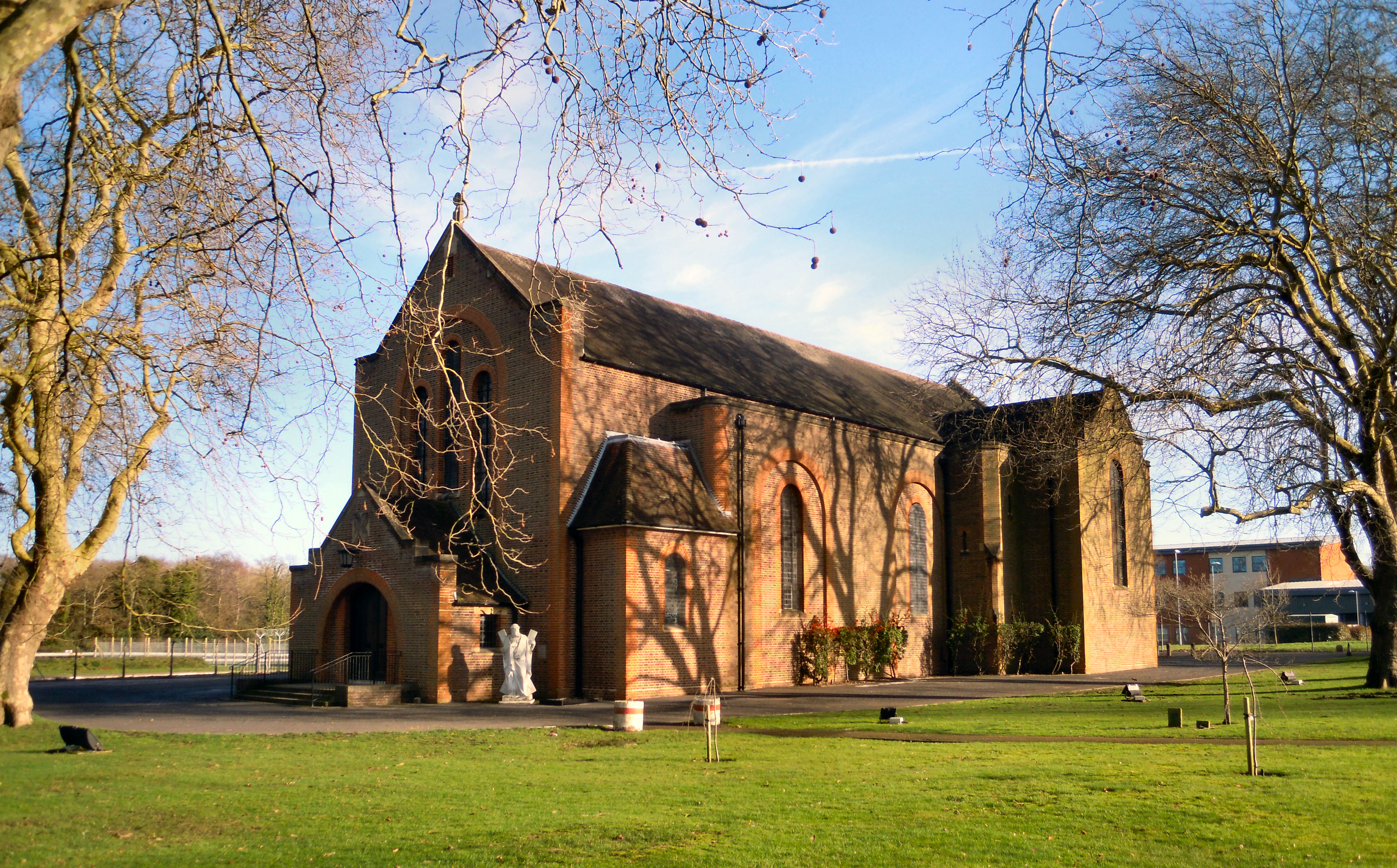
St Andrew's Garrison Church in Aldershot.

St Andrew's Garrison Church, situated at Queens Avenue, Aldershot, Hampshire (GU11 2BY) in southern England is a large army church designed in the late 1920s by the prominent Scottish architect Sir Robert Lorimer (1864–1929).

== History ==
During the 1920s Sir Robert Lorimer designed a number of war memorials, including the Scottish National War Memorial at Edinburgh Castle. St Andrew's Garrison Church was built as a memorial to those who lost their lives in the First World War, also known as the Great War. A plaque in the porch of St Andrew's states that:

"This church was built to the glory of God in thankful remembrance of the soldiers of the Church of Scotland and kindred churches throughout the empire who laid down their lives in the Great War 1914–1918."

== Church of Scotland links ==
As an army church, St Andrew's is not officially classed as a Church of Scotland church. However, historically most of its ministers have been ordained Church of Scotland ministers. Additionally the church uses the standard Church of Scotland format for its services and the Church of Scotland hymn book, "Church Hymnary 4".

=== Congregation ===
The congregation is not restricted to the military and services are open to civilians.

== History of the church buildings ==
=== Army camp established, 1854 ===
An army camp was established at Aldershot in 1854. Two churches were quickly erected in that camp the following year. By 1856 a third church was needed and a portable structure known as the "Iron Church" was erected. In 1866 the Iron Church was transferred from its previous location near Thornhill Road, Aldershot to Queen's Avenue, Aldershot, close to where St Andrew's Garrison Church is sited today.

=== Iron Church ===
The Iron Church was used jointly by the Church of Scotland and the Church of England ministers until 1893. In that year St George's Garrison Church was built by the Army for the Anglicans. From then on, until its demolition in 1926, the "Iron Church" was just used by the Church of Scotland ministers. In 1908, Rev. J. T. Bird, the Chaplain at that time, asked that the Iron Church should be named after the patron saint of Scotland, Saint Andrew. The War Office agreed to this request.

=== Fundraising ===
Following the First World War money was raised to replace the Iron Church with a permanent structure which would also serve as a memorial for Church of Scotland and other Presbyterian soldiers who had been killed in that war.

=== Design of church ===
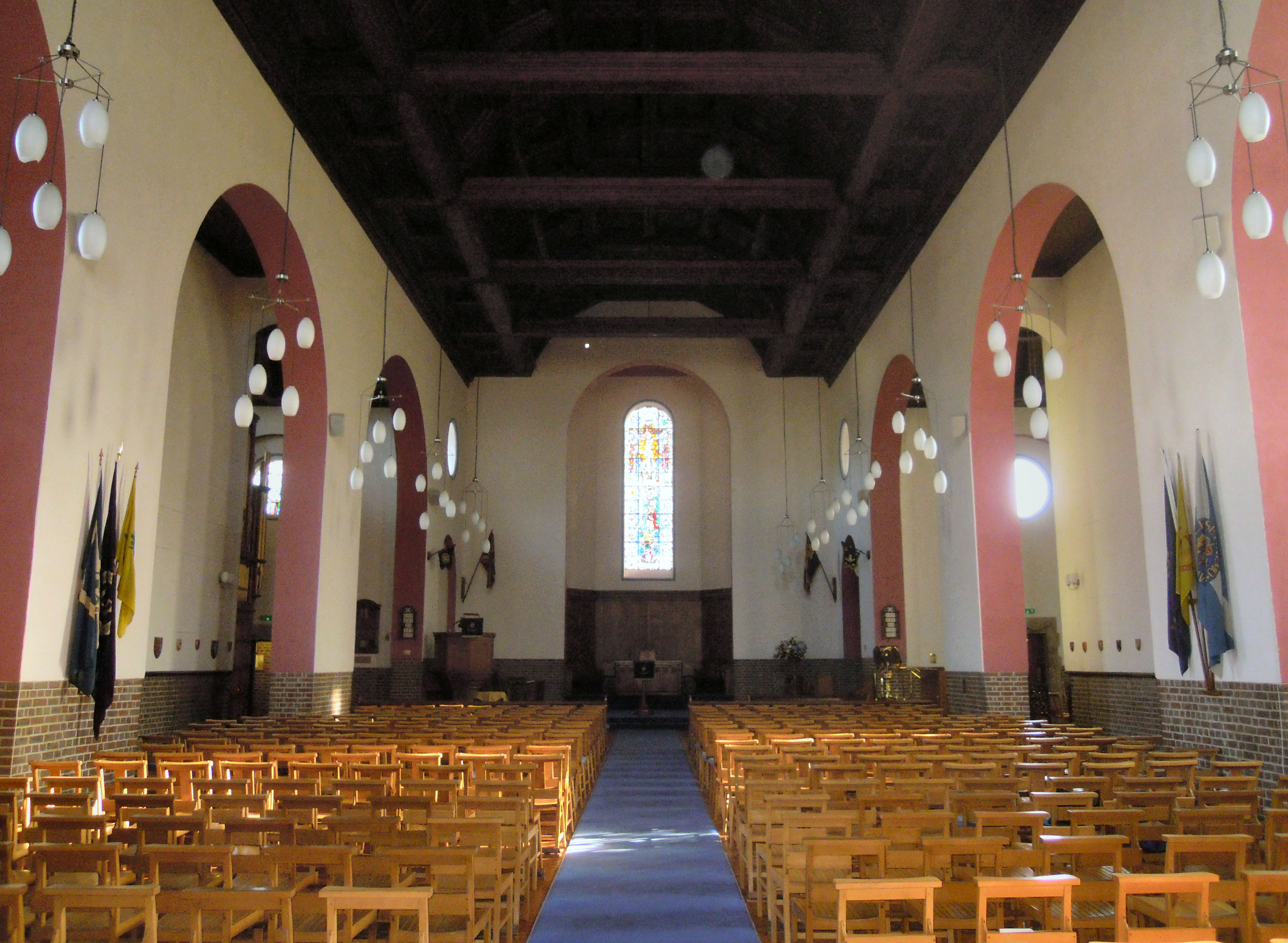
View down the nave to the chancel

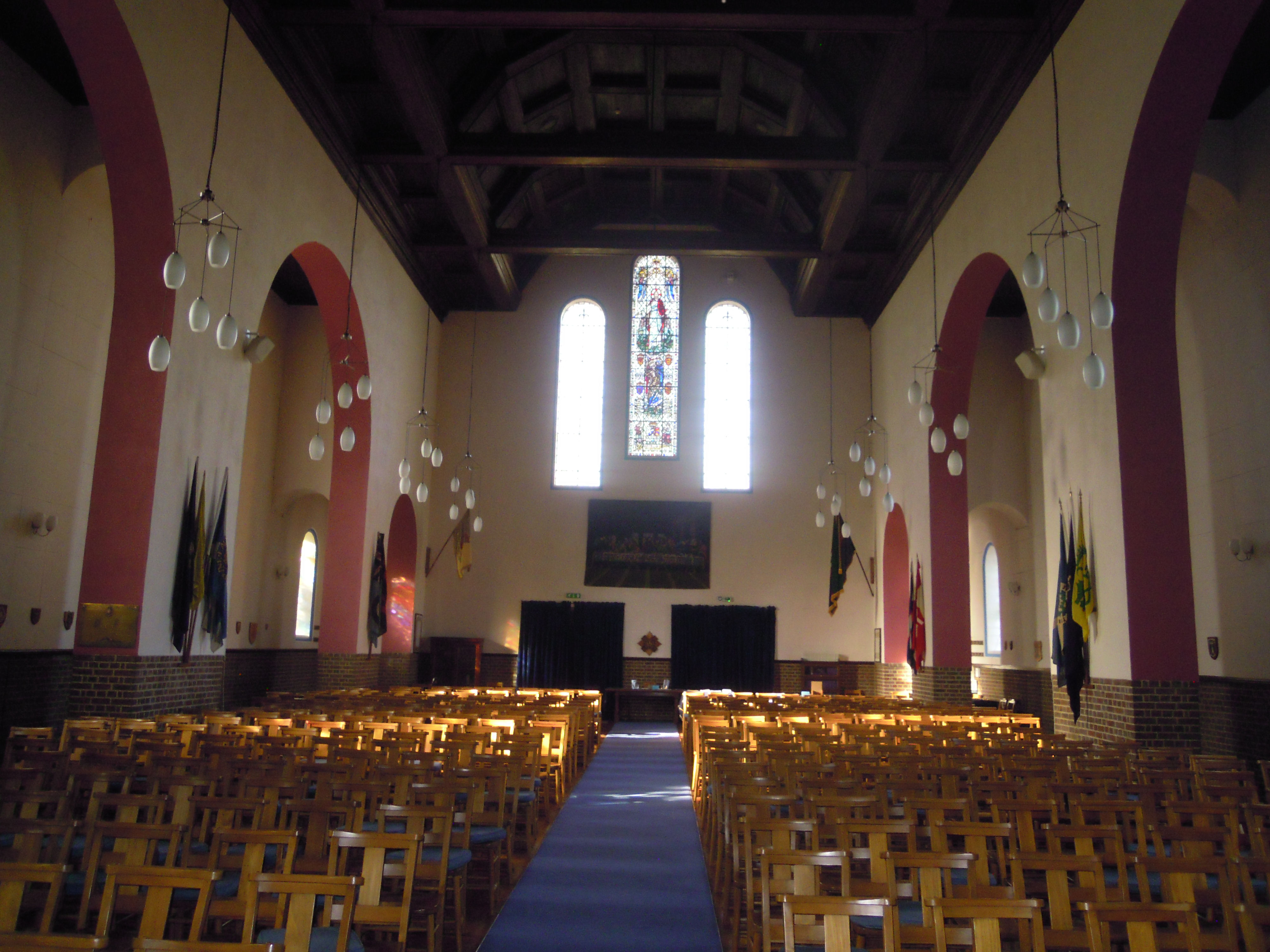
View West down the nave

This new church was designed by Sir Robert Lorimer. However, due to cost constraints the nave was initially built slightly shorter than Lorimer had originally planned. Externally the building is predominately brown brick. Its doorways, windows and corner points highlighted with a red brick. Internally, the layout is a standard East facing cross, save that at the East end of the church there is an octagonal apse.

=== Official opening, 1927 ===
The newly erected St Andrew's Garrison Church was formally opened by Princess Mary, Colonel in Chief of The Royal Scots, on the morning of Saturday 10 December 1927. However within a few years the church was proving to be too small for army ceremonial services. By 1938 enough money had been raised to extend the nave. In particular large donations came from the Trustees of St Andrew's Scottish Soldiers' Club; the Church of Scotland and The Treasury. John F. Matthew, the architectural partner of the by now deceased Sir Robert Lorimer, was commissioned to do the design work. This involved extending the nave by 30 feet, similar to what Lorimer had originally intended in 1926 and reducing the height of the bell tower.

=== Extension, 1939 ===
On Sunday 5 February 1939, the extended St Andrew's Garrison Church was reopened and rededicated in the presence of King George VI and Queen Elizabeth.

=== Ancillary buildings, 1950s ===
The 1950s saw the erection of a complex of ancillary buildings next to the church on its north east side providing a hall, kitchen, offices, toilets and storage for the church. They are of a fairly utilitarian 1950s design. Other than the hall, where rough cast is widely used on the exterior, these ancillary buildings were built with a darkish red brick similar to that used in places on the main church building. The church hall is dedicated to the remembrance of members of the "Church of Scotland and kindred presbyterian churches who gave their lives" in World War II.

=== Statue of St Andrew ===
Statue of St Andrew outside the Garrison Church

Following the closure of the Royal Caledonian School, Bushey, Hertfordshire in the 1990s, a statue of St Andrew by J. G. Bubb, which had been at that school, was donated to the church. The statue now stands outside the front of church, to the south of the porch. A new marble base was added to the statue around 2003/4.

=== Listing ===
In 2006 the church building was listed by Rushmoor Borough Council. Listing gives extra protection to a building against alteration or demolition of the structure.

== Interior ==
=== Nave ===
The interior is dominated by a large nave with seating for around four hundred and twenty. There are no balconies. Two arched aisles run between the nave and the side walls.

=== Cameron Chapel ===
The south wing, or transept, was converted to a small chapel in 1975. Initially called St Andrew's Chapel, this has come to be known as the Cameron Chapel. The Cameron name relates to the presence of a large stained glass window given by the Cameron Highlanders to the church, in 1930, which can be found in this part of the building, plus accompanying plaque and a regimental flag. A new communion table and plinth were specially commissioned for the opening of the chapel in 1975.

=== Organ ===
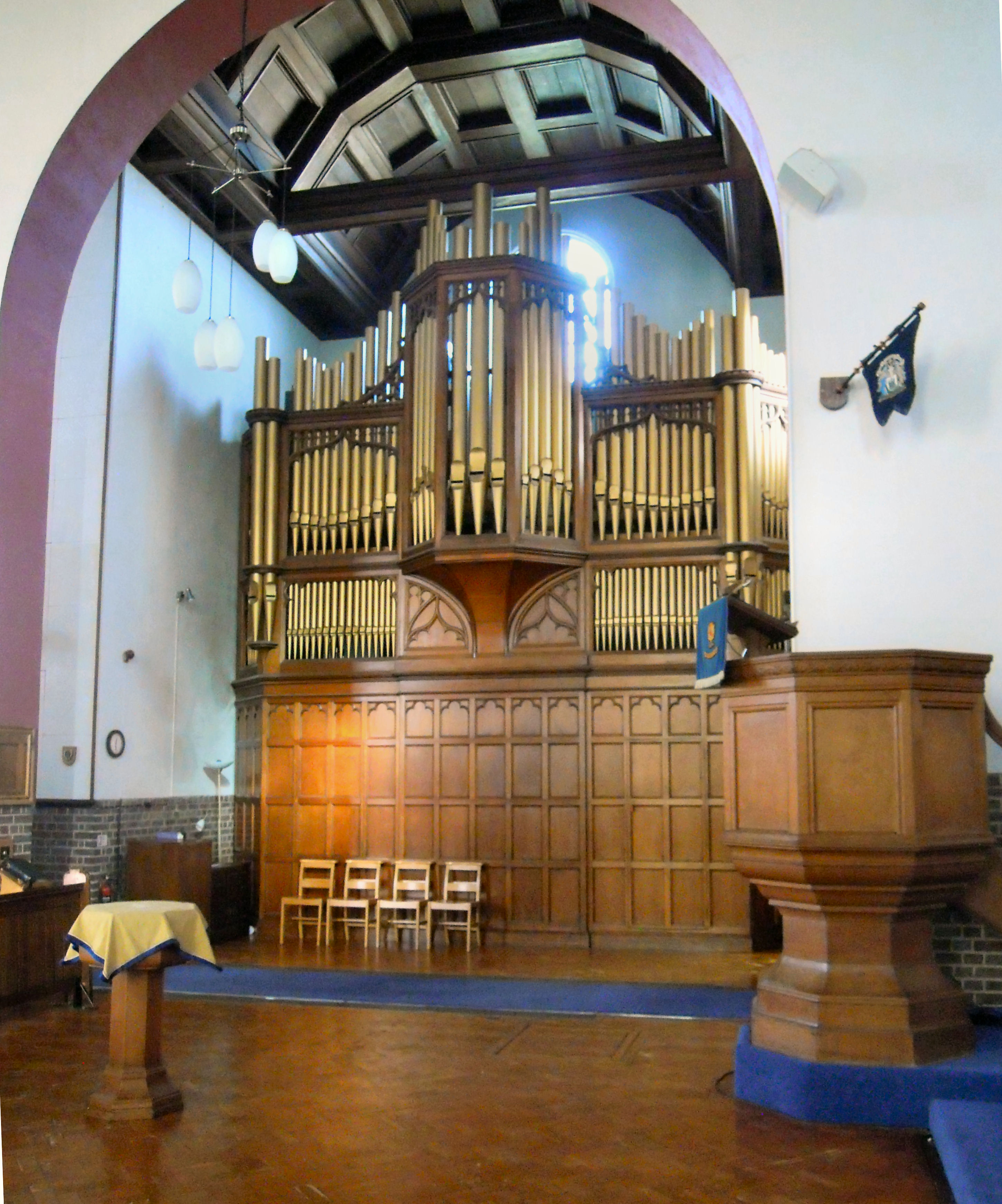
The organ dates to 1897

The north wing or transept is dominated by a large organ. The organ itself is older than the church buildings and dates from 1897. It originally resided in St Ninian's Church of Scotland, Leith. In 1984, the organ was restored and installed in St Andrew's Garrison Church, following the merger of St Ninian's Church with North Leith and Bonnington Church to form North Leith Parish Church.

== Monuments ==
The church contains a number of monuments and stained glass. Some of these originated in the church while others have been transferred here over time.

Stone showing crest of Gordon Highlanders. It is one of twelve carved by German prisoners of war, held in Egypt, in the Second World War.

=== Egyptian stones ===
These include 12 stones set into the wall of the Cameron chapel. The stones were carved by German Prisoners of War, held in Egypt in World War II. Initially the stones were placed in an overseas British army church, St Andrew's Kirk, Geneifa, Egypt. Ten of the stones display the regimental cap badges of Scottish Regiments based in the Canal Zone. Two stones show medical badges used in the British Army at the time. When the British Army left Egypt in the mid-1950s the church closed and the stones were, a few years later, transferred to St Andrew's, Aldershot.

=== War memorials and regimental crests ===
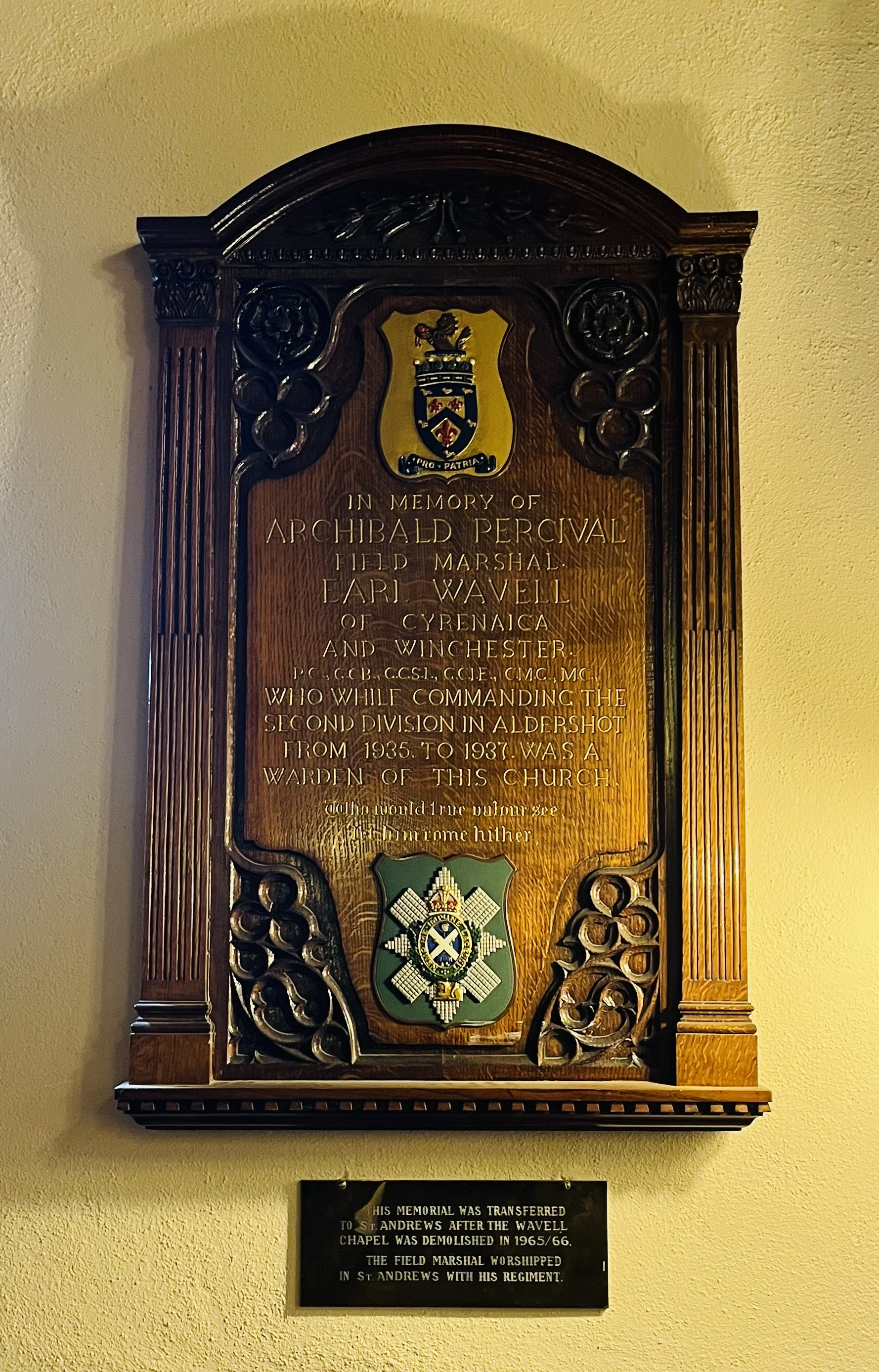
Wall monument to Field Marshall, Lord Wavell

Other memorials transferred to the church include:

- two war memorials from the First World War originally in Aldershot Presbyterian Church which can now be found in the porch of St Andrews;
- a monument to Field Marshal, Lord Wavell, originally in the Wavell Memorial Chapel, which ceased to be used as a place of worship in 1965–66;
- and a window with stained glass showing regimental crests, mainly of Scottish regiments, made up of a number of smaller stained glass windows the bulk of which came from the Church of Scotland Canteen, in Aldershot, which was knocked down in the late 1960s.

Lower half of Haig Memorial Window showing a group mourning. Beneath them a kilted soldier kneels before a grave.

=== Stained glass ===
The rest of St Andrew's stained glass was commissioned for the church. There is a large stained glass window in the apse of the church to the memory of Field-Marshal, Earl Haig as well as glass commemorating the Cameron Highlanders and I Corp. Additionally a number of stained glass windows have been given in memory of individual members of the congregation.

The church's two largest stained glass windows, namely those dedicated to I Corp and Earl Haig, were both designed by Walter Cook of Edinburgh, in the early to mid-1930s. They have similar themes as both are dominated by Jesus, as saviour and figure of peace, with arms outstretched, underneath him being a small group of grieving people drawing attention to the cost of war in general and the First World War in particular.
