= Shirley Baptist Church, Southampton =

Baptist church in Southampton, Hampshire, England

Coordinates: 50.922937°N 1.432976°W

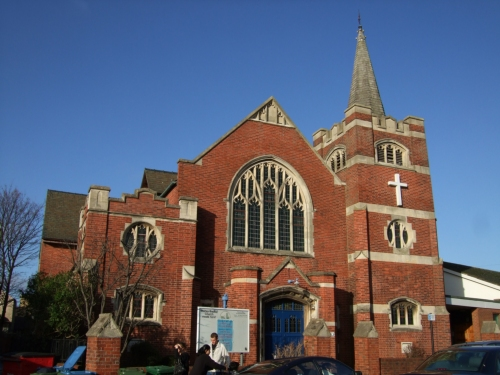
Shirley Baptist Church, Southampton UK

Shirley Baptist Church is a Baptist church in Southampton. The main church building is situated along Church Street in the district of Shirley. Founded in 1852, the church is a member of the Baptist Union of Great Britain.

== History ==
The original church building was constructed in 1852 on waste ground in Church Street. Under leadership of Rev Edgar Pullen between 1889 and 1930, the church increased in size, with nearly 500 members by the end of his ministry. The present church building was constructed during the First World War to accommodate the larger congregation, opening in 1915.

== Notable members and attendees ==
The noted economist John Harry Dunning briefly attended Shirley Baptist when he first moved to Southampton, in 1952, while lodging in a nearby home. Eventually, however, he moved on to Thornhill Baptist Church where his new accommodation was located, and where he remained for the next 14 years.
