= St Joseph's Church, Southampton =

Coordinates: 50.89925°N 1.4057°W

St Joseph's Church
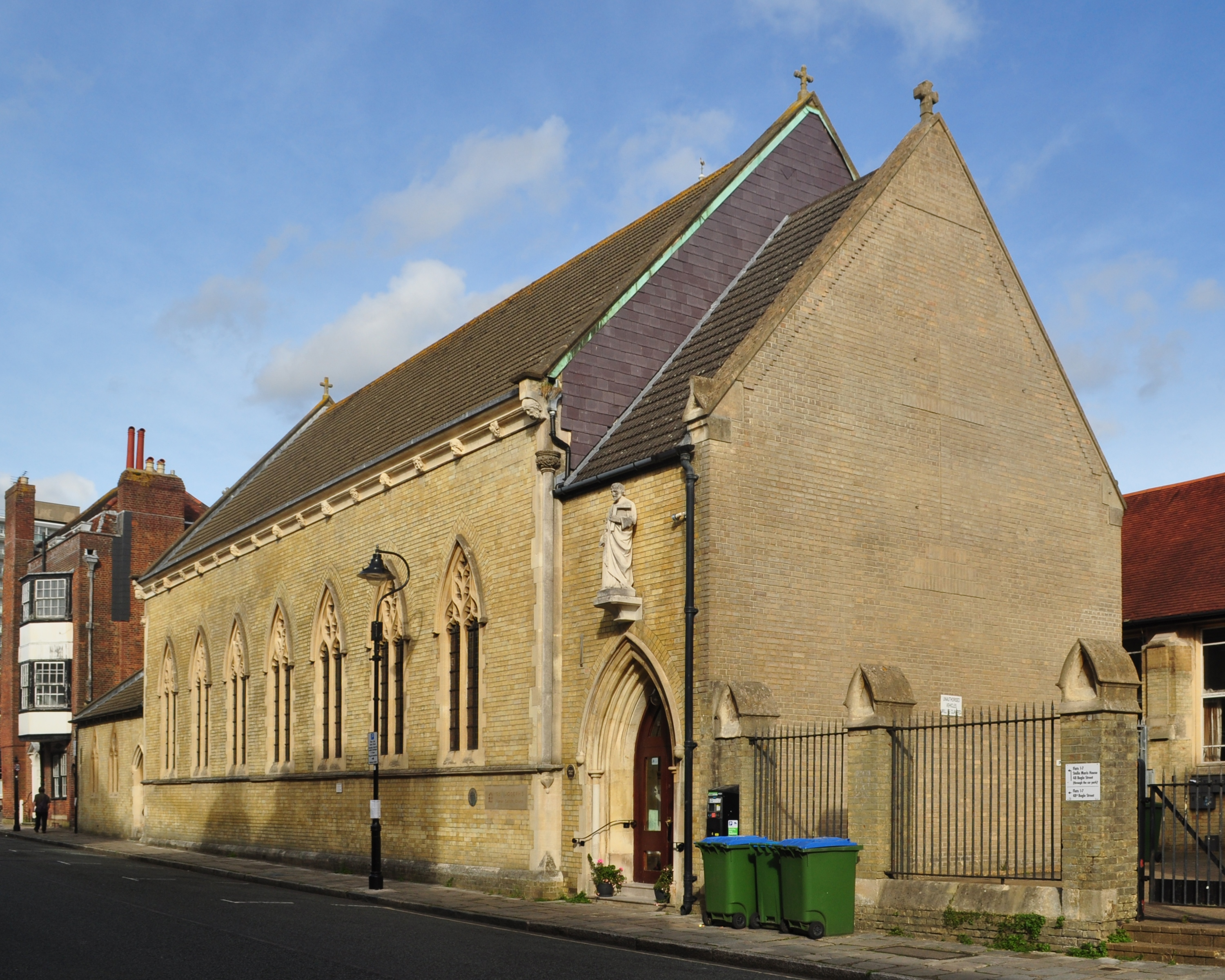
- Main entrance

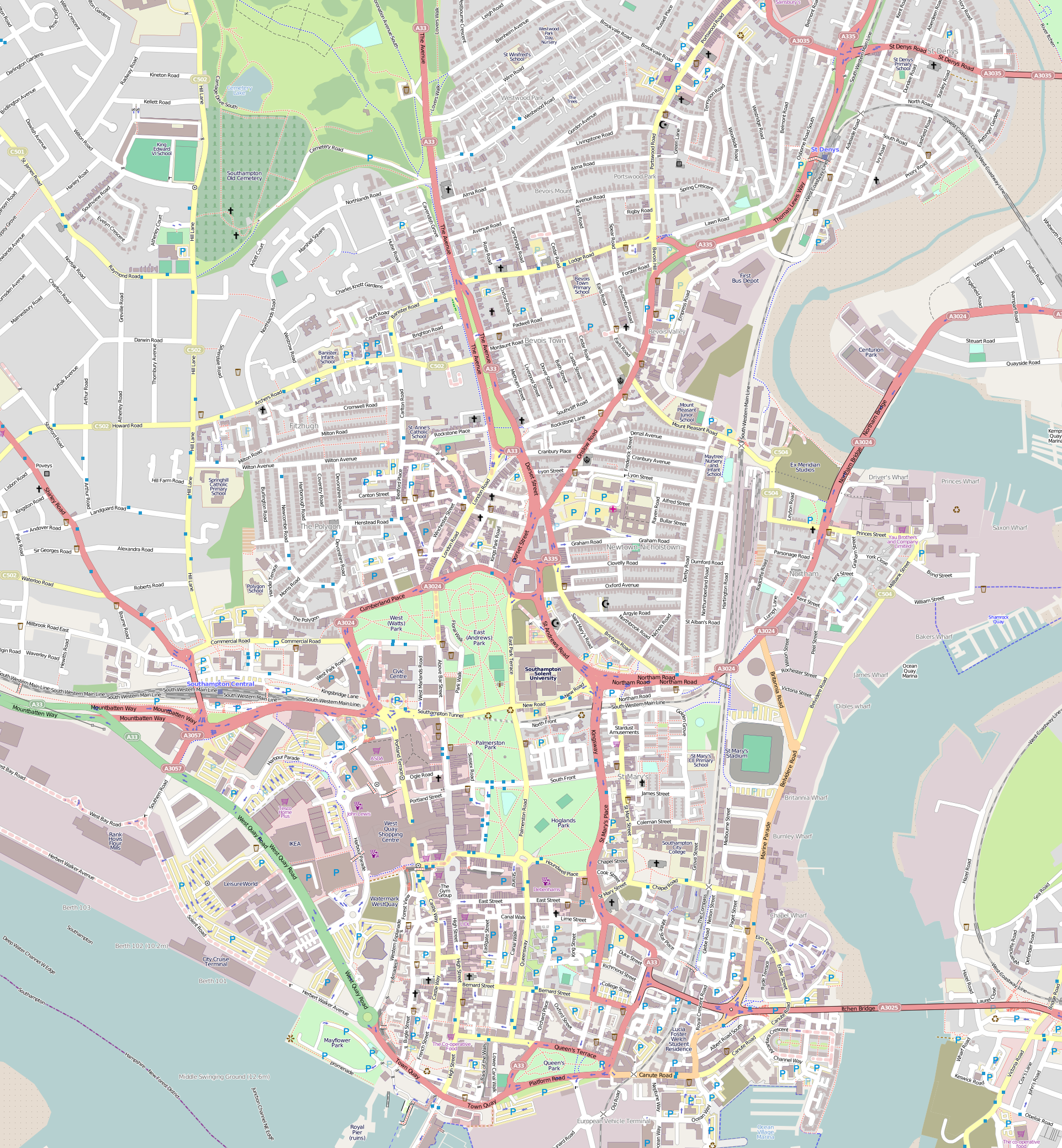
- Location in Southampton
- OS grid reference: SU 41886 11250
- Location: Southampton
- Country: England
- Denomination: Roman Catholic
- Website: Southampton-City-Catholics.org.uk

History
- Status: Active
- Founded: 1830
- Dedication: Saint Joseph

Architecture
- Functional status: Parish church
- Heritage designation: Grade II listed
- Designated: 14 February 1969
- Architect(s): Augustus Pugin, J. G. Poole and Leonard Stokes
- Style: Gothic Revival
- Groundbreaking: March 1843
- Completed: 1845

Administration
- Province: Southwark
- Diocese: Portsmouth
- Deanery: Southampton
- Parish: St Joseph and St Edmund

St Joseph's Church is a Roman Catholic parish church in Southampton, Hampshire. It is situated on Bugle Street, in the centre of the city, north of Town Quay. The church chancel was designed by Augustus Pugin and built in 1843. It was the first Catholic church founded in Southampton after the Reformation. It was the pro-cathedral of the Diocese of Portsmouth in 1882. It is a Grade II listed building.

== History ==
=== Foundation ===
In 1789, French Catholics fled to Southampton after the French Revolution. They worshipped in secret in a room in 13 St. Michael's Square in the city. In 1792, they opened a chapel in 67 High Street. In 1828, a presbytery was built. Two years later, St. Joseph's Church was built in the presbytery's garden.

=== Construction ===
In the early 1840s, a new St Joseph's Church had to be built to accommodate the growing congregation. In 1842, Augustus Pugin was asked to design the church. In March 1843, the foundation stone was laid. However, the parish could not afford Pugin's designs. Once the chancel was built, J. G. Poole, an architect and local surveyor, was asked to complete the church. The nave was built to his designs and in 1845, the new church was opened.

=== Pro-cathedral ===
On 19 May 1882, Pope Leo XIII established the Diocese of Portsmouth. As the Cathedral of St John the Evangelist in Portsmouth was under construction, St Joseph's church served as the pro-cathedral until 10 August, when the new cathedral in Portsmouth was opened.

=== Expansion ===
In 1888, Leonard Stokes was asked to renovate and expand the church. The north and south walls were rebuilt. A seventh window was added to the north side of the church. The height of the church was raised and the ceiling along the nave was replaced.

In 1911, the high altar, designed by Pugin was moved from the sanctuary to the Sacred Heart chapel in the church. In 1971, it was moved back and became the main altar. In 1981, a restoration of the church was undertaken.

== Parish ==
In 2006, the diocese reorganised its parishes. St Joseph's parish was merged with the neighbouring St Edmund's parish to form the Parish of St Joseph and St Edmund, which is sometimes referred to as the Southampton City Centre Parish.

Attached to the church is the Stella Maris Pastoral Centre. It is situated between St Joseph Church and the Anglican St. Michael's Church next door. It hosts parish events and meetings of local organisations.

St Joseph's Church has two Sunday Masses, one at 6:15pm on Saturday evening and the other at 10:00am on Sunday morning. St. Edmund's Church has four Sunday Masses. They are at 9:00am, 11:00am and 7:00pm on Sunday and there is a Mass in Polish at 7:00pm on Saturday evening.

== Exterior ==
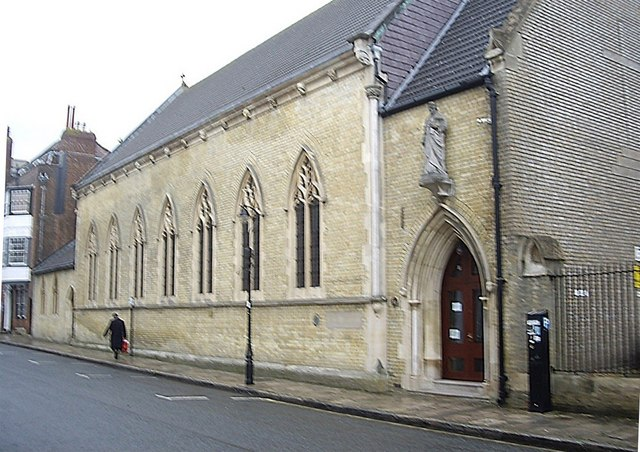
West side of the church

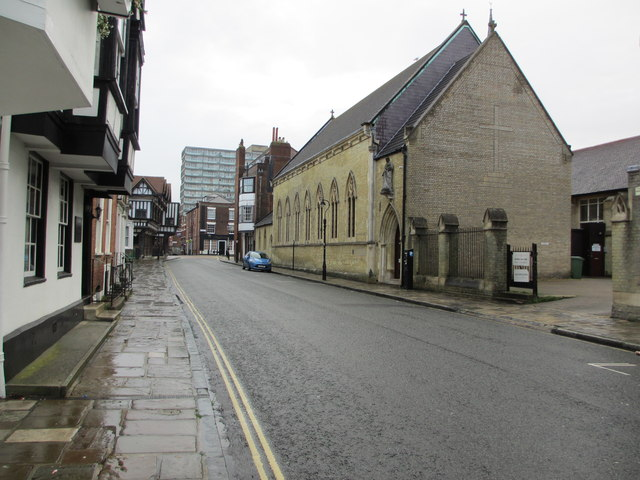
View along Bugle Street

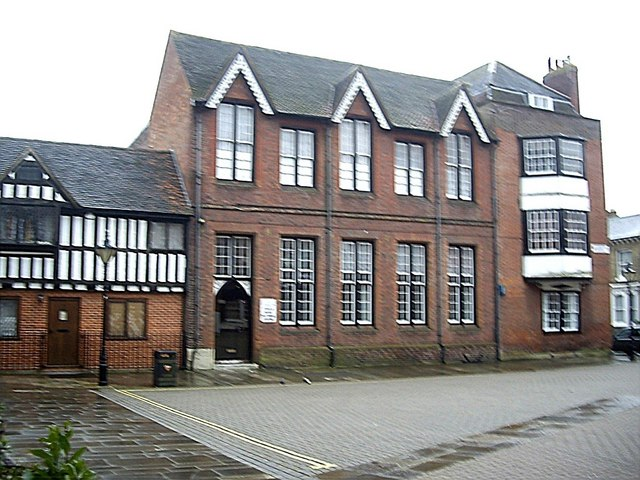
Stella Maris Pastoral Centre, attached to the church

== See also ==
- Diocese of Portsmouth
- St. Edmund Church, Southampton
