= St Edmund's Church, Southampton =

Coordinates: 50.9150°N 1.4031°W

St Edmund's Church
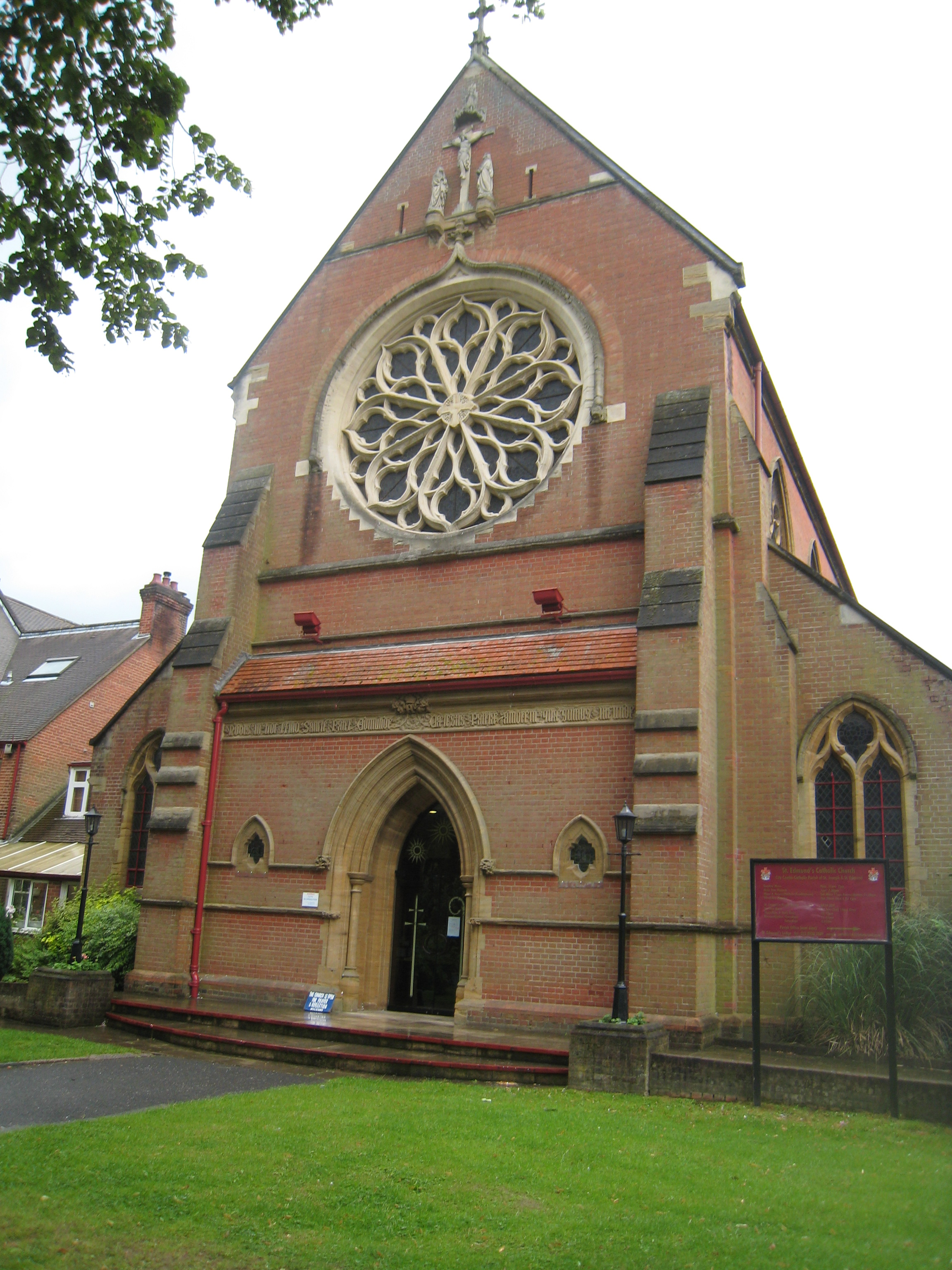
- Front entrance

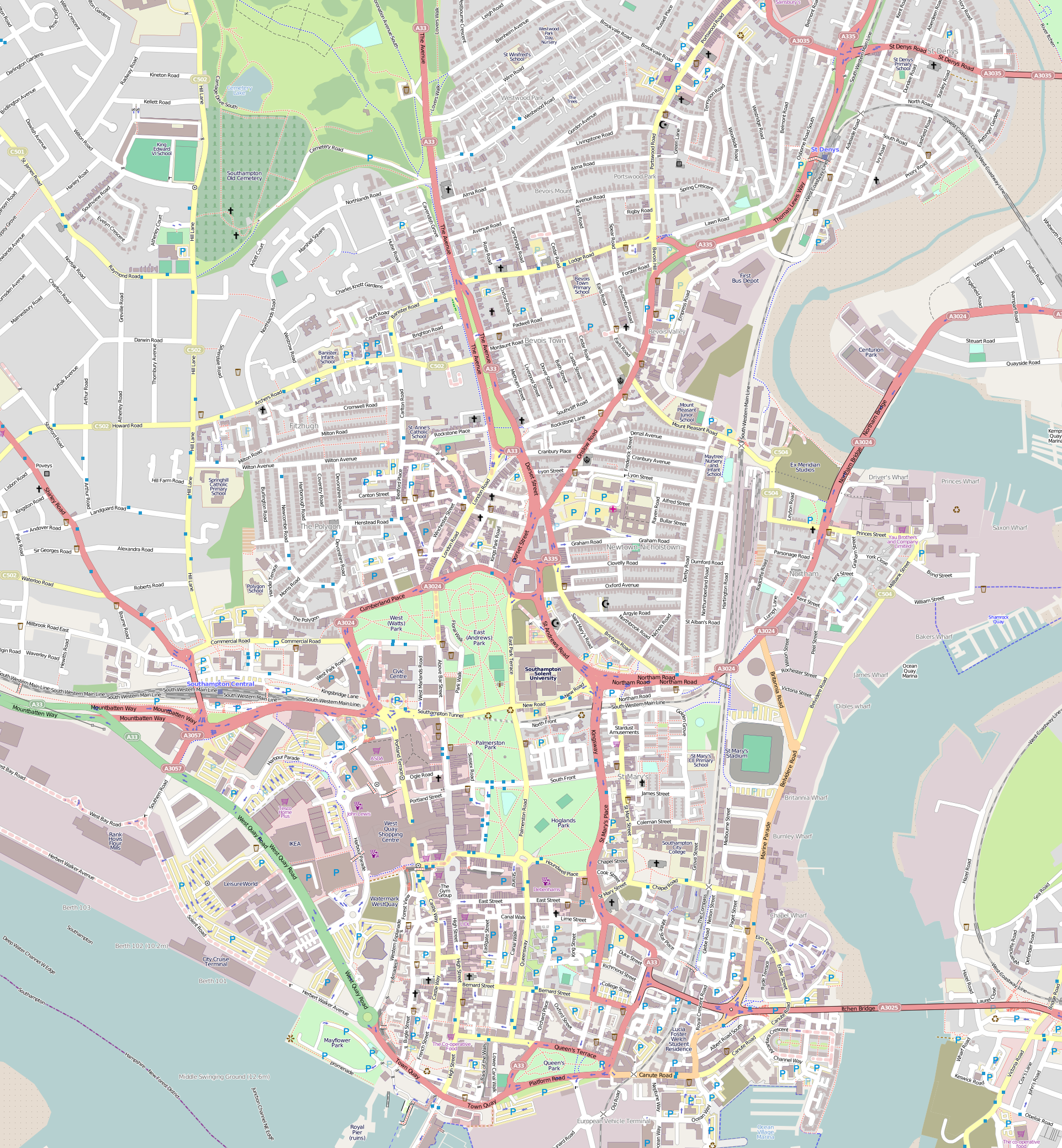
- Location in Southampton
- OS grid reference: SU 42056 13006
- Location: Southampton
- Country: England
- Denomination: Roman Catholic
- Website: southamptoncitycentrecatholics.org

History
- Status: Active
- Founded: 1884
- Dedication: Edmund of Abingdon

Architecture
- Functional status: Parish church
- Heritage designation: Grade II listed
- Designated: 30 March 1999
- Architect: J. William Lunn
- Style: Gothic revival
- Groundbreaking: 21 June 1888
- Completed: 20 November 1889

Administration
- Province: Southwark
- Diocese: Portsmouth
- Deanery: Southampton
- Parish: St Joseph and St Edmund

St Edmund's Church is a Roman Catholic parish church in Southampton, Hampshire. It is situated on the corner of The Avenue and Rockstone Place. It was built in 1889 and is a Grade II listed building.

== History ==
=== Foundation ===
The first Roman Catholic church that was built in Southampton after the Reformation was the Pugin designed St Joseph's Church. In 1867, the priest there decided that a new church was needed in Southampton to the serve the growing Catholic population in the city. In 1884, two years after the Diocese of Portsmouth was created, St Edmund's Church was built. It was temporary, made of iron and was named after Saint Edmund of Abingdon, co-patron of the diocese.

=== Construction ===
On 21 June 1888, construction began on a larger and permanent St Edmund's Church. The architect was J. William Lunn, who also designed Our Lady of the Annunciation Church, King's Lynn, Corpus Christi Church in Boscombe, Corpus Christi Church in Portsmouth and St Catherine's Church in Chipping Camden. It was opened on 20 November 1889, the birth date of Saint Edmund of Abingdon. Present at the church's opening was the Bishop of Portsmouth, John Vertue, and Canon Alexander Scoles, who was an architect himself.

=== Renovations and Restorations ===
In 1918, the sanctuary was redecorated. The walls were repainted and stained-glass windows by Lavers, Barraud and Westlake were made. Two paintings were added and communion rails by Hardman & Powell were installed. From 1967 to 1969, the church was renovated. A small spire or flèche at the west end of the church was removed. The porch inside the church was enlarged and a new organ, from St Mark's Church in Portsmouth, was installed.

In 1988, a fire broke out and severely damaged the building. By 1989, restoration of the church was complete and it was reopened.

On the Northern side of the church is a small building known as St Edmund's Lodge. The Presbytery is located in one of two large houses to the south of the Church; the other is used as Catholic student accommodation. Also to the south is a 1960s building which is used as the Church Hall.

== Parish ==
In 2006, the diocese reorganised its parishes. St Edmund's parish was merged with the neighbouring St Joseph's parish to form the Parish of St Joseph and St Edmund, which is sometimes referred to as the Southampton City Centre Parish.

St Edmund's Church has four Sunday Masses. They are at 9:00 am, 11:00 am and 7:00 pm on Sunday and there is a mass in Polish at 7:00 pm on Saturday evening. St Joseph Church has two Sunday Masses, one at 6:15 pm on Saturday evening and the other at 10:00 am on Sunday morning.

Close to St Edmund's is the all-girls St Anne's Catholic School.

The Parish of St Joseph's and St Edmund's hosts a Verbum Dei religious community, which provides chaplaincy to the University of Southampton and Southampton Solent University.

== Interior ==
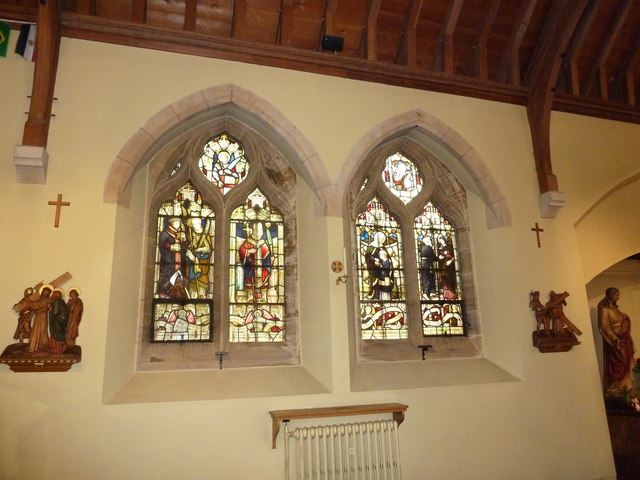
Stained-glass windows

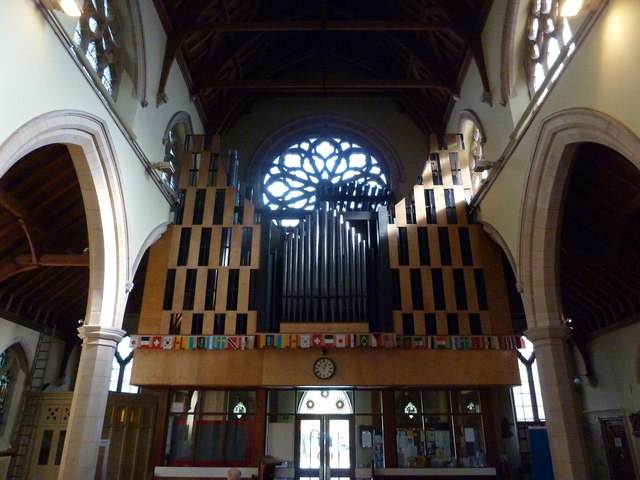
Church organ

== See also ==
- St Joseph's Church, Southampton
- St Anne's Catholic School, Southampton
- Roman Catholic Diocese of Portsmouth
