= Shirley, Southampton =

District of Southampton, England

Coordinates: 50.9218°N 1.4323°W

Shirley
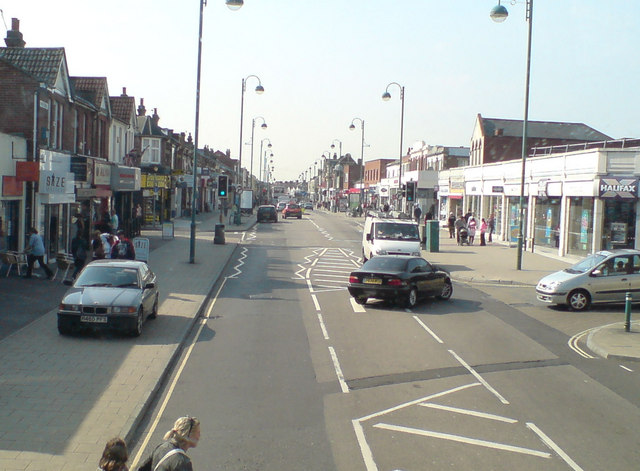
- Shirley High Street

- Location within Southampton
- Unitary authority: Southampton
- Ceremonial county: Hampshire
- Region: South East
- Country: England
- Sovereign state: United Kingdom
- Post town: SOUTHAMPTON
- Postcode district: SO15
- Dialling code: 023
- Police: Hampshire and Isle of Wight
- Fire: Hampshire and Isle of Wight
- Ambulance: South Central
- UK Parliament: Southampton Test

Shirley is a broad district and a former village on the western side of Southampton, in the ceremonial county of Hampshire, England. Shirley's main roles are retailing and residential. It is the most important suburban shopping area in the west of the city. Housing is a mixture of council houses in the centre of the district surrounded by private housing, with larger suburban houses concentrated in Upper Shirley. Shirley is separated from Highfield by Southampton Common, a large green public space.

== History ==
The Lower Palaeolithic is represented at Shirley, a small number of Acheulian hand-axes and associated implements have been found. Other finds include an adze head from the Neolithic.

The place-name Shirley commonly means "bright clearing", from the Old English very similarly pronounced scir (bright) and leah (cleared land in a wood). Shirley is recorded as a manor with a mill in the Domesday Book; the mill standing to the west of the present Romsey Road/Winchester Road junction, at the confluence of the Hollybrook and Tanner's Brook streams. Shirley Mill had three large ponds, to the north of Winchester Road. One of the three mill ponds remains today, accessed by following the Lordswood Greenway.

In 1228, Nicholas de Sirlie, lord of Shirley, surrendered rights to Southampton Common in return for a small payment and the agreement that the Burgesses of Southampton had no rights of common over the land that would later become Shirley Common. In the nineteenth century an iron works was built, which was converted into a brewery in 1880 and subsequently into a laundry at the beginning of the 20th century. The laundry was owned by Royal Mail and used to service the mail ships visiting Southampton.

The stream from the mill crossed over the Romsey Road until it was culverted under the major traffic junction which stands there, and continues to the Test to the east of modern Tebourba Way, open in parts and culverted in others. A second mill was built at what is now the junction of Oakley Road and Tebourba Way. This site was later a paint factory known as Atlantic Works and mill buildings survive in commercial use on both sides of Oakley road astride the old mill leat.

The district grew rapidly in the 1830s following the enclosure of Shirley Common. The Hampshire Chronicle announced in April 1830 that "Several elegant villas are about to be erected on Shirley Common". On the 28 November 1830 in the context of the Swing riots there was a non violent protest in Shirley and Millbrook by labourers demanding increased wages. The parish church was built in 1836. A council estate was built in the 1960s to replace relatively dense terraced housing.

Shirley was formerly a chapelry in the parish of Milbrook, on 31 December 1894 Shirley became a separate civil parish, on 31 March 1912 the parish was abolished to form Southampton. In 1911 the parish had a population of 33,161. It is now in the unparished area of Southampton.

=== Shirley and Freemantle Local Board of Health ===
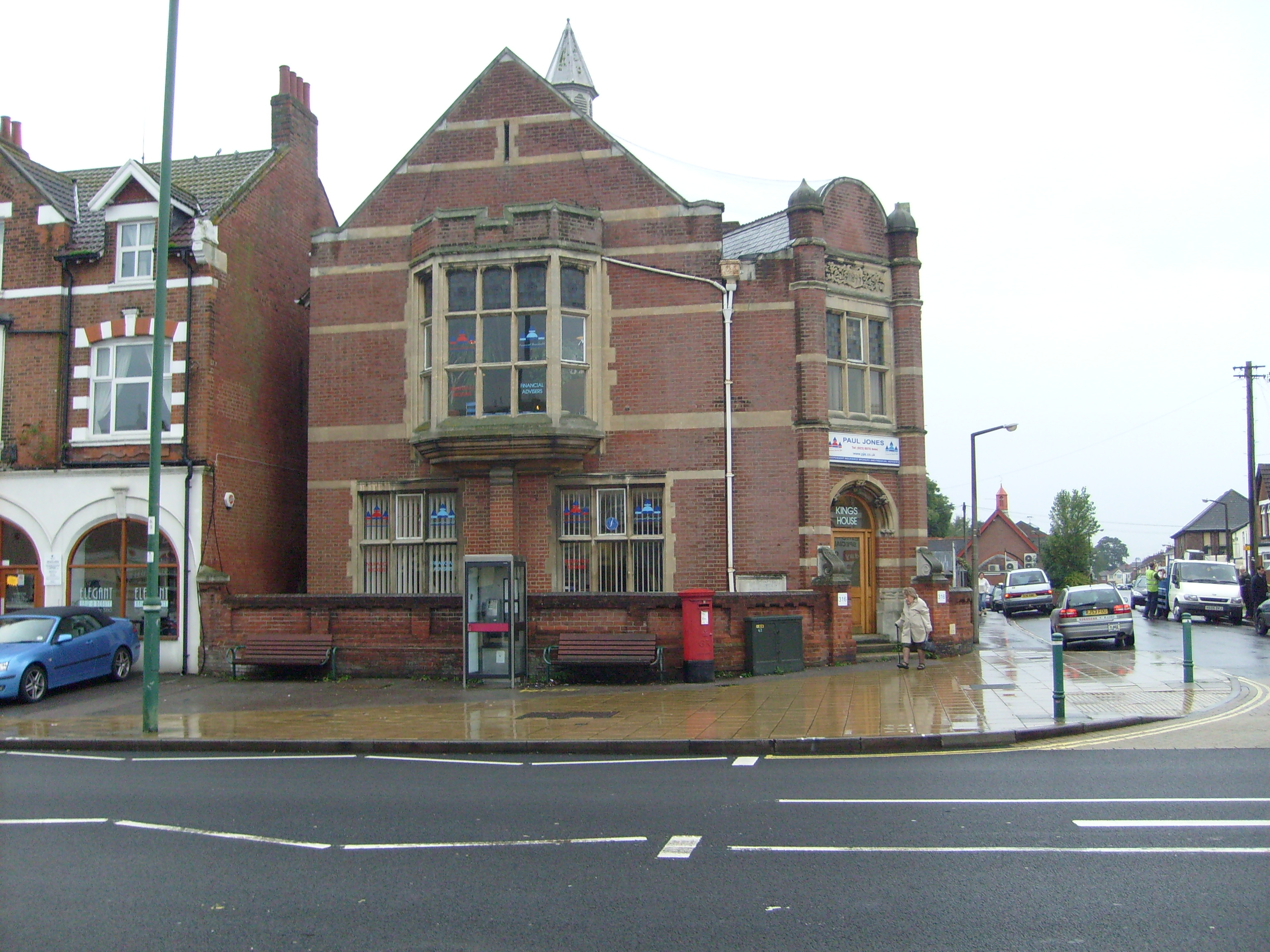
The 1894 council building

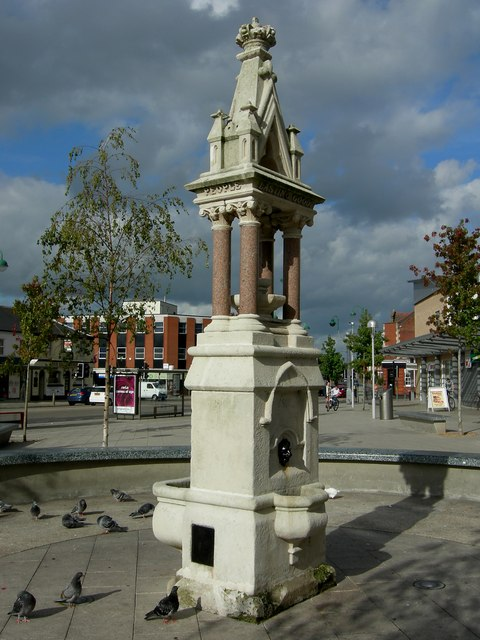
The drinking fountain in Shirley's shopping precinct

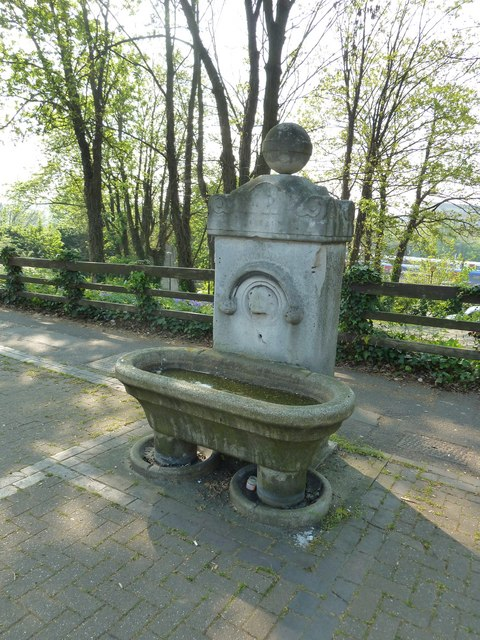
Fourposts Hill drinking trough in Freemantle

The ecclesiastical parish of Shirley was made a local board district on 21 February 1853. Freemantle was absorbed into the district on 29 September 1881 and the enlarged district was renamed "Shirley and Freemantle" a few weeks later, on 7 December 1881. Such local board districts were converted into urban districts on 31 December 1894. The Shirley and Freemantle Urban District was short-lived; it was abolished less than a year later on 8 November 1895 when the area was incorporated into the county borough of Southampton.

The board originally met in Church Street but moved to Ravenswood in July 1885. Ravenswood had previously been a house: the contents were auctioned off in 1870 following the bankruptcy of Mr. Gabriel Scott who was, however, still living there in 1876. It later became the headquarters of the Seventh-day Adventist Church in the British Isles. The Board meetings held at Ravenswood are reported in detail in the Hampshire Advertiser. Regular subjects for discussion included the state of the roads, especially surfacing by rolling gravel and the introduction of kerbstones; drainage and sewerage; street lighting; wells; slaughterhouses; and infectious diseases. One meeting in 1893 received statistics concerning scarletina, typhoid fever, diphtheria, erysipelas, and smallpox. Smallpox was a particular issue. At another 1893 meeting, concern was expressed about Southampton's smallpox hospital ship, City of Adelaide, being anchored off Freemantle where children played on the beach. The Board received reports from the South Stoneham Poor Law Union because that Union's responsibilities included "the parish of Millbrook" which "includes the hamlets of Hill, and Sidford, the tything of Millbrook, and the village of Shirley."

In 1887 the board constructed a drinking fountain to celebrate the Golden Jubilee of Queen Victoria. Originally in Shirley High Street, the fountain has now been incorporated into the shopping precinct. The fountain is Grade II listed. Another was constructed at Fourposts.

By 1892, Shirley and Freemantle Local Board of Health were considering building new offices on the Brooklyn estate, which the 1860s Ordnance Survey map shows to be consistent with the extant building's location. Plans were submitted in 1892 and a Public inquiry was held in January 1893. The building has a foundation stone laid by W. A. Killby Esq., chairman of the Shirley and Freemantle Local Board, 12 June 1893. The stone also mentions that H. J. West was the architect and F. Osman was the contractor. Speeches at the laying ceremony were used to attempt to justify the expense of the building, criticise Southampton for polluting the Itchen, and express resistance to Southampton ever annexing Shirley. The report in the Hampshire Advertiser also describes the building which would include an upstairs boardroom 30 ft long by 25 ft wide, and downstairs offices for the clerk, surveyor, inspector of nuisances, and the collector (of revenues). A dinner to celebrate the opening of the new building was held on 12 January 1894. After the move, Ravenswood appears to have been used again by the Seventh-day Adventist church.

The Local Board became the Urban District Council in 1895 with the same membership. It dealt with similar issues, for example the 27 November meeting included a report about "how Shirley and Freemantle are drained" but actually about problems with the system. It was to become preoccupied with the question of "Annexation" by Southampton which had recently been raised in some detail at a special meeting of the former Local Board on 28 November 1894. The Hampshire Advertiser report of the first UDC meeting, held on 2 January 1895, ended with "The 'Annexation' Scheme: At a special meeting of the Board, held on Saturday, it was resolved that one or two counsel be retained to represent the district at the forthcoming inquiry relative to the extension of the Southampton Borough boundaries." There was much concern about the impact of annexation on the rates, particularly given the incomplete state of mains water and drainage, but it was announced at 6 July meeting that these had been resolved. Subsequent UDC meetings were no less sceptical and the Hampshire Advertiser reports continue to use the word "annexation" throughout.

As abolition approached, the 16 October 1895 meeting started late and was brief. The subsequent meeting reported on 26 October was even briefer and concludes with "This was all the business".

=== Transport ===
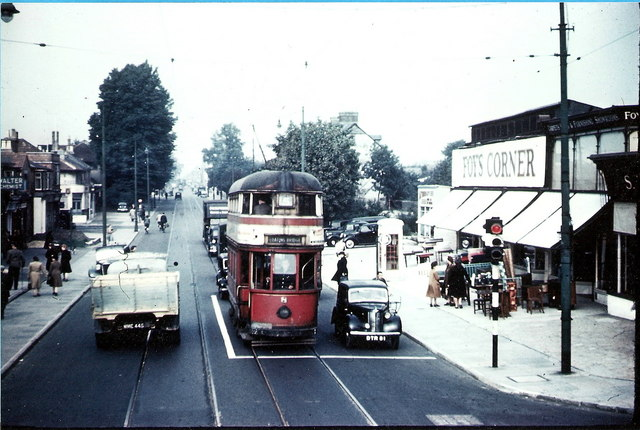
Tram from Shirley in Freemantle

In the late 1800s the Didcot, Newbury and Southampton Railway planned to build a railway through Shirley, to a new station near Southampton's Royal Pier. In the event the line was only built as far as Winchester Chesil Station. Deposited plans showed the line continuing South via Twyford, Chandlers Ford, Chilworth, Lordswood, the East side of Dale Valley, under Winchester Road, through land now occupied by Shirley Junior School and on to the East side of Hill Lane near Archers Road where there is a surviving (but never used) embankment to the North of Commercial Road. A story grew up that St James' Park, Southampton, in Shirley was to have been a local railway station on this route, but plans deposited with Hampshire Record Office for this scheme show this not to have been the case, with the intended route of the railway passing to the North East. Although some land was purchased and work undertaken, the large depression in which St James Park sits was in fact caused by later gravel extraction.

Archival research by the Shirley Local History Group, notably among the records of a local landowner, revealed that a later revival of this scheme, the Southampton and Winchester Great Western Junction Railway, did intend to use the park as the original route at this location had by then been developed. Plans and sections dated 1901 show the intended route of the railway as passing through the park from East to West. Records indicated that property sales were discussed for this scheme, which would have followed a slightly different route to the previous scheme in some areas without a tunnel at Chilworth. South of St James's Park at this time Didcot, Newbury and Station (now Stratton) Roads were named. Station Road also contained a police station. Nothing ultimately came of any of the railway schemes in this area, which finally petered out prior to World War One.

From 1879, a route of Southampton Corporation Tramways operated from Southampton via Fourposts Hill along Shirley High Street. Substantial further development was proposed in 1899. It ran until 1949 as far as what is now the current Shirley Precinct. This stop is still known as "Shirley Terminus" to some residents when using bus services. A large Tram depot was located in Carlisle Road, later being used as a bus depot until demolition in the 1980s.

== Retail ==
Shirley high street is a major shopping district. In September 2025, BBC News reported of a campaign of teenage violence against local businesses.

== Education ==
Shirley is home to several schools including Upper Shirley High School (formerly Bellemoor Boys School), Richard Taunton Sixth Form College (the Hill Lane site was formerly the Girls' Grammar) and the 450-year-old King Edward VI School. The area is also served by Regents Park Community College (formerly Regents park Girls School). The Atherley School, founded in 1924, was in Hill Lane from 1926 to 1997.

Shirley has several infant and junior schools.

== Pubs ==
Current and former public houses

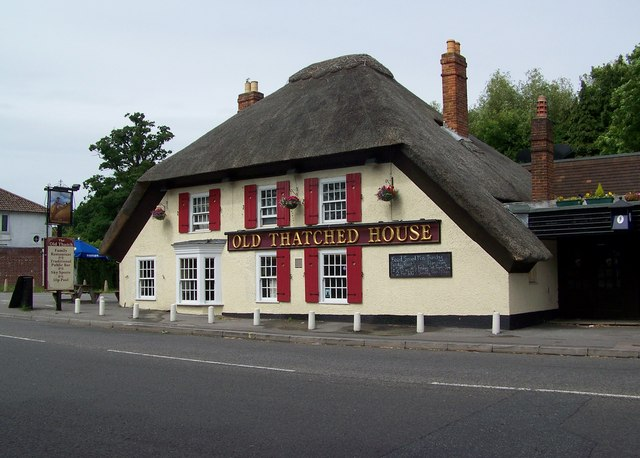
The Old Thatched House in Old Shirley

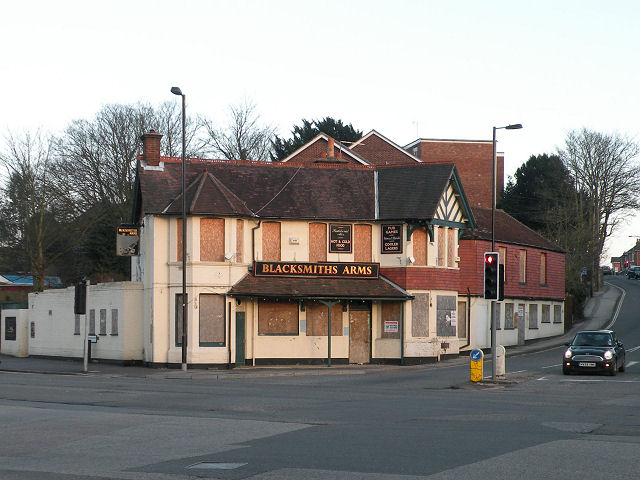
The Blacksmith's Arms, Old Shirley

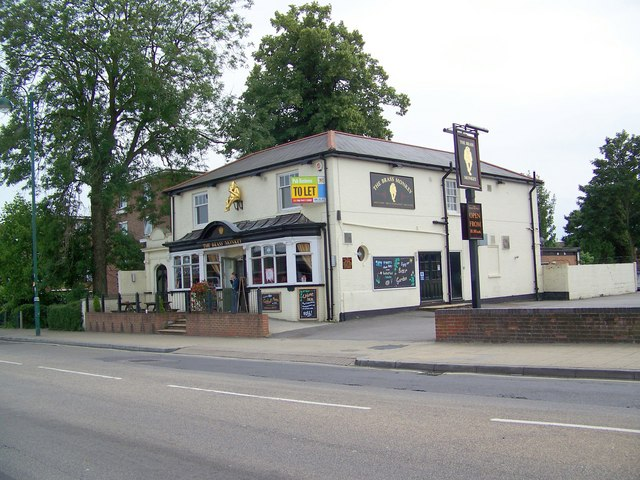
The Brass Monkey, formerly the Rising Sun

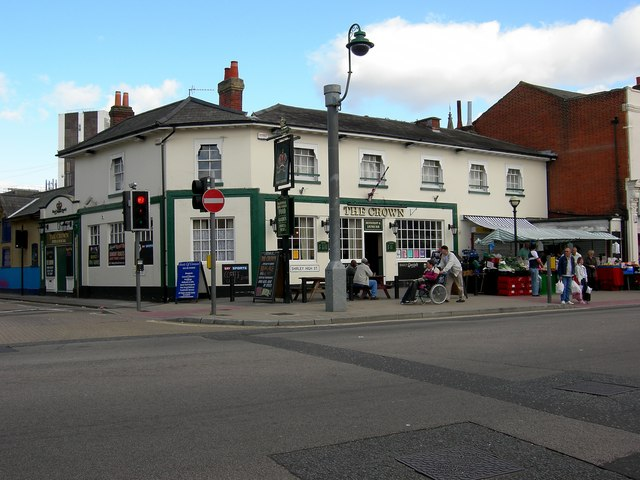
The Crown, Shirley High Street

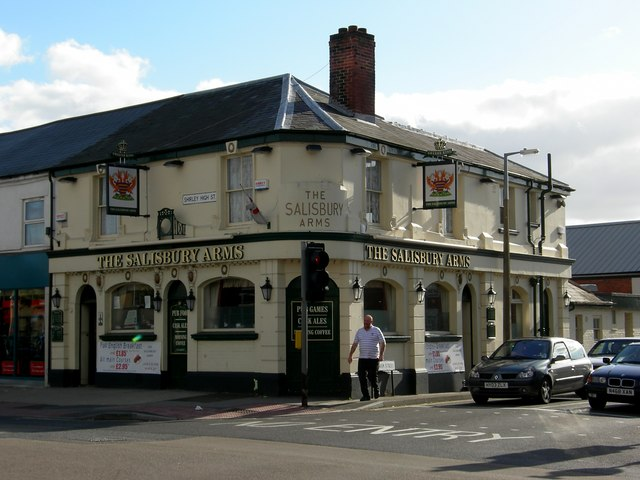
The Salisbury Arms

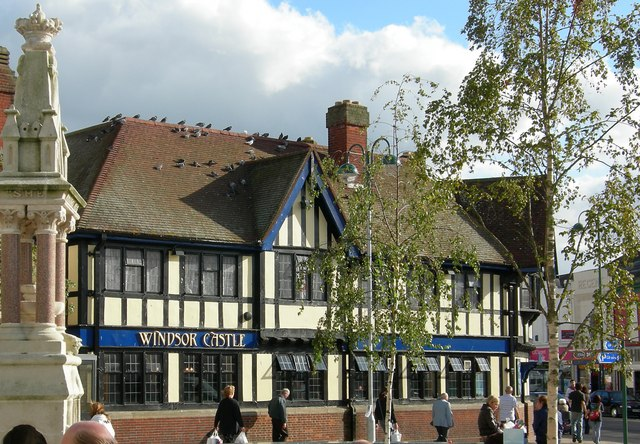
The Windsor Castle, Shirley High St

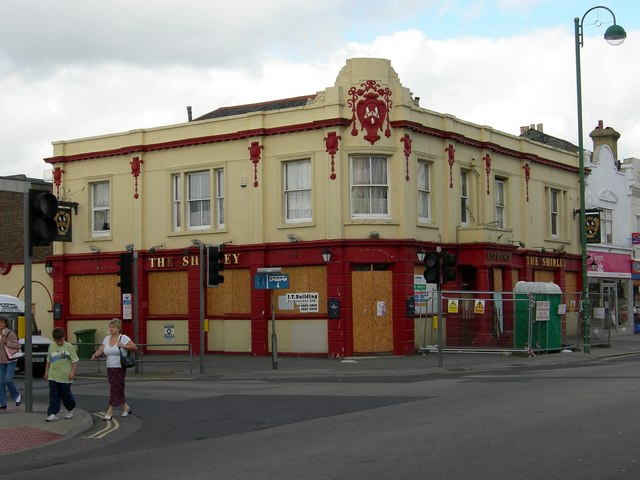
The Shirley

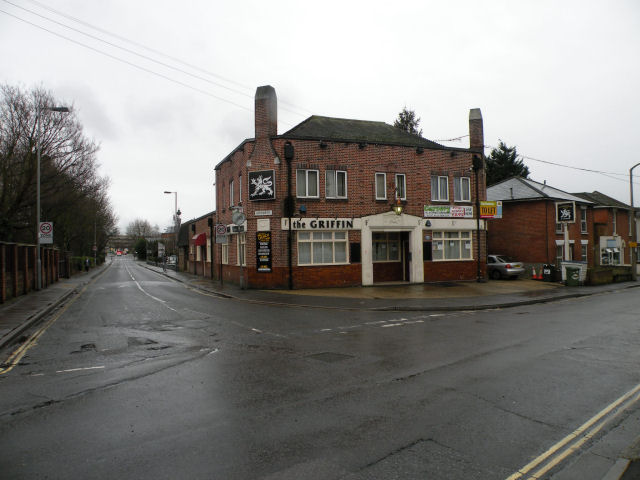
The Griffin, Anglesea Road

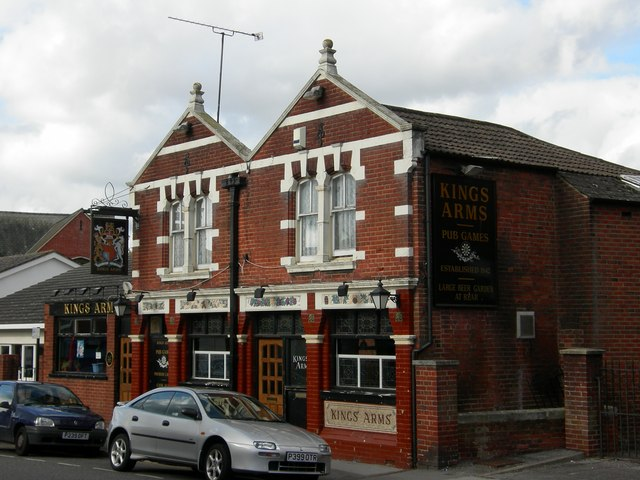
The King's Arms, Church Street

== Cinemas ==
Former cinemas
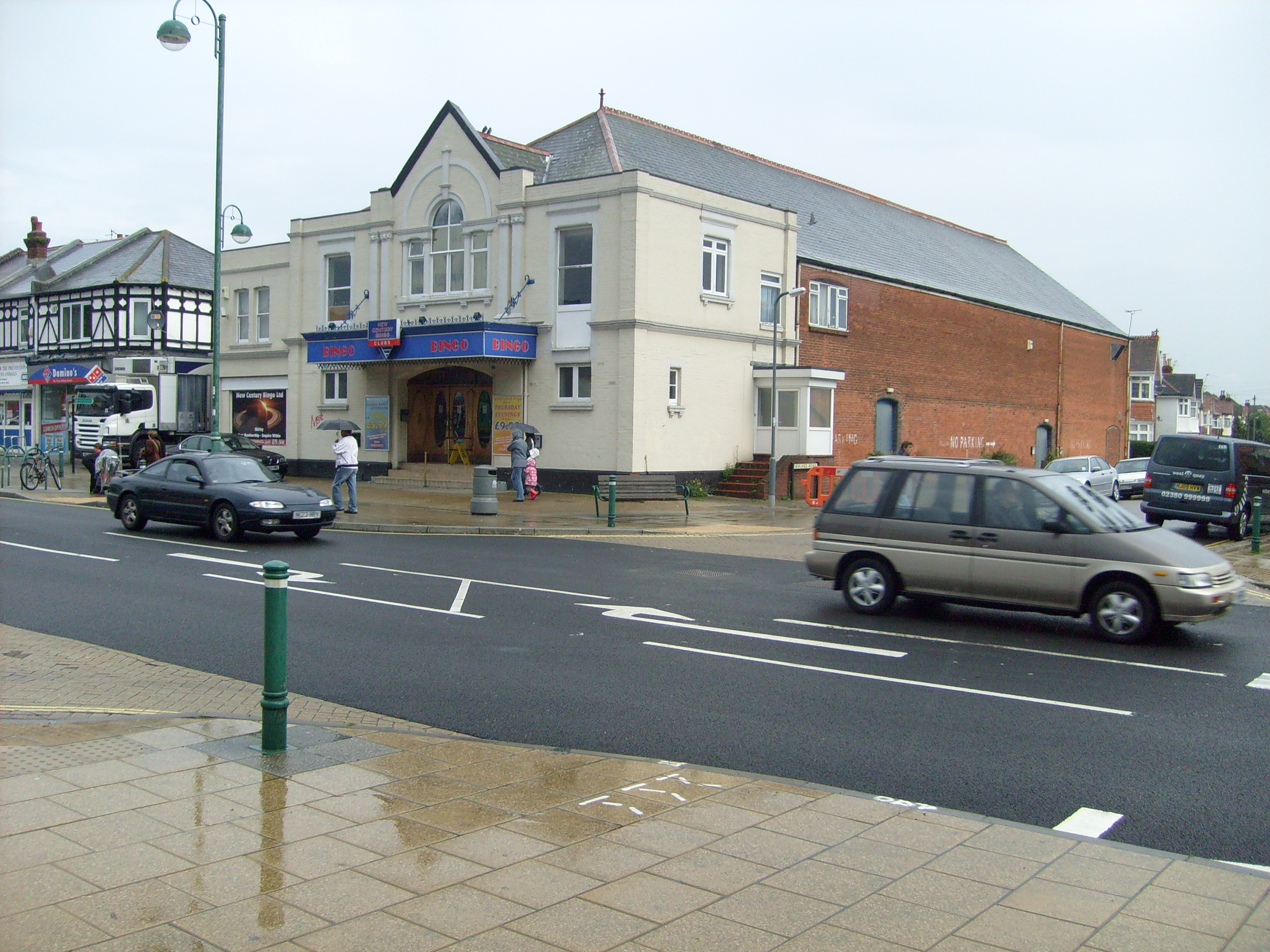
Atherley

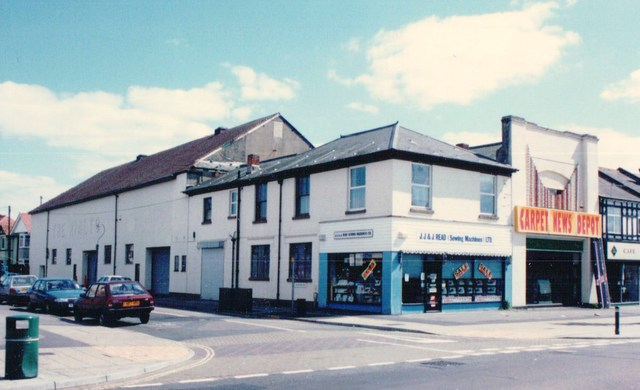
Rialto, near the Atherley

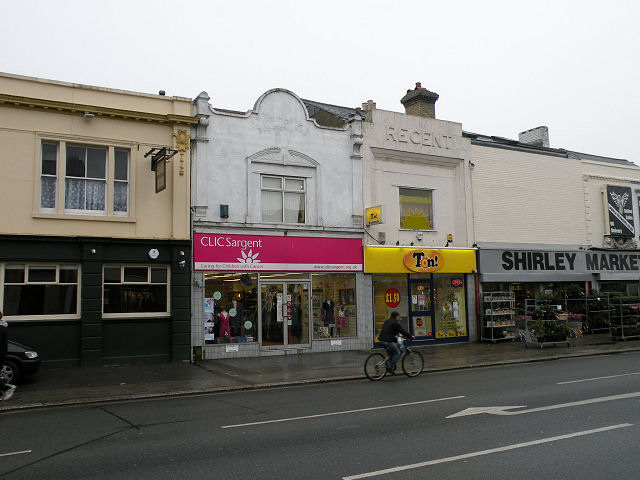
Regent, Shirley High Street

== Cemeteries ==
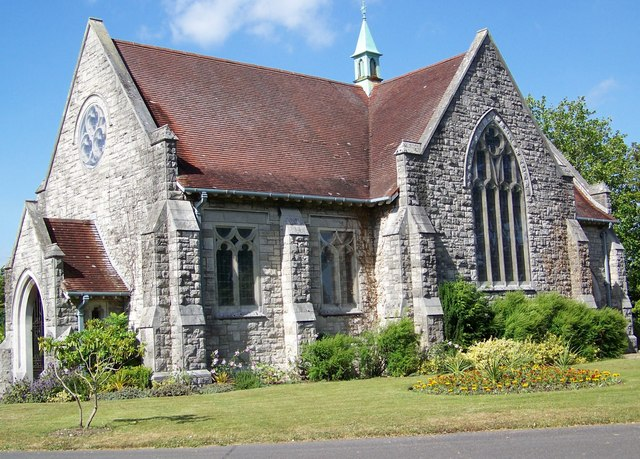
Chapel, Hollybrook Cemetery

Southampton Old Cemetery is on the Shirley side of Southampton Common in Hill Lane. It was set out following an Act of Parliament passed in 1843.

Hollybrook Cemetery is notable for being the resting place of several famous individuals, including the 1966 World Cup winning footballer Alan Ball (1945–2007), the comedian Benny Hill (1924–1992) and the RMS Titanic lookout Frederick Fleet. It also contains the Commonwealth War Graves Commission's (CWGC) Hollybrook Memorial to 1,883 Commonwealth land and air force personnel who were lost at sea in World War I and have no known grave; those listed include Field Marshal Earl Kitchener and those of his military entourage who were lost on HMS Hampshire in 1916, and most of the South African Native Labour Corps personnel who were lost in the sinking of SS Mendi in 1917.

The CWGC also maintain and register graves within the cemetery of 113 Commonwealth service personnel of World War I, most of them in a war graves plot before the Memorial, and 186 from World War II, including three unidentified Merchant Navy seamen, besides 67 non-Commonwealth war graves, mostly German (two of them unidentified). It also contains the grave of Frederick Fleet, lookout of the RMS Titanic on the night of its loss in 1912. Fleet was buried in a pauper's grave which went unmarked until 1993, when a headstone bearing an engraving of the Titanic was erected through donations by the Titanic Historical Society.

== Public art ==
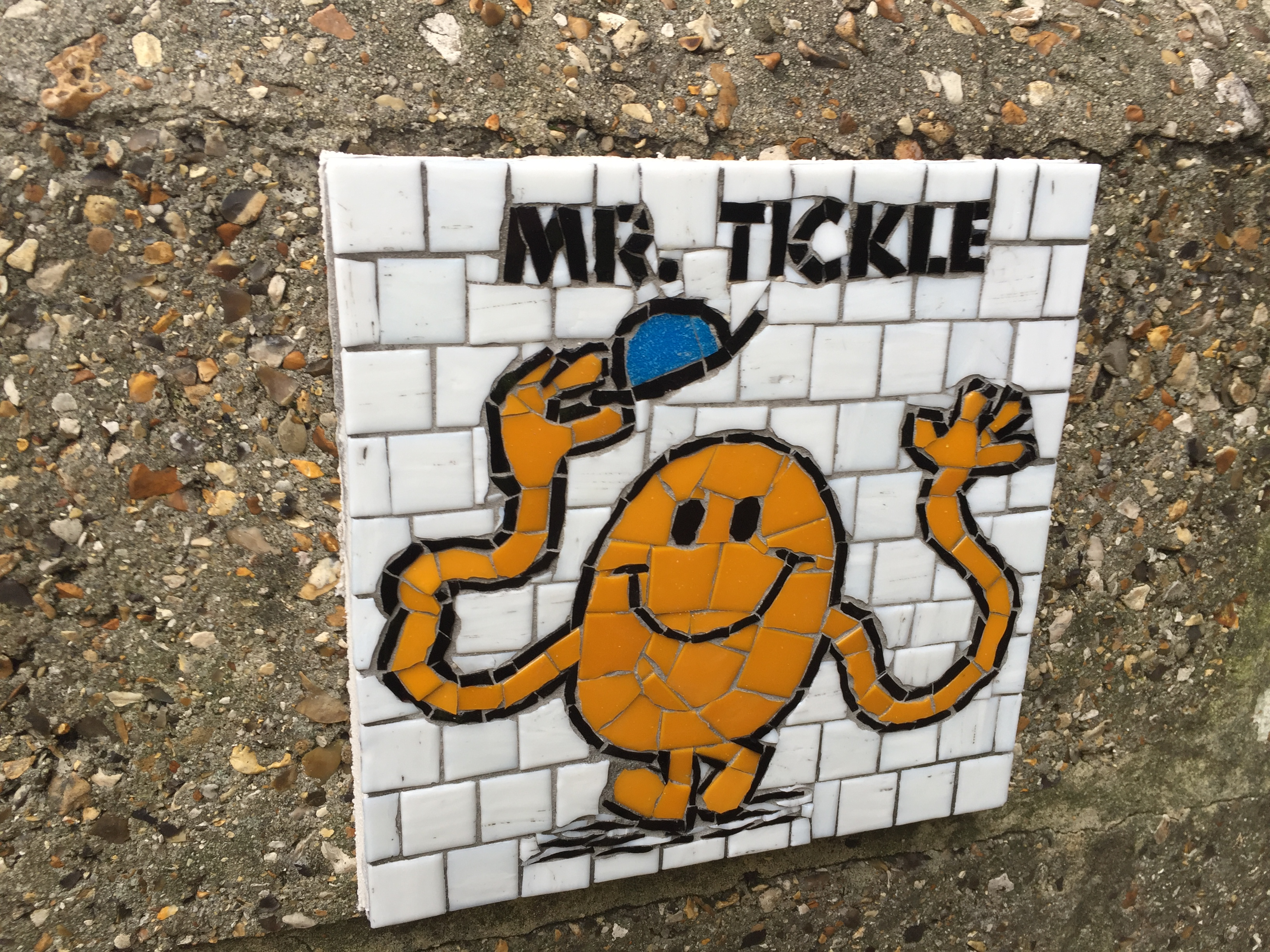
The Mr. Tickle mosaic on Romsey Road in Shirley

Like many districts in Southampton, Shirley has a number of public art installations. For example, a number of small fan-art mosaics have been created by mosaic street artist Will Rosie. The mosaics depict the well-known Mr. Men and Little Miss characters that were created by Roger Hargreaves. An online map, showing the locations of the mosaics, has been created.

== Political representation ==
Shirley is represented in the House of Commons, by the MP for Southampton Test, as of 2024, Ms Satvir Kaur MP (Labour). Kaur is a former councillor for Shirley ward and the former leader of the local authority.

The Shirley ward of Southampton City Council elects three councillors. As of 2025, there are two Labour councillors, including the current Leader of the Council, Cllr Alexander Winning, and one Liberal Democrat.

== See also ==
- Shirley Parish Church
- Shirley Baptist Church
