= Presbyterian Church, Aldershot =

Church building in Aldershot, Hampshire, England

Coordinates: 51.2481°N 0.7611°W

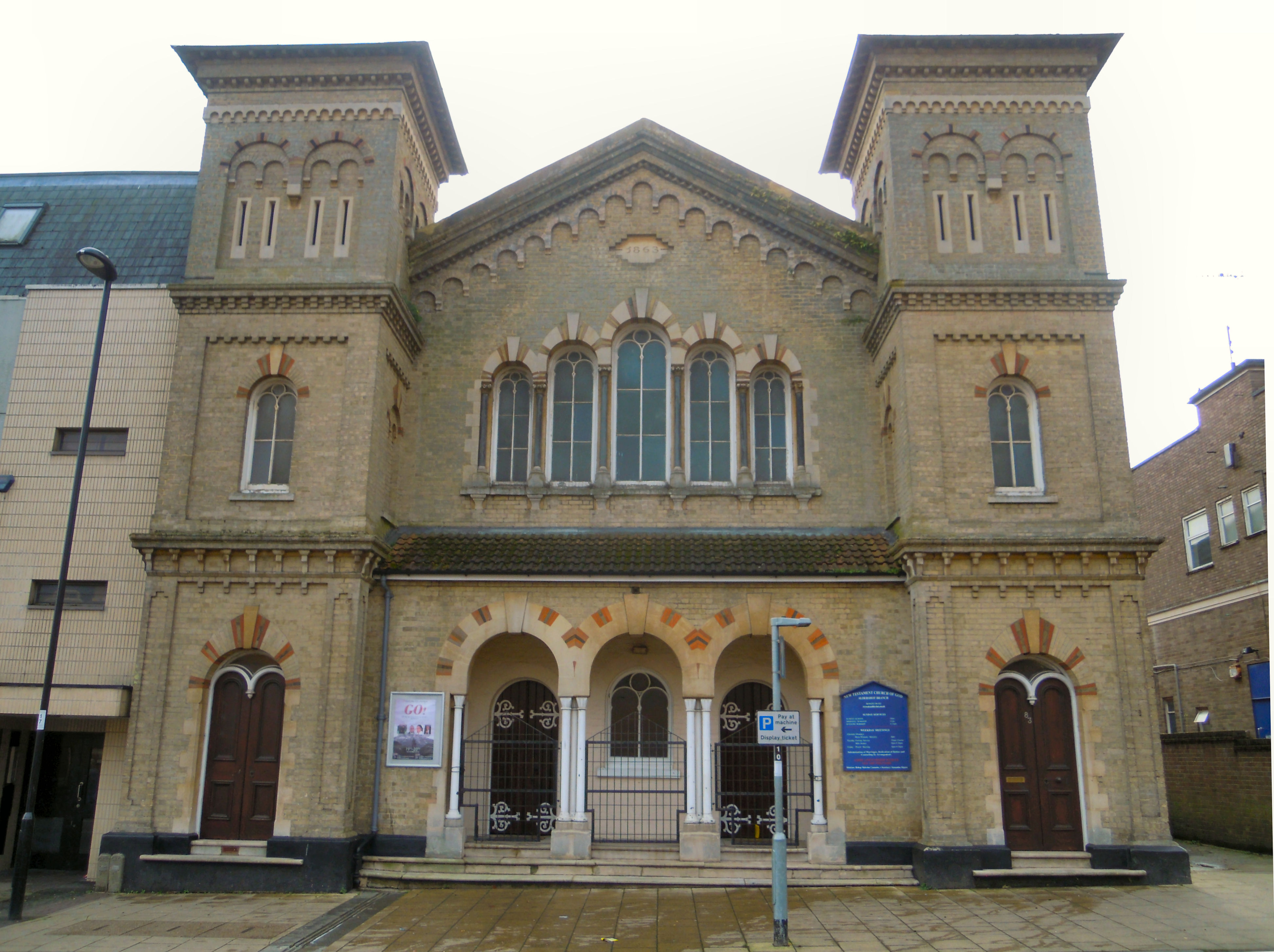
The former English Presbyterian church in Aldershot in Hampshire in 2016

The English Presbyterian Church is the former Presbyterian church for Aldershot in Hampshire. Built in 1863 it served that denomination until 1972 when most churches in the Congregational Church in England and Wales and virtually all of the congregations of the Presbyterian Church of England including that at Aldershot combined to form the United Reformed Church in England. By the late 1970s the building was derelict at which time it was purchased by the New Testament Church of God (NTCOG) who worship there today.

== History ==
The Presbyterian Church on open ground c1870

Located in the centre of Victoria Road in Aldershot in Hampshire and designed in the Italianate Style with twin towers to the front, the church is one of the oldest in the town centre having been founded in 1862 and built by 1863 at a total cost of £5,000. The initiative for building the church came from William Reavell, a local citizen who had been Chairman of the Local Board, who called a public meeting in October 1861 to discuss a proposal for a Presbyterian Church in Aldershot. The land in Victoria Road was purchased in September 1862 for £210, and in the following year, the building company of John Martin won the tender to build the church for £1,835 to the design of architect G. B. Musselwhite. The gallery was added in 1872. A Manse was added to the west side of the church, on the corner of Station Road, but this was demolished around 1950 and commercial buildings now occupy the site.

Built as the civilian town centre was beginning to grow, the building once sat on an extensive plot that stretched to the present Station Road on one side and a dirt track to the front which had recently been named 'Victoria Road'. Attached to the rear of the building were a Sunday school and meeting hall while the Manse (since demolished) later had its use changed to a Gospel Hall. So now was the church that it sat in the centre of open fields which eventually were developed with buildings. The entrance was originally via two small gates built into a wall on Victoria Road, but this has since been demolished.

The English Presbyterian church in Aldershot belonged to the Presbytery of London South. The galleried church can seat 700 in its original wooden pews. During World War I the church provided services for soldiers from the Camp including facilities for letter writing, tea and entertainment.

== Latter years ==
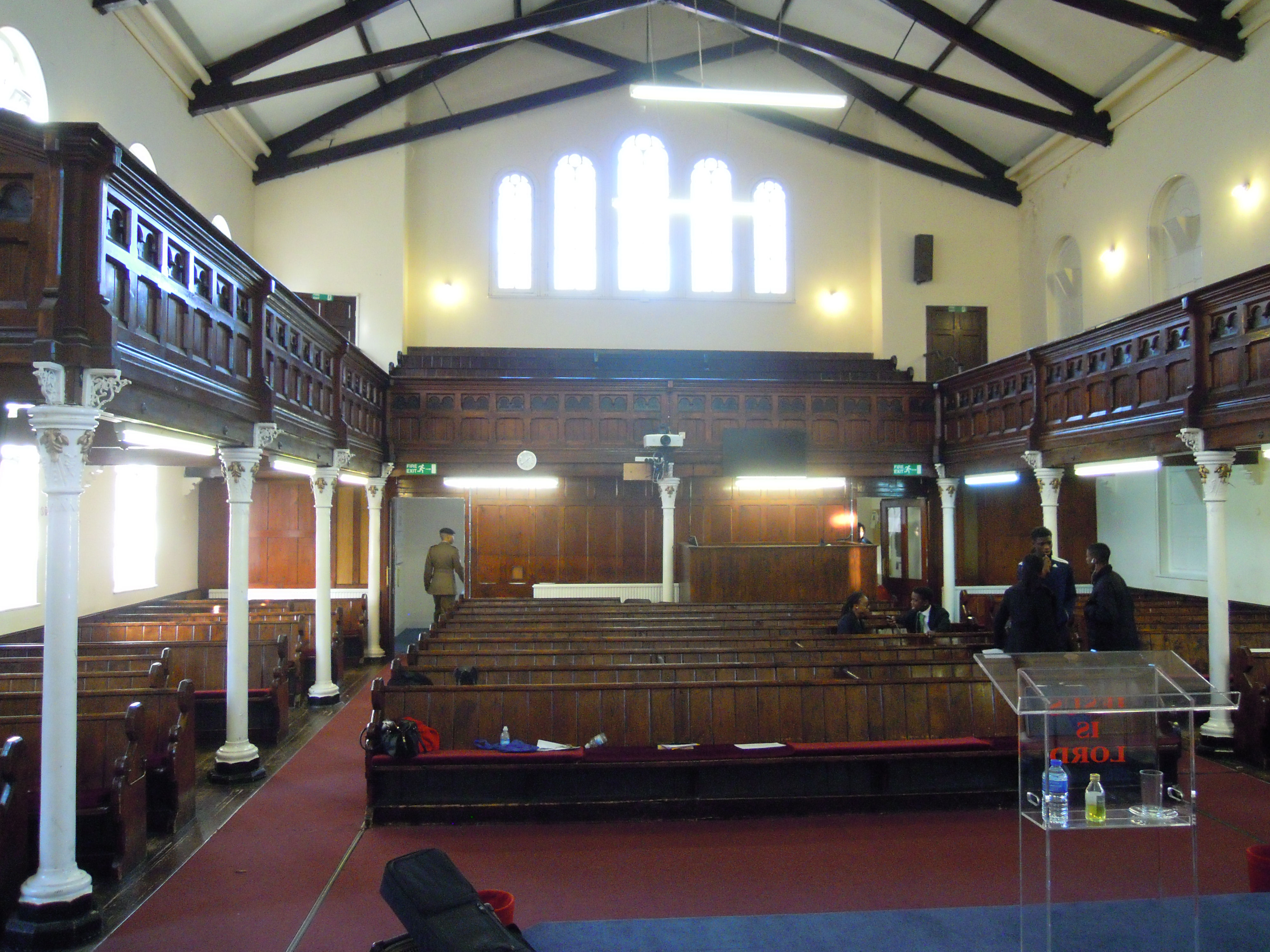
The interior of the church in 2016

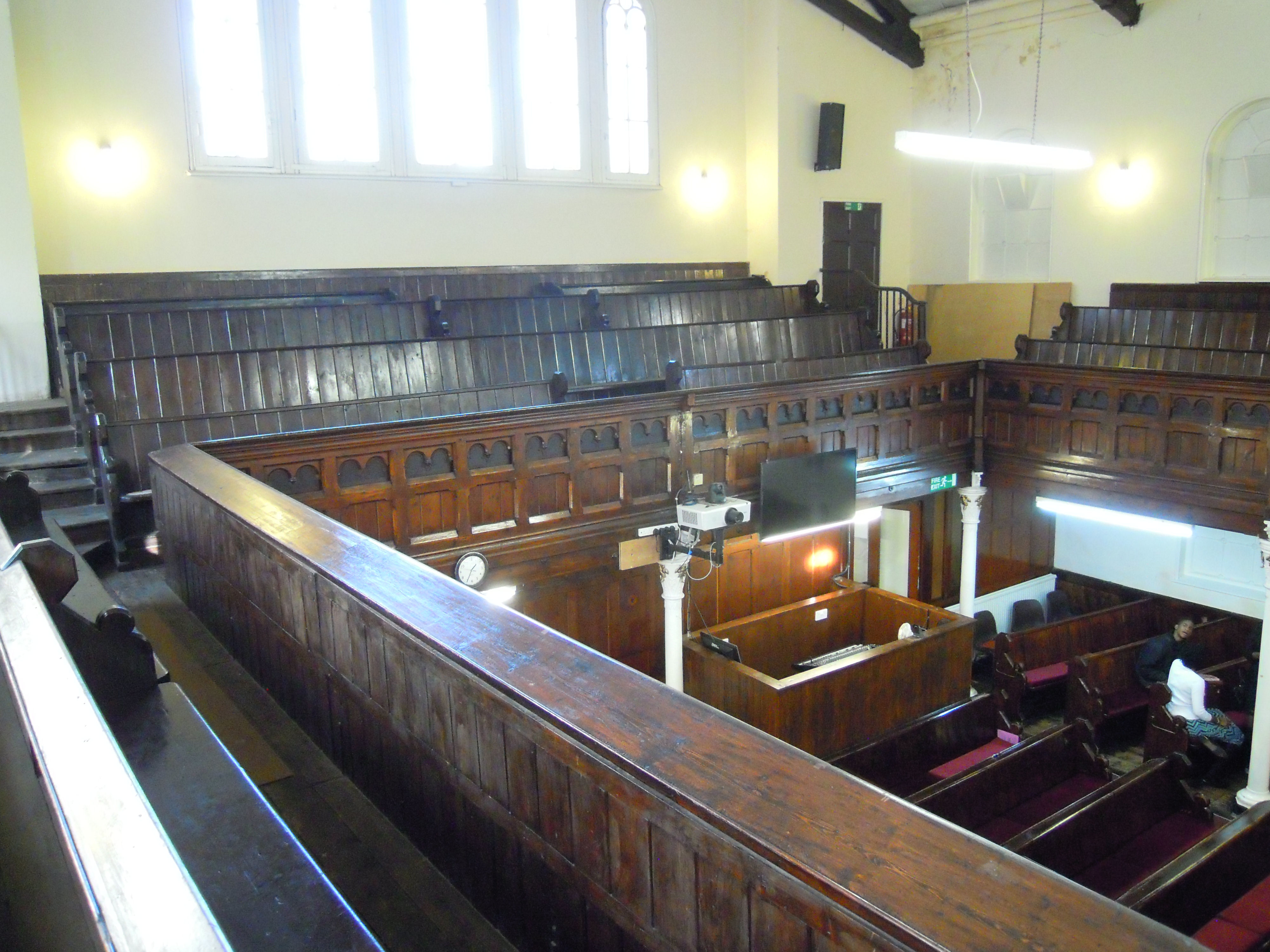
The gallery in 2016

In 1972 the majority of churches in the Congregational Church in England and Wales and virtually all of the congregations of the Presbyterian Church of England including that at Aldershot combined to form the United Reformed Church in England. By the 1970s the building was derelict at which time it was purchased by the local congregation of the New Testament Church of God who have worshipped there ever since with a thriving congregation.

Two memorials from World War I that were originally in the church can now be found on the porch of St Andrew's Garrison Church in Aldershot.
