= Shirley Parish Church =

Church in Southampton, UK

Coordinates: 50.92669°N 1.42825°W

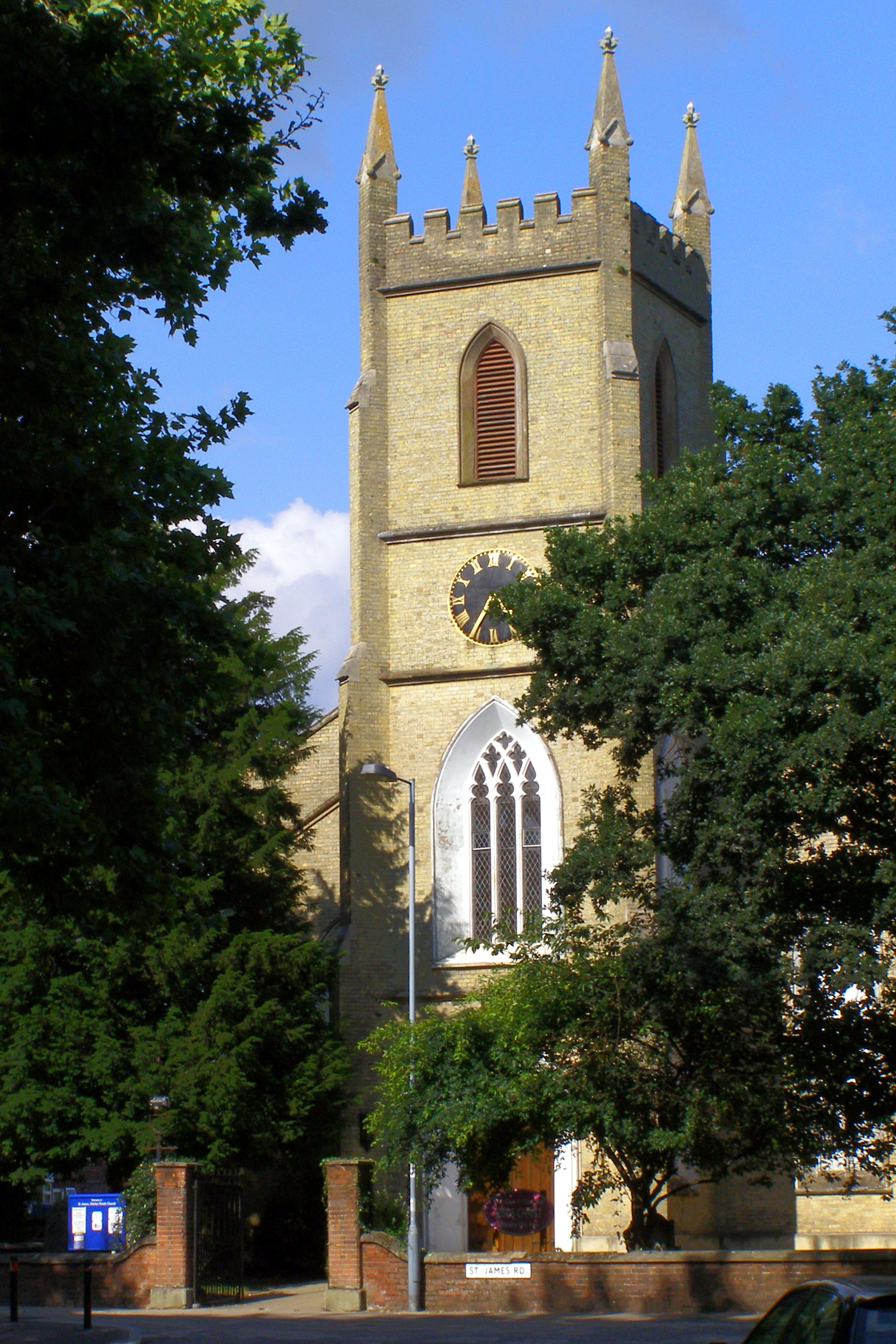
St James' church from Church Street

St James' by the Park (sometimes known as Shirley Parish Church) is an Anglican parish church which meets in Shirley, Southampton, England. Following the closure of St John's Church, the parish has one church building, the grade II listed St James'.

== History ==
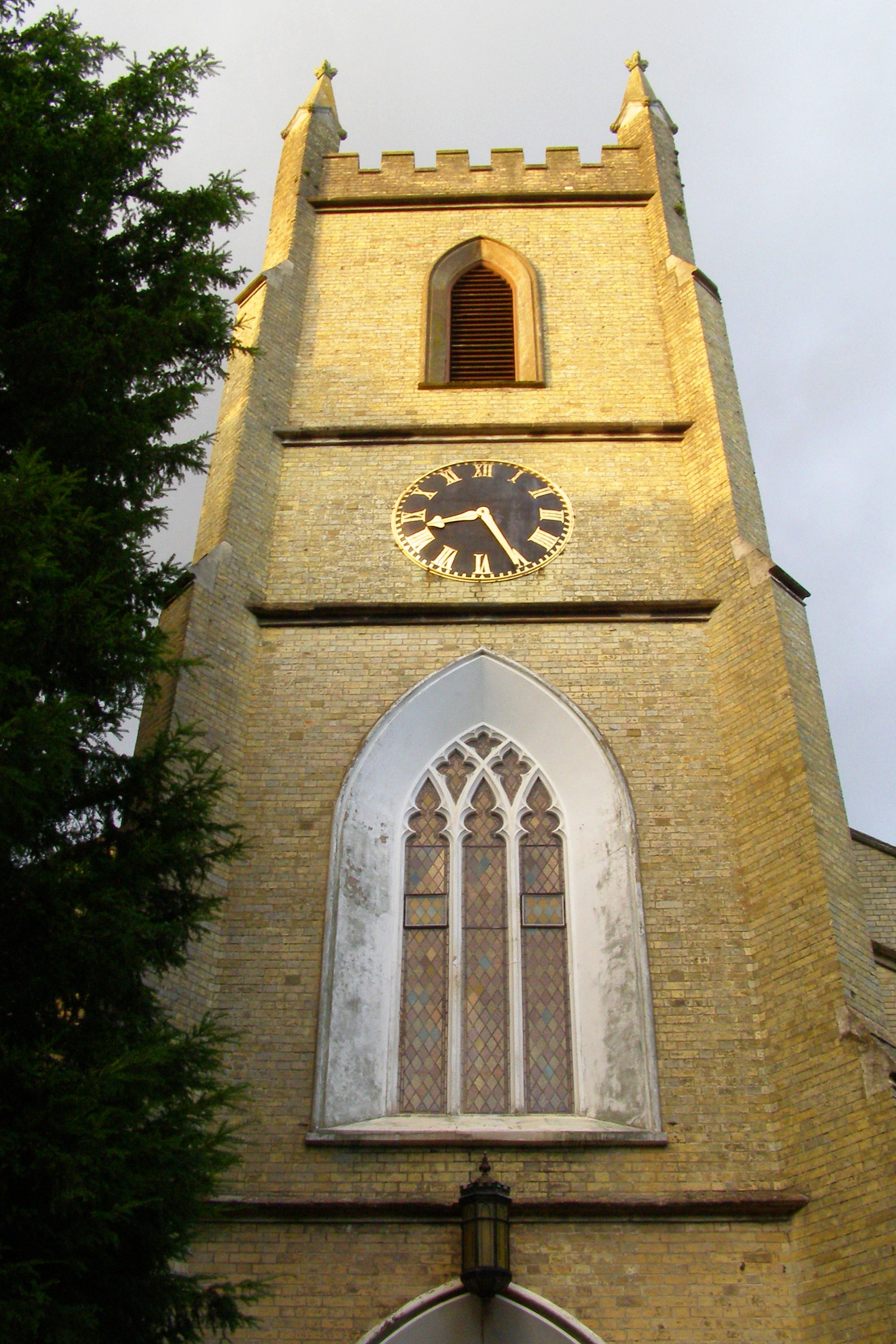
The west face of St James' tower

The Domesday Book records a church being present at Shirley in 1085, but on 1 May 1574 the parish of Shirley was amalgamated with that of Millbrook as the small Shirley congregation could not afford the upkeep of the Shirley church building. The Shirley church was demolished in 1609, with stones from the old building used to enlarge St Nicholas' Church building in Millbrook.

By 1836, the population of the combined parish had reached 2,375 inhabitants, and the old Millbrook parish church was too small. Land was donated for a new church building in Shirley by Nathaniel Newman Jefferys, and Church Building Society combined with private funding to pay for the structure itself. The new church, dedicated to St. James, was designed by local architect William Hinves and consecrated on 20 August 1836 by the Bishop of Winchester with a large crowd present despite "unfavourable weather", according to the Hampshire Advertiser newspaper. The newspaper went on to give this description of the new building:

It contains six hundred sittings. At the back of the altar is a gothic screen, divided into three components, the outer entablatures contain the Commandments, the Lord's Prayer and the Belief, the centre entablature the crucifixion by Shayer, a first rate painting, the head of life itself and the expression of subdued anguish is beautifully conceived and awakes the feeling of an intense degree of interest. It is one of the happiest of his late products.

The building was also described in 1848 as "a handsome structure in the later English style, with a square embattled tower".

The first vicar of Shirley was the Reverend William Orger, who looked after the parish for 25 years. During this time, the church grew quickly, to such an extent that the building was added to within a few years of its consecration. Balconies added in 1840 raised the capacity to 1080. In 1848, only 432 of these pews were free, implying a regular congregation of around 600. A church clock was provided in 1875, and further new pews and a new chancel were added in 1881.

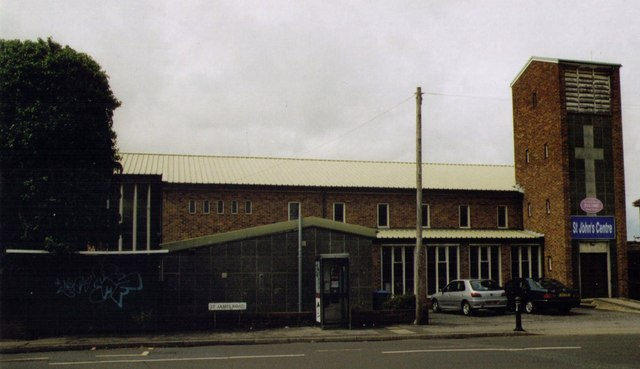
St John's in 2006

In 1912, the parish register for St John's was started, the church being originally based in a temporary tin building. Plans to rebuild St John's church were submitted in 1957, with amended plans submitted and approved in 1959. The foundation stone of the new building was laid by the Bishop of Winchester, Dr Alwyn Williams. The building was subsequently adapted into a community centre named St John's Centre.

The interior of the St James' building was renovated in 1994; the pews were removed and the floor levelled and carpeted. On 1 March 2016, they further updated their seating with the addition of new chairs that now blue and are more cushioned than the previous ones.

In 2020 it was reported that St John's Centre could be demolished and replaced with housing and plans were submitted later that year to replace the building with five houses. Permission for those plans was refused and new plans were submitted in 2021 to replace the St John's building with four houses; this planning application was withdrawn in October 2022. The St John's building was sold to the Church of Pentecost and handed over at a joint celebration in early 2023.
