= John Marshall (Scottish sculptor) =

Scottish sculptor (1888–1952)

John Marshall (1888–1952) was a Scottish sculptor active in the early 20th century. He is noted for doing much of his architectural work in-situ, on the face of the buildings.

== Life ==
He was born in Edinburgh in 1888. He is thought to be descended from John Marshall, marble cutter on Leith Walk who had been a teacher to Thomas Campbell. He trained formally at Edinburgh College of Art.

He worked in partnership with architects such as Sir Robert Lorimer and Sir John James Burnet and executed works designed by fellow sculptors such as Phyllis Bone, Benno Schotz, Pilkington Jackson, Alexander Carrick and Hew Lorimer.

He exhibited in the Royal Scottish Academy 1935 to 1940.

He is known to have sculpted the gravestone for William Marshall, his own son, in Drum Brae Cemetery in 1949.

== Notable works ==
see

- Carvings on the Scotsman newspaper offices, North Bridge, Edinburgh (1899–1902) now the Scotsman Hotel
- Carvings at Lennoxlove House (1908–1912)
- Carvings in the Thistle Chapel, St Giles' Cathedral (1909–1911)
- Chimneypiece, Dunrobin Castle (1915)
- Inverness War Memorial (1920)
- Memorial to Lt Archibald Gifford-Moir, St Mungo's Church, Alloa (c. 1920) (designed by Sir Robert Lorimer)
- Heraldic sculpture, Scottish National War Memorial (1924–1927) with Pilkington Jackson
- Architectural carving, St Patrick's RC Church, Cowgate, Edinburgh (1928–1929)
- Sculpture on Sheffield Central Library (1929–1934)
- Heraldic sculpture, St Andrew's House, Edinburgh (1936–1939)
- Replacement carvings Manchester Cathedral (1945–1950) following damage in the Manchester Blitz
- Gatepiers at Pollok House (1950) to a design by Hew Lorimer
- Leeds Municipal Buildings (date unknown)
