= St Andrew's House =

Office building in Edinburgh

- Taigh Naoimh Anndra
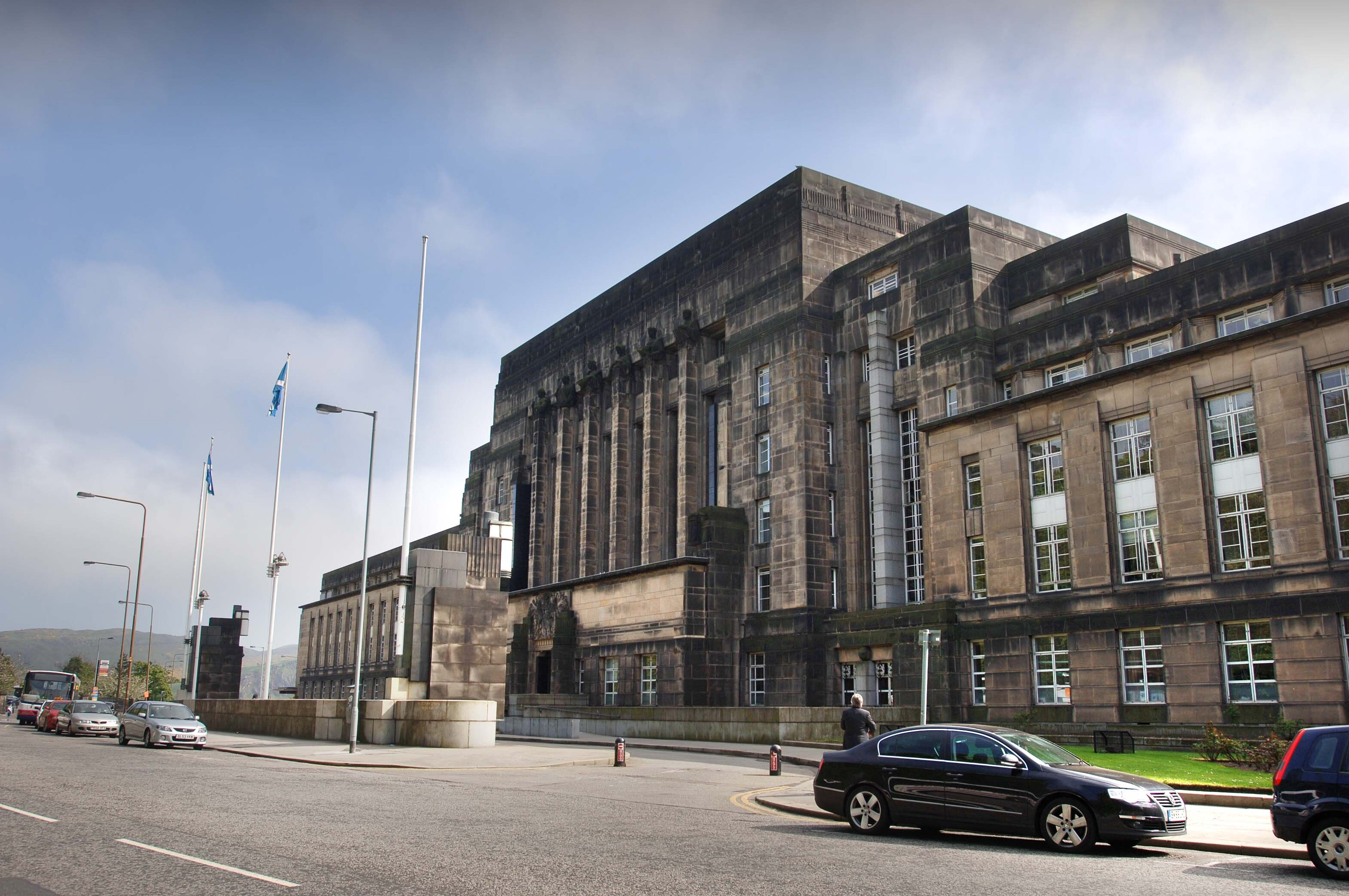
- The front elevation of St Andrew's House
- Interactive map of the St Andrew's House area

General information
- Status: Completed
- Type: Government office
- Architectural style: Art Deco
- Location: 2 Regent Road, Edinburgh, Scotland, EH1 3DG
- Coordinates: 55°57′12.15″N 3°11′2.75″W
- Current tenants: Scottish Government
- Construction started: 1935
- Opened: September 1939; 86 years ago
- Renovated: 2001
- Cost: £433,200
- Owner: Scottish Government

Technical details
- Material: Steel with retaining walls built in reinforced concrete and faced with Darney stone
- Floor count: Eight

Design and construction
- Architect: Thomas S. Tait
- Architecture firm: Burnet, Tait & Lorne
- Other designers: Sir William Reid Dick, Alexander Carrick, Phyllis Bone, Walter Gilbert Thomas Hadden

Other information
- Public transit: St Andrew Square; Edinburgh Waverley

Listed Building – Category A
- Official name: Regent Road, St Andrew's House including boundary wall, lamp standards and gates
- Designated: 14 December 1970
- Reference no.: LB27756

References
- Dictionary of Scottish Architects

St Andrew's House (SAH) (Scottish Gaelic: Taigh Naoimh Anndra), on the southern flank of Calton Hill in central Edinburgh, is an art deco government building which serves as the headquarters of the Scottish Government. The building houses offices for the First Minister and Deputy First Minister, as well as the Permanent Secretary to the Scottish Government.

When completed in 1939, the building was the largest metal-framed building in Europe, and was the first time government departments serving Scotland were brought under the same space in Edinburgh.

Built on the site of the old Calton Jail, the graves of ten murderers who were housed within Calton Jail remain buried beneath the car park for St Andrew's House. The turreted Governor's House is the only remaining part of the Calton Jail to remain in existence following the construction of St Andrew's House. The building accommodates 1,600 civil servants from the Scottish Government over six floors within the building.

== History ==
=== Construction ===
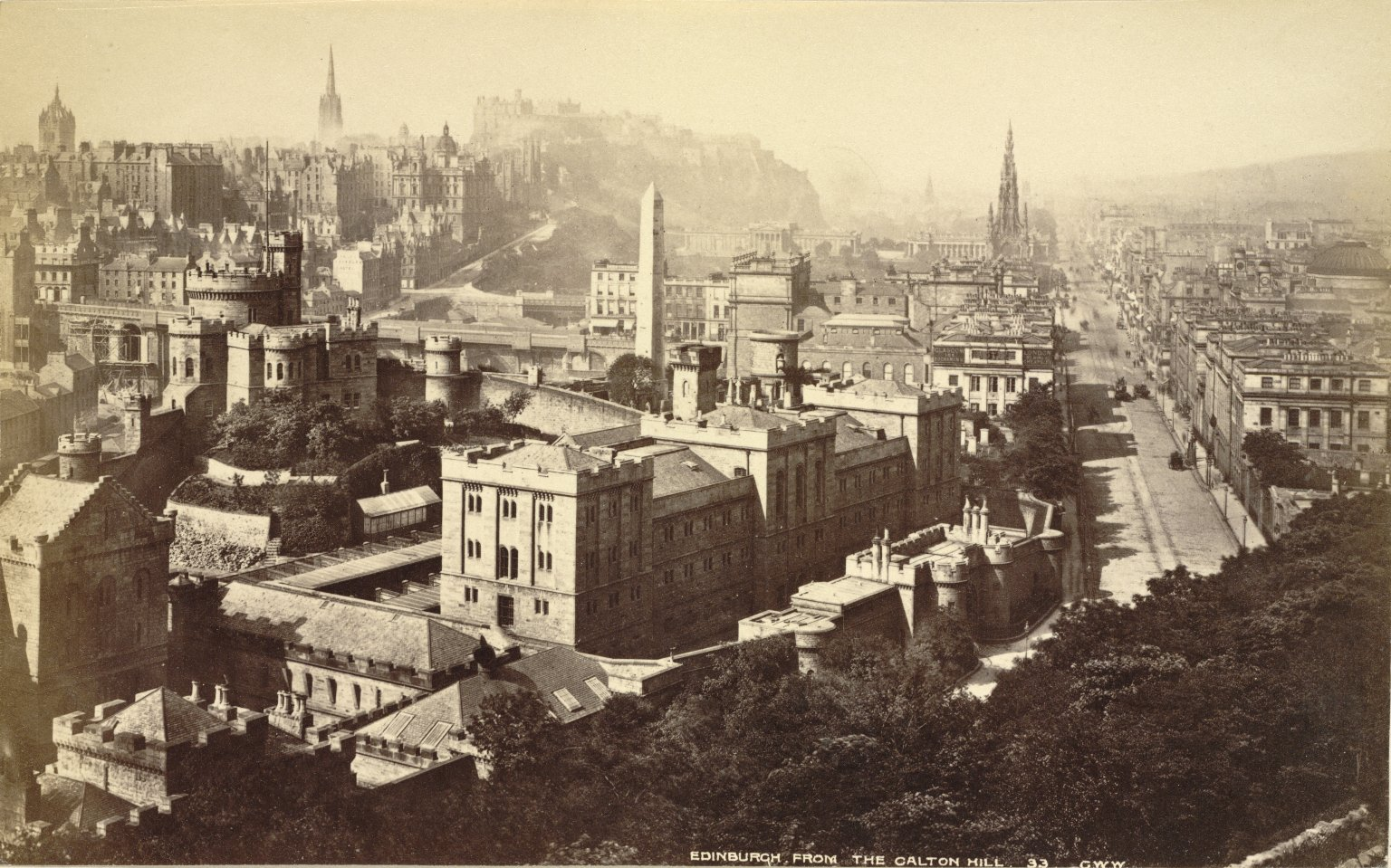
The old Calton Gaol.

The building was designed by Thomas S. Tait of Burnet, Tait and Lorne, architects, who won the architectural competition to gain the commission. Construction began in November 1935 and was completed in 1939; the building initially housed the Scottish Office, including the offices of the Secretary of State for Scotland. The heraldic sculpture on the front is by John Marshall.

The requirement for the building arose as a result of a post First World War policy of limited transfer of devolved administrative (but not legislative) power to Scotland from London. The building opened to staff on Monday 4 September 1939 (the day after War was declared). An official royal opening ceremony timed to take place on 12 October 1939 was "cancelled due to War" (Britain's first air raid of the war took place only four days later over the Forth Bridge). Instead, it was officially opened by King George VI and Queen Elizabeth on 26 February 1940.

=== Completion and opening ===
St Andrew's House was officially completed in 1939 and opened on 4 September 1939. The building was opened less than 24 hours after World War II had officially been declared, and as a consequence, the official opening ceremony due to be attended by the King and Queen planned for the following week was cancelled. Shortly after opening, the building quickly became covered in soot and grime which quickly blackened the facade of the building from nearby passing trams and trains. As a result, plans began to be considered by 1940 for the electrification of trams and railways, however, these plans were ultimately shelved and the electrification of both would not be achieved until fifty years later.

Opening during a war period, the early years of the building were turbulent. The Civil Service had long been preparing and considering attacks on Scotland, with Princes Street Gardens being dismantled and dug up to develop air raid shelters in preparation for air raid attacks by Nazi Germany. Considerable parts of Scotland were also being excavated to develop airfields and other defences, with emergency hospitals created in order to cater for anticipated casualties.

=== World War II ===
St Andrew's House, as a government building, was a considerable target for Nazi Germany. It was the location of the first meetings of the new Council of State and of Scottish MPs convened by Secretary of State for Scotland, Tom Johnston. In preparation for attacks by Nazi Germany, it was decided that large numbers of government files from previous decades were to be destroyed by staff in order to prevent a major conflagration in the event of an incendiary bomb attack. Dover House, the Scottish Office building which is located in London was abandoned for the duration of the war as a consequence of bomb damage to adjoining properties following air raid attacks in London.

Despite air raid attacks occurring across the Forth on October 16, 1939, Edinburgh largely escaped air raid attack during World War II in comparison to other cities.

== Governmental use ==
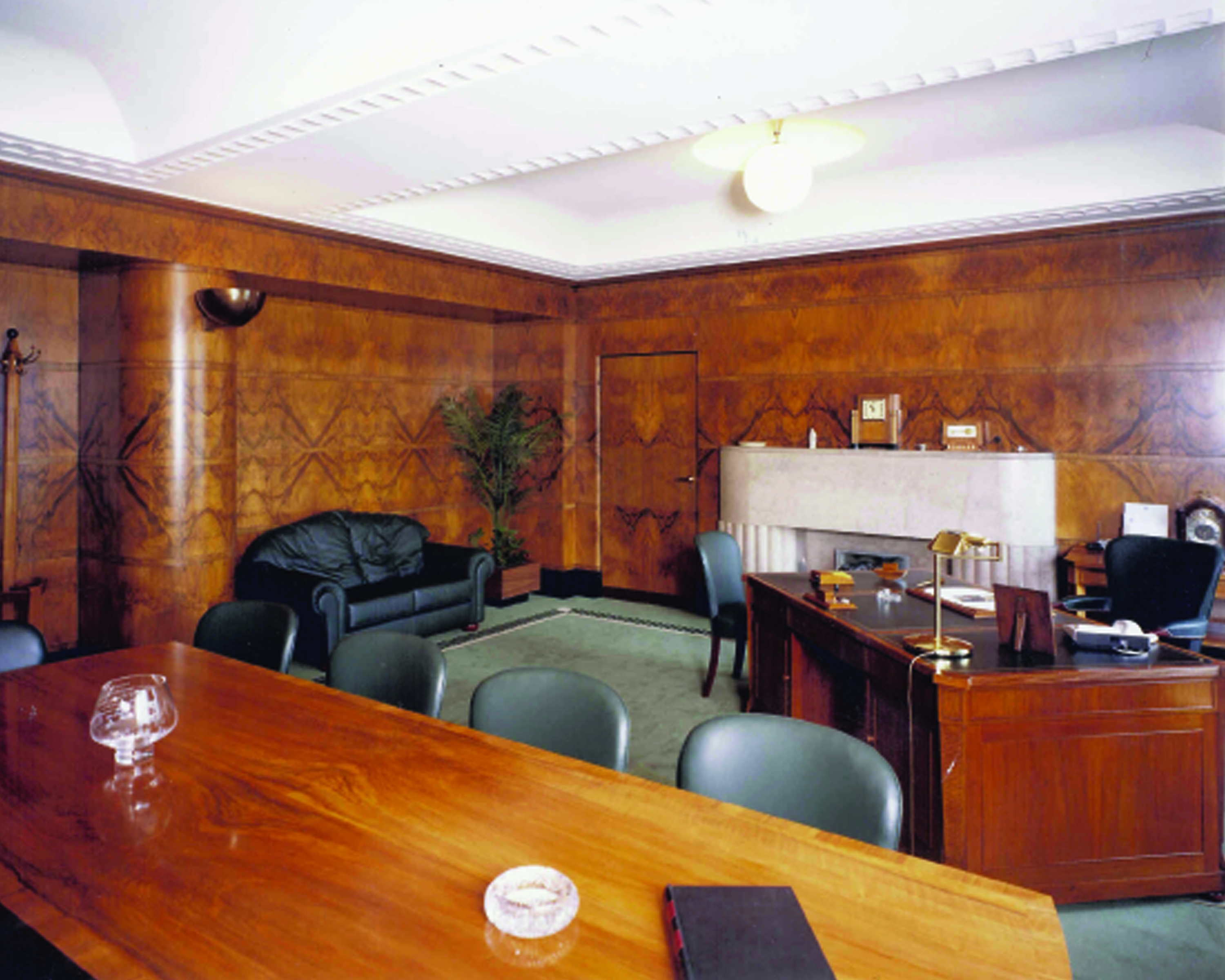
Office of the Permanent Secretary to the Scottish Government in St Andrew's House

St Andrew's House was originally designed and built as the headquarters of the Scottish Office. Following the passing of the Scotland Act 1998, since 1999 St Andrew's House now accommodates part of the Scottish Government, including the office of the First Minister of Scotland and Deputy First Minister of Scotland along with the Private Offices of all the Cabinet Secretaries and the Directorates dealing with justice and health. The building underwent a major refurbishment in 2001, although the facade is still coated in a sooty residue. It now accommodates 1,400 civil servants and has eight floors.

As the headquarters of the Scottish Government, it is the hub of all Scottish Government decision making and is claimed to be where "critical decisions" are made by the Scottish Government. Alongside the core business areas of the Scottish Government and overseeing the health and justice policy of the country, St Andrew's House is home to the office of the First Minister, Deputy First Minister, Cabinet Secretaries and the civil servants and the key corporate functions and bodies who support them. As the headquarters of the Scottish Government, it is frequently used in the news as a backdrop when international media stories break and media stories relating to the Scottish Government.

== Location and architecture ==
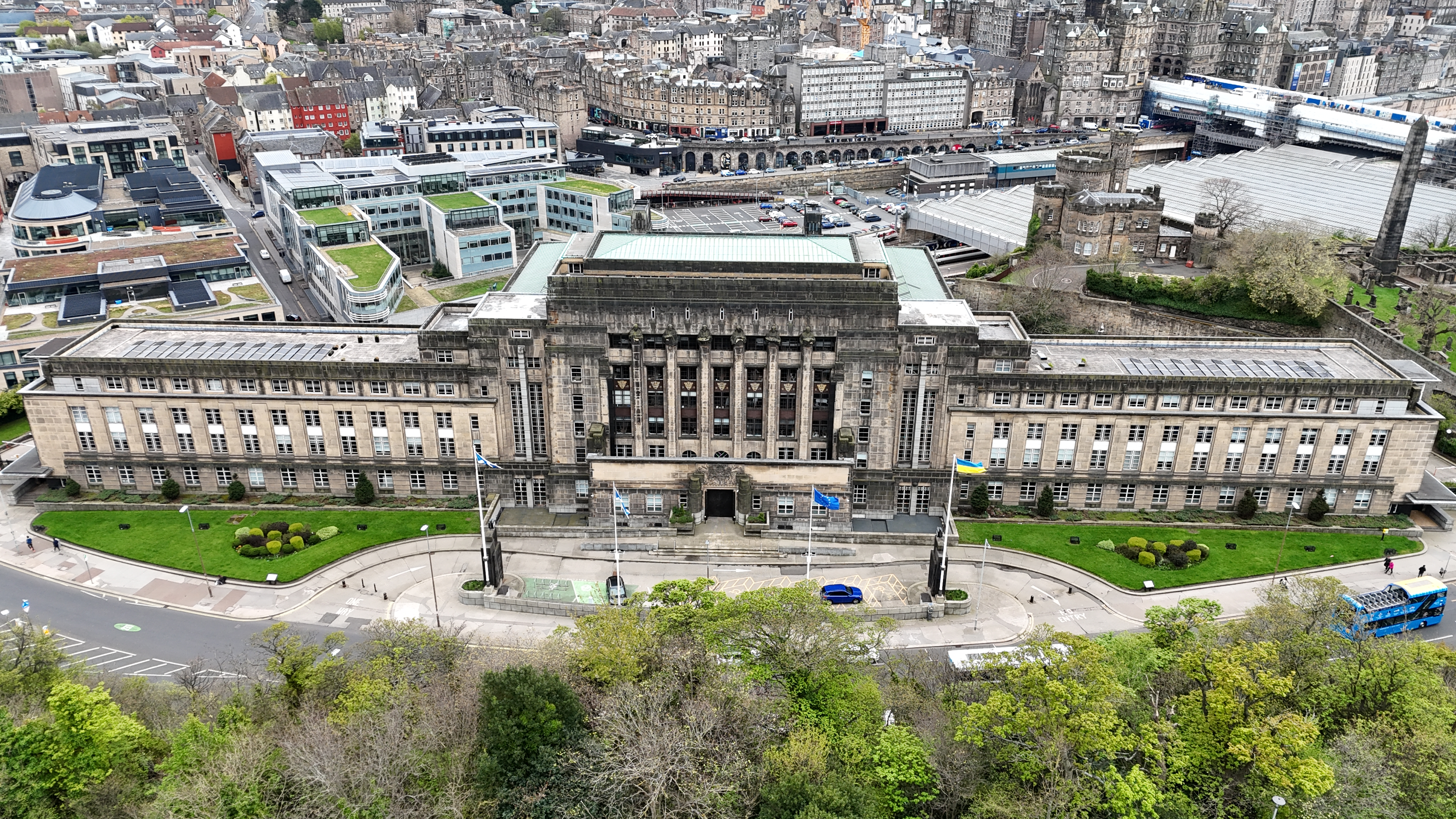
St Andrew's House from above

The building stands on the site of the former Calton Jail. Today, the turreted Governor's House is all that remains of the former prison, next to the Old Calton Burial Ground and Political Martyrs' Monument. The large Category A listed Art Deco-influenced building looks out over Waverley Station, the Canongate and Holyrood Park.

Architecturally, the building is monolithic, symmetrical and restrained on the main north facade. To the south, facing the Waverley valley, it is much more irregular and romantic in expression. Tait's design incorporates elements of Art Deco and Streamline Moderne and is noted for being a rare example of sensitively designed modern architecture in Edinburgh.

The building features a number of sculpted decorations, also in the Art Deco style, which are credited to several sculptors: Sir William Reid Dick designed symbolic figures; heraldic devices are the work of Alexander Carrick and Phyllis Bone; the large bronze doors were designed by Walter Gilbert and executed by H.H. Martyn & Co.; and the secondary doors and stairs are by Thomas Hadden.

St Andrew's House is designated a Category A listed building by Historic Environment Scotland.
