= Alexander Carrick =

Scottish sculptor (1882-1966)

Alexander Carrick RSA (20 February 1882 – 26 January 1966) was a Scottish sculptor. He was one of Scotland's leading monumental sculptors of the early part of the 20th century. He was responsible for many architectural and ecclesiastical works as well as many war memorials executed in the period following World War I. As head of sculpture at Edinburgh College of Art, and as a leading member of the Royal Scottish Academy, Carrick had a lasting influence on Scottish sculpture.

== Early years ==
Alexander Carrick was born in 1882, the son of a blacksmith in the small town of Musselburgh, just east of Edinburgh. In 1897 he enrolled as a student at Edinburgh College of Art and was apprenticed as a stonemason working in the yard of one of the prominent monumental sculptors of the period, Birnie Rhind. He won the Queen's Prize allowing him to go to London to study for two years at the South Kensington College under the French-born sculptor Professor Édouard Lantéri. He then returned to Edinburgh, spending a further two years working under another of the leading Scottish sculptors of the period, Pittendrigh MacGillivray.

In the years running up to World War I Carrick was to become a regular exhibitor at the RSA exhibitions, his exhibition works including A Boy Putting a Stone, A Girl Skipping, and Saint Cecilia. He also established his reputation as a monumental artist working on prestigious construction projects such as the Usher Hall and the Scotsman Building, both in Edinburgh; restoration works at Eilean Donan Castle and St. Magnus' Cathedral in Kirkwall; and also carrying out extensive work in the unusual Saint Conan's Kirk at Loch Awe. Whilst at the Edinburgh College of Art, Carrick met his wife, Janet Ferguson MacGregor, who was studying painting there, and the couple were married in 1914. Their first child, Elizabeth, was born in 1915, (followed later by Anne, who herself became an artist).

== World War I ==
In 1916 Carrick joined the Royal Garrison Artillery and served in Belgium throughout the war (The location of sketches which he made at this time have been identified as lying just north of the village of Ypres). On one occasion a shell prematurely exploded in his battery and he was badly shocked. Due to the epidemics sweeping the military hospitals at the time, he was left in the house of an old Belgian woman, who he remembered had simply allowed him to sleep for days at a time. In 1916 he modelled the figure of an artilleryman lifting a shell, 'The Gunner', which was exhibited at that year's RSA Exhibition in Edinburgh and received some acclaim, including an article in 'The Studio' appearing in 1924. In 1918 he was elected an Associate of the Royal Scottish Academy while still in Belgium.

== Post World War I ==
The Killin war memorial. Carrick's soldier bears some resemblance to Michelangelo's David, but while Michelangelo's figure grasps a primitive sling, Carrick's grasps the sling of a rifle.

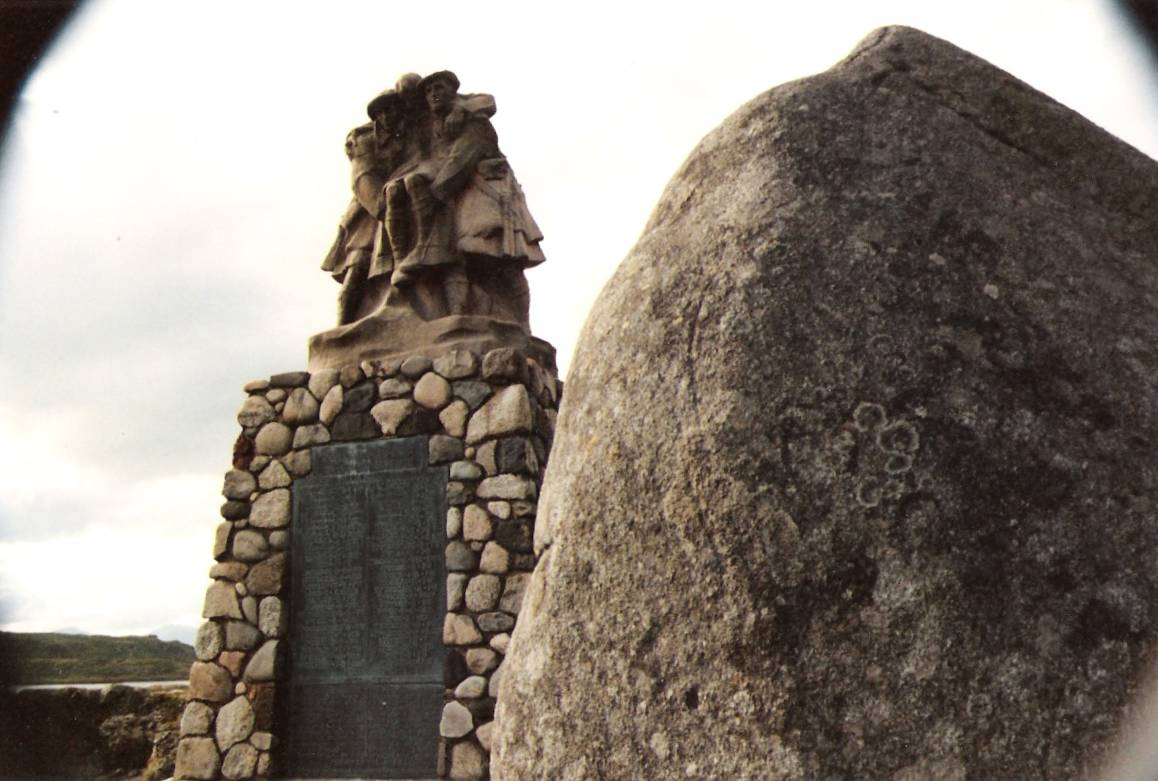
Oban war memorial. The large rock, a glacial erratic, provides an interesting foil for the monument, indeed the shape is so similar that it may have been the inspiration for Carrick's figurative group

After the war Carrick quickly re-established his yard in Edinburgh and again began exhibiting at the RSA with 'Jock' and 'With Bayonet and Bomb'. During the period from 1920 until around 1926 he was heavily involved in war memorial work. Carrick was a stone carver and preferred working in freestone, especially Doddington stone quarried in the Cheviots. War memorials featuring his carved sculptures include Lochawe, Killin, Oban, St Margaret's Hope, Kinghorn, Newburgh and Auchtermuchty.

The Fraserburgh war memorial featuring Carrick's allegorical group 'Justice Guiding Valour'. 'Justice' restrains 'Valour' with a light touch of her finger, an action which is perhaps reminiscent of the light touch of the angel waking the Magi on the capital at Autun by Gislebertus.

He later received a commission from the South African Scottish Regimental Association to carve a copy of the Killin soldier for their own memorial which stands in Burghers Park in Pretoria. Carrick also executed figures in bronze, including the figures of soldiers for the Dornoch, Forres, Blairgowrie and Walkerburn war memorials, and allegorical figures including 'Winged Victory' for Berwick Upon Tweed and 'Justice Guiding Valour' for the Fraserburgh war memorial. Despite being heavily engaged in this work, he did execute some other commissions in the early 1920s including carving the stone figures of 'The Leopard', 'The Vulture', and 'The Kangaroo' for the Animal Wall extension at Cardiff Castle, and the tomb featuring the recumbent figure of Walter Campbell of Lochawe in Saint Conan's Kirk.

== Edinburgh Castle ==
Carrick's 8-foot bronze of Sir William Wallace, at Edinburgh Castle. Carrick was criticised over the proportions of this figure, but it may be that he was subtly adapting the proportions of the body to the stones of the wall itself, thus integrating Wallace and wall. More recently, it was during a visit to Edinburgh that American screenwriter Randall Wallace saw this statue and was inspired to write the script for the Mel Gibson film Braveheart.

Scotland made one final act of remembrance in the late 1920s with the erection of the Scottish National War Memorial in Edinburgh Castle. Carrick was responsible for the small carved virtues of 'Courage' and 'Justice', set in the niches above the entrance, and the bronze figurative panels commemorating the Royal Engineers and Royal Artillery in the East Chapel (a copy of the Royal Engineers panel was recently made for the Royal Engineers Museum). In 1929, Carrick's figure of Sir William Wallace was also unveiled in Edinburgh Castle. As part of the bequest of one Captain Reid, a competition was held for the design of statues depicting Scotland's national heroes Sir William Wallace and King Robert the Bruce to stand in niches set into the castle wall on either side of the gateway. It was a highly controversial scheme, attracting widespread debate and criticism in the Scottish press throughout 1928 and 1929. Finally a compromise was reached, the commission for Wallace being awarded to Carrick, and Bruce awarded to the sculptor T. J. Clapperton, while Sir Robert Lorimer's Gothic design was chosen for the niches.

== 1930s onwards ==
Carrick's group 'Security' on the Caledonian Insurance Building, Edinburgh. The bronze has an unusual green patina and the group was based on Carrick's diploma work 'Felicity'

With the end of the war memorial period and the onset of the economic depression, Carrick undertook many smaller works including continuing renovations and repairs at George Heriot's School in Edinburgh, Pollok House in Glasgow, and Dunnotar Castle. He also executed several memorial tablets featuring portraits, including that to Sir Walter Scott on the front of Jedburgh Sheriff Court, and one to the founder of the Boys' Brigade, William A. Smith in St. Giles' Cathedral, Edinburgh. The University of Edinburgh also constructed the King's Buildings extension and Carrick was responsible for the stone relief above the doorway of the Geology department, featuring the allegorical figure of Geology studying an ammonite. In the late 1930s he worked on Saint Andrew's House, the new government buildings in Edinburgh, to the designs of the London sculptor William Reid Dick. Carrick's last prestigious work was that of the bronze groups 'Safety' and 'Security' which stand on pillars at the entrance to the Caledonian Insurance Building (now GRE Building ) in Saint Andrew Square, Edinburgh.

With the outbreak of World War II construction work dried up and conscription claimed most of his students at the college. Carrick was forced into an early retirement and he and his wife Janet settled in their holiday cottage at Midlem in the Scottish Borders. The couple considered creating a studio at the cottage but this never happened. Carrick's work appeared at an RSA Exhibition for the last time in 1954 when the bronze busts of his two grandchildren were displayed. He died in Galashiels in 1966.

== Teacher and academician ==
Carrick was appointed to the teaching staff of Edinburgh College of Art in 1914 and in 1928 was appointed head of the sculpture department. Carrick was commented on as having a strong and forthright personality and a good sense of humour which made him a popular and highly influential figure at the Royal Scottish Academy. He was never formally trained as a teacher but seems to have been a natural, who could instil in his students his own enthusiasm and love for his subject. In this role he helped to create a new generation of Scottish sculptors and was very influential, especially in his encouragement of the craft of carving. His students included Phyllis Bone, a near contemporary and lifelong friend who gained an international reputation as an animal sculptor, and the Art Deco potter Emma Smith Gillies. The headmaster of Wick Academy brought his son, Scott Sutherland, to Edinburgh to discuss his son's ambitions to become a sculptor. Carrick reassured the concerned father and Scott soon began his studies in Edinburgh, which would establish him in a long career, producing many acclaimed works, the most famous being the Commando Memorial at Spean Bridge. An unemployed ship's carpenter from Leith named Thomas Whalen wandered into one of Carrick's evening classes after spending years whittling away on pieces of scrap wood. Carrick immediately recognised his potential, and Whalen became one of the leading artists of the post war period in Scotland. Hew Lorimer, son of the famous architect Sir Robert Lorimer, was one of Carrick's students and became an established artist, producing many ecclesiastical works including 'Our Lady of the Isles' on South Uist. Carrick's influence arguably ensured that sculpture retained its status and prestige within the Academy, for example by travelling to Paris in 1938 and persuading the leading French sculptors of the period to travel to Edinburgh for a special exhibition of French sculpture in 1939.

== Bibliography and references ==
Business Papers – Lodged with the National Monument Record of Scotland office, Edinburgh

Scottish National Gallery of Modern Art Archive ( photocopies of the Carrick collection of press cuttings )

The Studio Vol. LXXXVIII, No.379, October 1924 ( short article on 'The Gunner' )

The Scots Magazine, November 1992 ( article written by this author )

Author's notes taken on two interviews with Anne and Elizabeth Carrick, 1992 (Copies lodges with RSA and SNGMA)

Modelling and Sculpting the Human Figure, Edouard Lanteri, Dover 0-486-25006-7

Virtue and Vision, Sculpture and Scotland 1540–1990, National Galleries of Scotland

Hew Lorimer Sculptor, Talbot Rice Gallery Exhibition Programme, University of Edinburgh, Duncan MacMillan 1988.

Oban Times – 17 November 1923 (unveiling of Oban war memorial) Oban Times – 17 July 1920 (unveiling of Lochawe war memorial) Orkney Herald – 24 August 1921 (unveiling of Saint Margaret's Hope war memorial) The Scotsman – 18 June 1923 (re Oban war memorial) The Scotsman – 14 October 1931 (re Killin war memorial) The Scotsman – 18 June 1922 (re Dornoch war memorial) The Scotsman – 6 January 1928 (re wallace and Bruce, Edinburgh Castle) The Scotsman – 14 February 1929 (Carrick elected A.R.S.A.) The Scotsman – 29 May 1929 (unveiling of Wallace, Edinburgh Castle) The Scotsman – 26 April 1930 (The woman of Samaria at the Well, Reid Memorial Church, Edinburgh) The Scotsman – 3 November 1931 (re 'Geology', Edinburgh University) The Scotsman – 16 September 1932 (re Sir Walter Scott memorial, Jedburgh) The Scotsman – 31 May 1933 (re unveiling of memorial plaque to Sir John Gordon, Bart. of Haddo in St. Gile's Cathedral) The Scotsman – 20 May 1939 ('Security') The Scotsman – 19 June 1939 (Phyllis Bone interview, North Berwick Memorial) The Scots Pictorial – 23 September 1922 (re Killin war memorial) The Builder – 10 November 1922 (article re Newburgh war memorial) The Glasgow Herald – 29 May 1929 (unveiling of Wallace, Edinburgh Castle)

The Northern Scot – 8 June 1922 (unveiling of Dornoch war memorial) Forres, Elgin and Nairn Gazette – 30 August 1922 (unveiling of Forres war memorial) The Northern Scot – 25 December 1920 (re fund raising for Forres war memorial) The Northern Scot – Saturday, September 1922 (unveiling of Forres war memorial) The Berwick Advertiser – 16 November 1923 (unveiling of Berwick on Tweed war memorial)
