= Phyllis Bone =

British sculptor

- Born: Phyllis Mary Bone; 15 February 1894; Hornby, Lancashire, England
- Died: 12 July 1972 (aged 78); Dumfries, Scotland
- Education: Edinburgh College of Art
- Occupation: Sculptor
- Known for: Animal sculptor

Phyllis Mary Bone RSA (15 February 1894 – 12 July 1972) was a 20th-century Scottish sculptor. She was the first female Academician of the Royal Scottish Academy. Although primarily the creator of small figurines, her works include several commissions at national level.

== Life ==
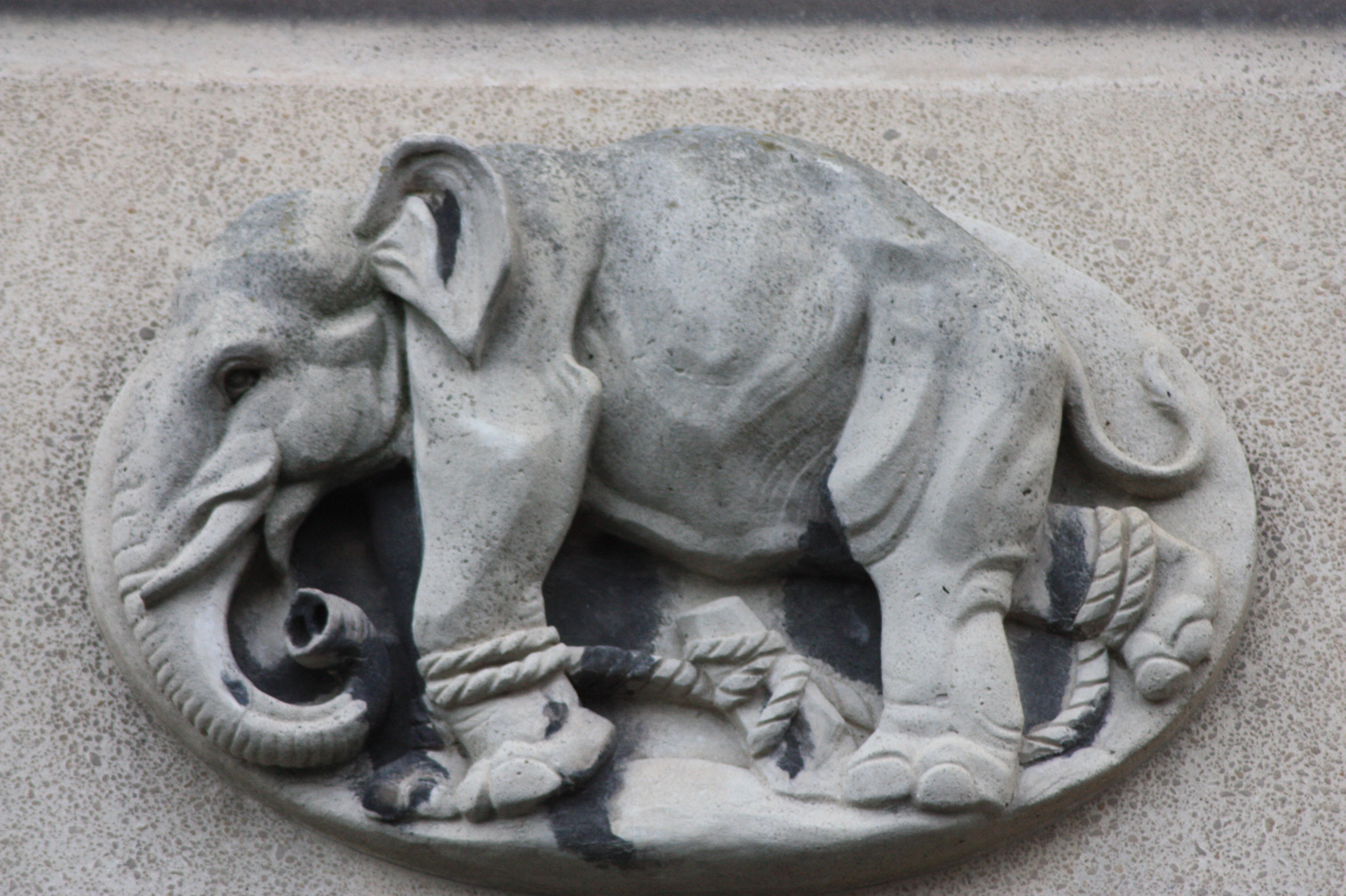
Elephant roundel by Phyllis Bone on Ashworth Laboratories, Kings Buildings, Edinburgh

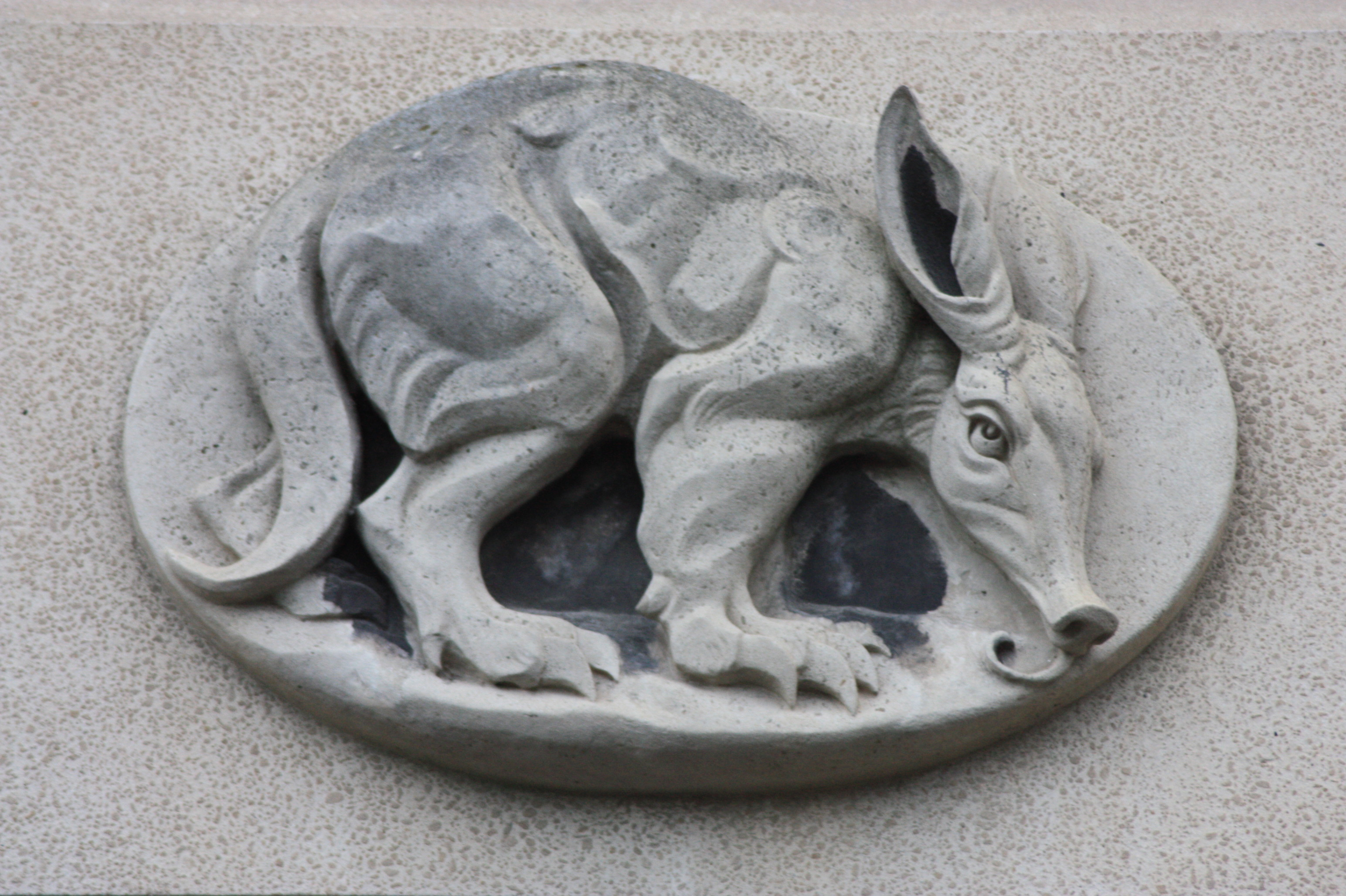
Aardvark by Phyllis Bone

Bone was born in Hornby, Lancashire, the daughter of Dr Douglas Mayhew Bone and his wife Mary Campbell Smith. As a child she had a great love for animals, her pet pony and retriever were the first models for drawing. She also enjoyed visiting Edinburgh's Zoological Park, studying, drawing and eventually sculpting animals. This fascination with the shapes and actions of animals influenced her pursuit in becoming an animal sculptor.

== Education and training ==
Bone was educated at St George School for Girls in Edinburgh then trained as a sculptor at Edinburgh College of Art (1912–18) under Alexander Carrick, Pilkington Jackson and Percy Portsmouth. She received a diploma in Sculpture in 1918. During this time she also twice travelled to Paris, under a travel scholarship, to train specifically as an animal sculptor under Edouard Navellier. This travel scholarship and tutoring by Navellier was something her fellow Edinburgh College Art alumna, the sculptor Mary Syme Boyd, would also undertake over ten years later between 1929 and 1933.

== Work ==
Bone served in the Women's Legion as a driver during the First World War.

In Scotland, Bone quickly gained fame as an animal sculptor. At first she worked within the Holyrood Pottery but soon became independent. She took up residence first at 5 Alva Street in Edinburgh where she lived until 1935. Bone was elected an associate member of the Royal Scottish Academy in 1939, being nominated by Benno Schotz, and was the first woman to be elected a full member of the Academy in 1940.

Originally she shared studios with the Scottish Colourists at the Albert Gallery, 24 Shandwick Place, Edinburgh. She latterly largely worked at the Dean studios in Dean Village (1935–50). From 1946 onwards she began spending more time in Galloway, taking a second home in Newton Stewart whilst in Edinburgh thereafter only retaining a small basement flat at 7 Randolph Cliff. In 1950 she left Edinburgh permanently and joined an artists' colony on the Solway Firth, living thereafter at Hillview, Barrhill Road, Kirkcudbright. Her work was also part of the sculpture event in the art competition at the 1948 Summer Olympics.

She died in Dumfries Hospital and was cremated in Warriston Crematorium in Edinburgh. Her portrait (by Robert Sivell) is held in the Gracefield Collection in Dumfries.

== Public works ==
- Lion and unicorn flanking the entrance of the Scottish National War Memorial (1924–7) working with Pilkington Jackson and Sir Robert Lorimer plus internal roundels relating to animals used by the troops during World War I (carrier pigeons, mules etc.)
- Animal Masks on the Metropolitan-Vickers Building (now Fortune House), 74 Waterloo Street, Glasgow (1925–7)
- Restoration of St John’s Church in Perth (1926) working with Sir Robert Lorimer
- Animal carvings on the Zoology Building, Edinburgh University's Kings Buildings (1928–9) working with Sir Robert Lorimer
- Animal carvings, Lady Sanderson Cottage Homes, Galashiels (1930–3) working with Pilkington Jackson
- Royal coat of arms (including the lion and the unicorn), St Andrews House, Edinburgh (1936–9) working with John Marshall and Alexander Carrick
- Lettering on Kirkcudbright Tolbooth (date unknown)
- The Leopard, the pair of Raccoons and the vulture on the perimeter wall of Cardiff Castle (subcontracted by Alexander Carrick, Scottish Sculptor )
