= Thomas Hadden =

Thomas Hadden (1871–1940) was a Scottish maker of ornamental ironwork from wrought iron, particularly for the architect Robert Lorimer.

== Life ==
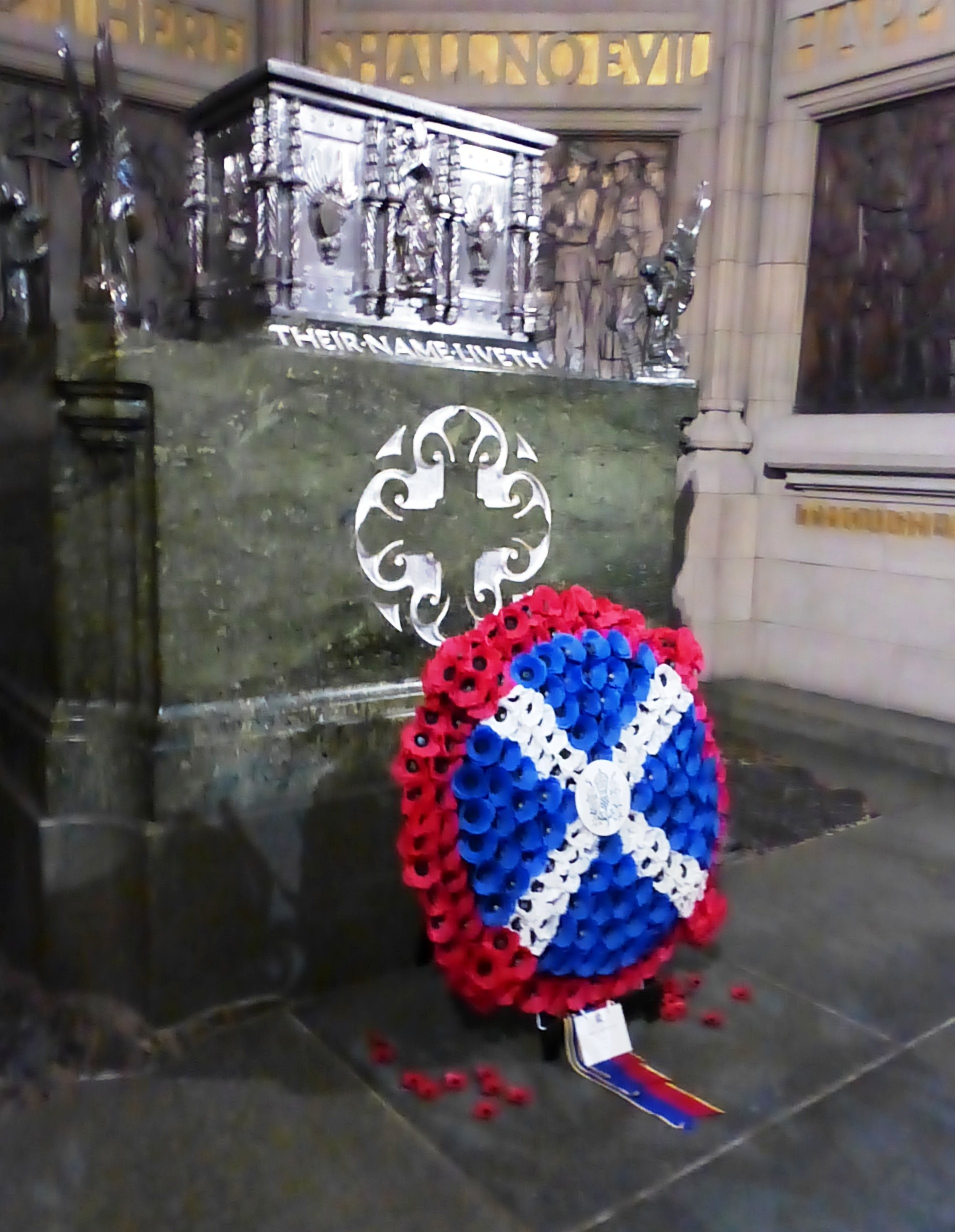
The casket in the Scottish National War Memorial, by Thomas Hadden (1927)

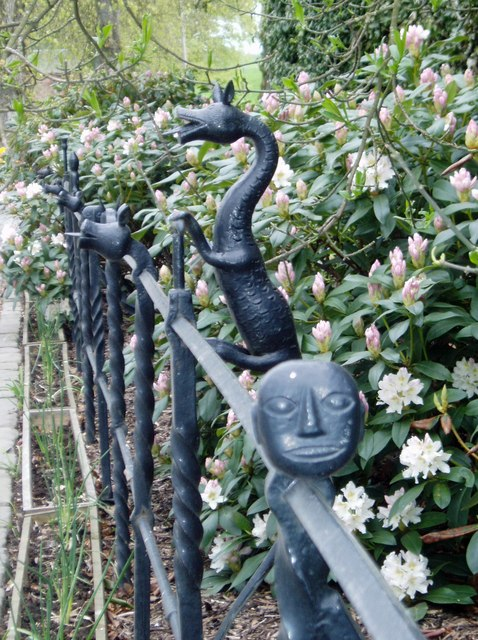
Ornamental railings by Thomas Hadden at Skirling

Hadden was born in Hamilton, South Lanarkshire in 1871. He came from an ironworking family, and served an apprenticeship at Howgate near Edinburgh; he then worked for James Milne and Sons in Edinburgh, and in London. In 1901 he founded a business with his brother, a woodcarver.

He acquired a reputation for his skill in metalworking; an important part of his work came from architectural commissions, particularly from the Arts and Crafts architect Robert Lorimer.

Hadden died in 1940, and his nephew Robert continued the business, making architectural ironwork. The company closed in 1975.

== Artistic work ==
The company produced gates, railings, and other features including weather vanes and shop sign. Hadden's work for Robert Lorimer included the wrought iron gates for the Thistle Chapel in St Giles' Cathedral, Edinburgh (1911), and the casket for the Scottish National War Memorial in Edinburgh (1927). Other commissions included railings for Lord Carmichael's house in Skirling and a set of pendants to illuminate the North and South aisle and nave of Dunblane Cathedral.

After the Second World War, commissions by the firm included the Quincentenery gates for the University of Glasgow (1952) and the memorial gates for George Heriot's School (1959).
