= Hew Lorimer =

Scottish sculptor (1907–1993)

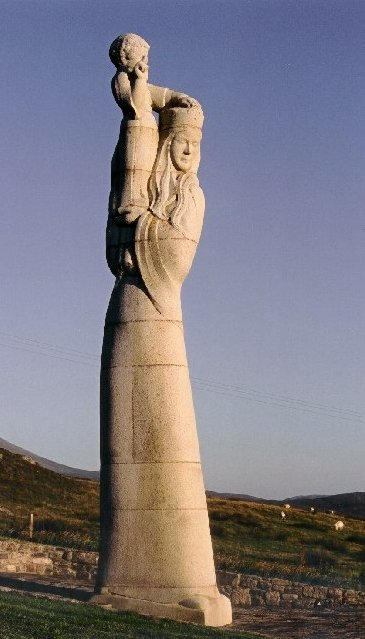
Our Lady of the Isles on South Uist.

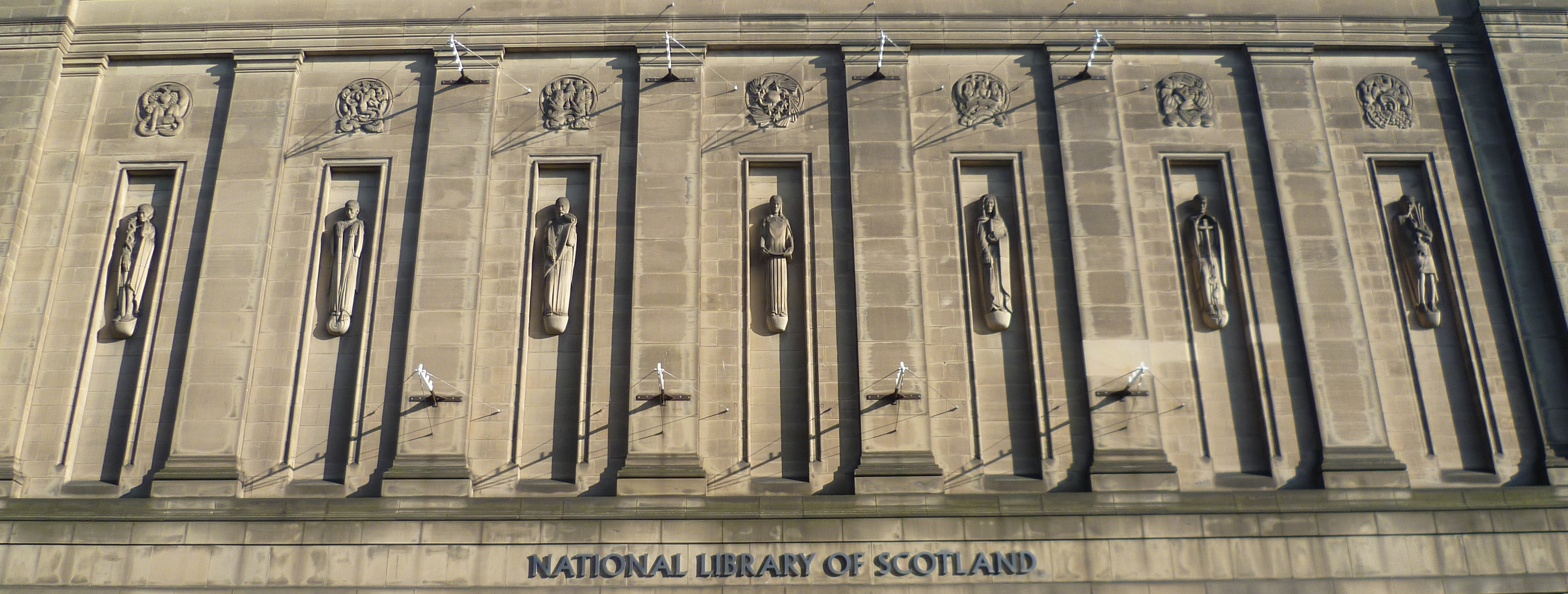
Figures on the National Library of Scotland

Hew Martin Lorimer, OBE (22 May 1907 – 1 September 1993) was a Scottish sculptor.

== Early life ==
He was born in Edinburgh, the second son of architect Sir Robert Lorimer. He was educated at Loretto School in Musselburgh, then at Magdalen College, Oxford University, but he left Oxford prematurely to study design and sculpture under Alexander Carrick at the Edinburgh College of Art. After graduating in 1934, he entered an apprenticeship with sculptor and stonemason Eric Gill.

== Sculptor ==
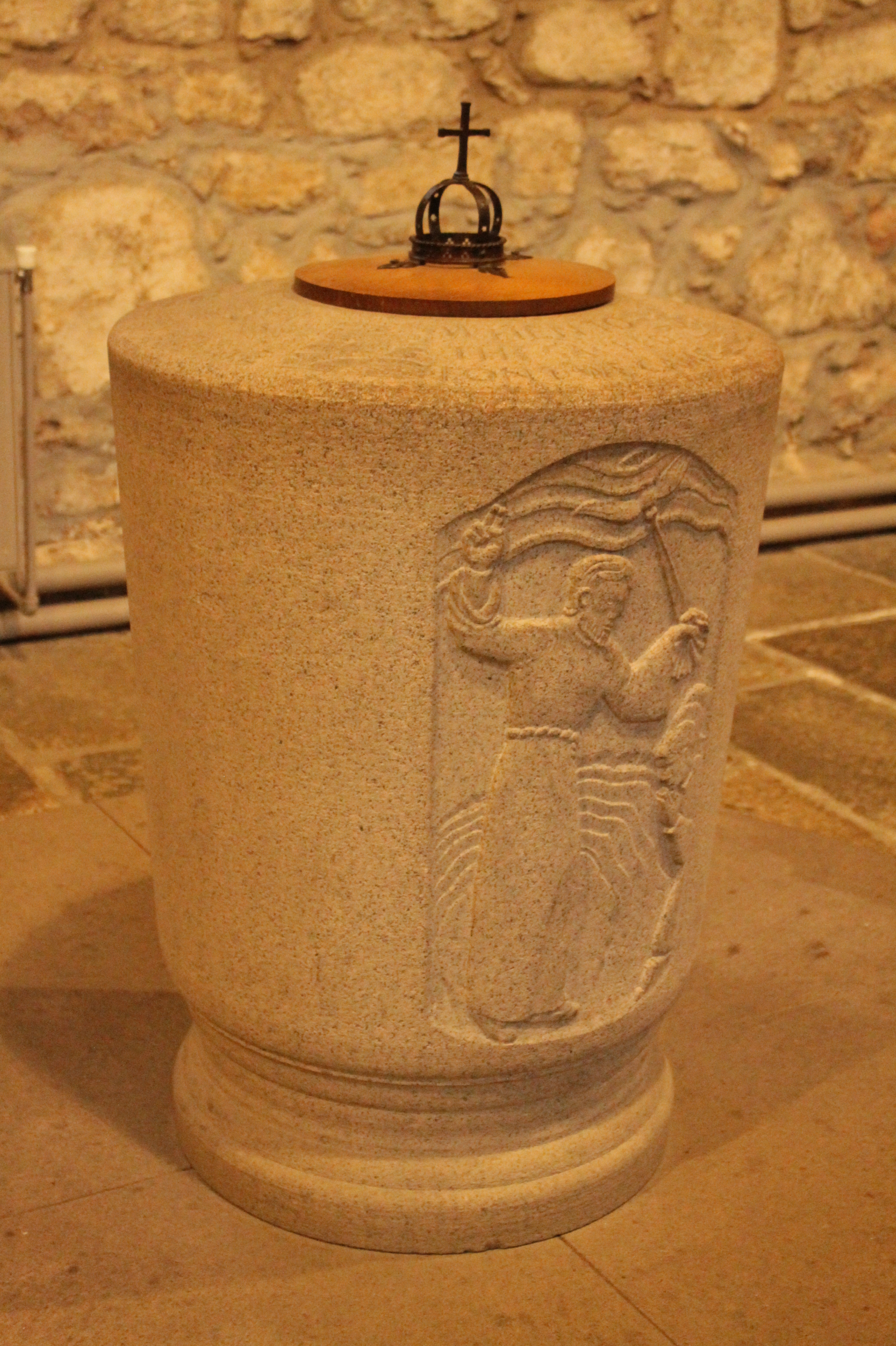
The font at St Machar's Cathedral by Hew Lorimer

Lorimer was principally an architectural sculptor, and his profound religious beliefs had a lasting effect on his art and subject matter. After World War II, he worked on many grand sculptures, including Our Lady of the Isles, 1958, a massive granite statue of the mother and child sited at Rueval on South Uist.

Between 1950 and 1955 he also sculpted the artwork adorning the facade of the National Library of Scotland in Edinburgh, for which he produced a series of tall, allegorical figures, depicting history, law, medicine, music, poetry, science and theology. The architect of the library was Reginald Fairlie, who had been apprentice to Lorimer's father Robert. Lorimer carved the figures directly into the stone rather than copying from clay models, a practice known as direct carving. Also for Fairlie, Lorimer created a massive tympanum frieze showing St Francis returning to Assisi for The Friary in Dundee in 1959.

Crucifix on exterior east wall of St Martin and St Ninian Church, Whithorn (1959). Has suffered some damage and loss of detail after a botched cleaning job in 1987.

A statue of St Meddan in niche above the main entrance to Our Lady of the Assumption and St Meddan's Church in Troon.

The font of St Machar's Cathedral (1954).

One of Lorimer's final public commissions was the statue of Christ on the Cross for the University of Dundee Chaplaincy (1983, completed in 1986).

== Honours ==
He was awarded an OBE in 1986 for services to architecture and conservation.

== Published works ==
- The Lorimers, a family of the arts in Fife: an exhibition for the 1983 St. Andrews Festival. Crawford Centre for the Arts. 1983. ISBN 9780906272084.

== Personal life ==
Hew was the nephew of the Scottish painter John Henry Lorimer and the grandson of Prof. James Lorimer, lawyer and academic. Lorimer lived in Kellie Castle in Fife, and died in a nursing home in St Andrews in 1993. He is survived by his sons, Robert and Henry, and daughter, Monica.

The castle is owned today by the National Trust for Scotland who maintain a changing exhibition of his works plus those of his father, Robert Lorimer, and his uncle, the painter John Henry Lorimer.
