= Scottish National War Memorial =

Monument in Edinburgh Castle

Coordinates: 55.9485°N 3.1997°W

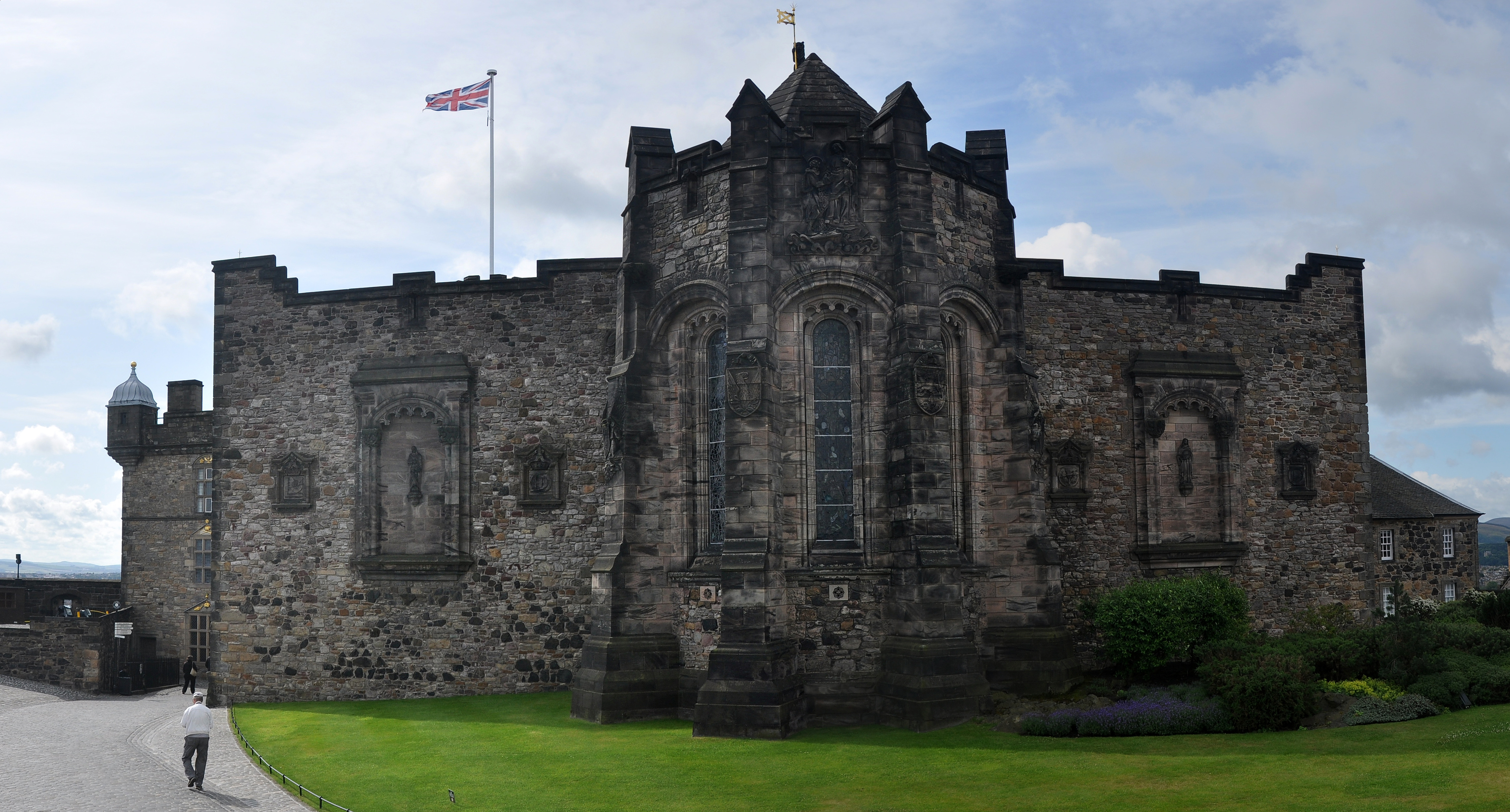
Scottish National War Memorial, rear elevation. The two niche statues are (left to right) 'Charity' and 'Truth'. The relief carving 'The Calling of St Andrew' by Alice Meredith-Williams sits above the centre window.

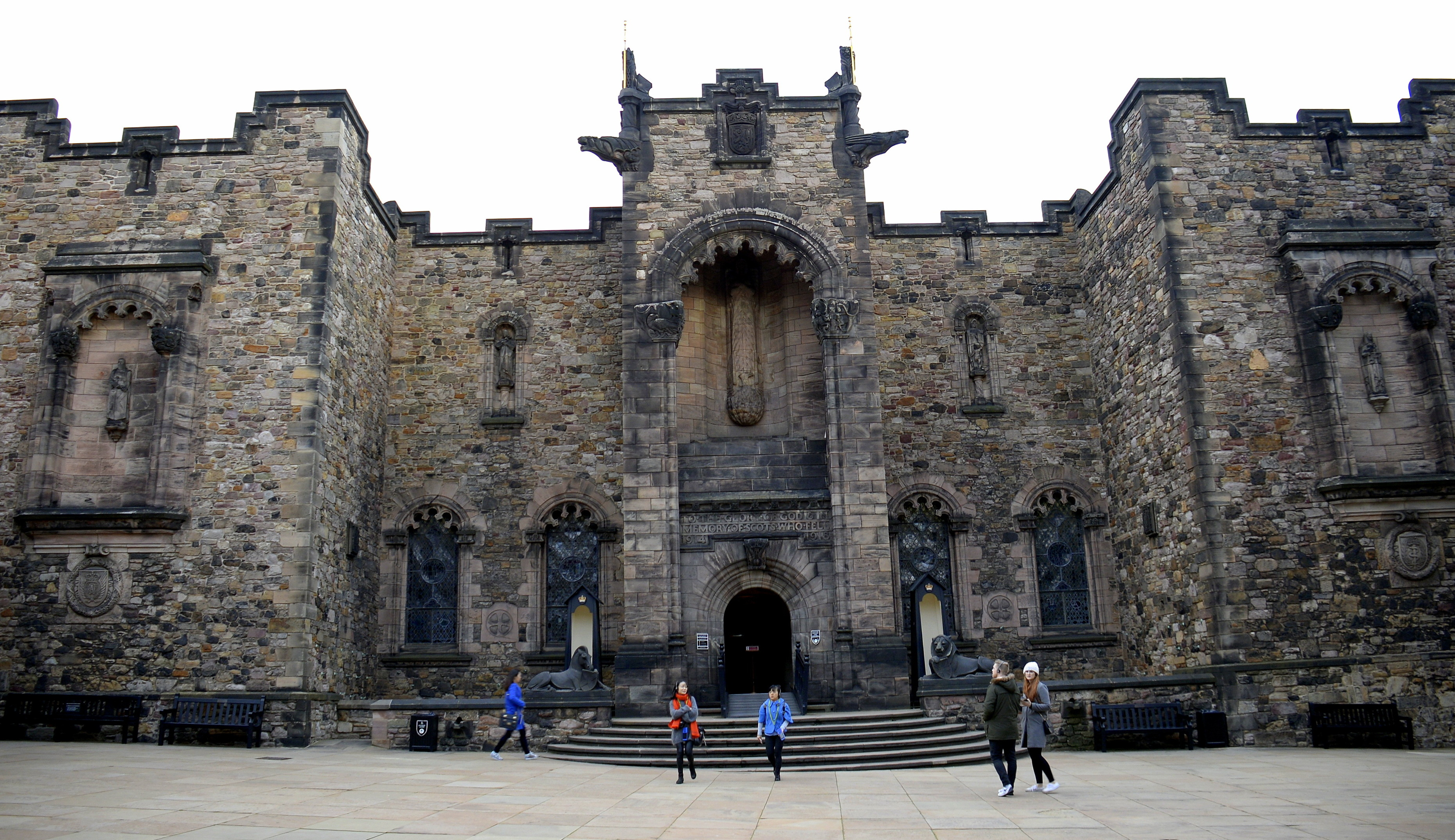
The entrance and façade of the Scottish National War Memorial. The five niche statues are (left to right) 'Courage', 'Peace', 'Survival of the Spirit' (above the porch), 'Mercy' and 'Justice'.

The Scottish National War Memorial is located in Edinburgh Castle and commemorates Scottish service personnel and civilians, and those serving with Scottish regiments, who died in the two world wars and subsequent conflicts. Its chief architect was Robert Lorimer, commissioned in 1919, and the monument was formally opened in 1927. It is housed in a redeveloped barrack block in Crown Square, at the heart of the castle, and incorporates numerous monuments.

The Rolls of Honour kept in the memorial include the names of those Scots servicemen and women and Scots civilians that died in all wars after 1914. This includes all Scots who were killed as a result of enemy action or who died as a result of wounds, diseases, or injuries while serving in the British Armed Forces, the Merchant Navy, the armed forces of the Dominions, the women's services, and the nursing services, together with all members of Scottish regiments. The Rolls of Honour include those who died between 4 August 1914 and 31 August 1921 as having died in the First World War and those between 3 September 1939 and 31 December 1947 as having died in the Second World War. Those not serving in the Scottish regiments must either have been born in Scotland or have at least one parent born in the country.

The memorial rolls list close to 135,000 casualties of the First World War and over 50,000 of the Second World War. More casualties from later wars are also inscribed, including from the Malayan Emergency, the Korean War (1950–1953), Operation Banner (1969–2007) during The Troubles, the Falklands War (1982), and the Gulf War (1990–1991). Most recently casualties from Iraq and Afghanistan have been added to the Rolls of Honour.

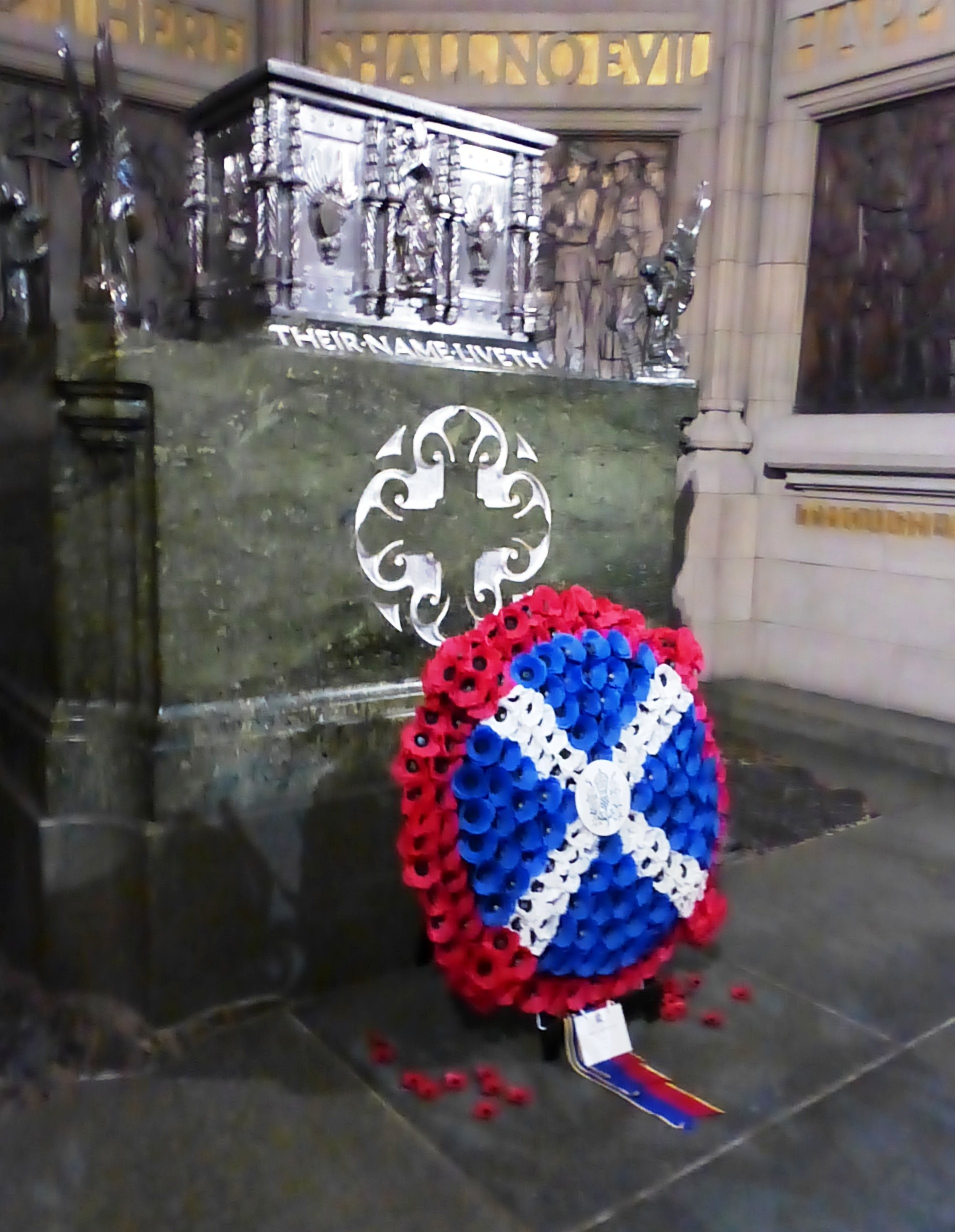
The steel casket containing the original Rolls of Honour with over 147,000 names, installed at the opening ceremony in 1927. It was a gift from the King and Queen

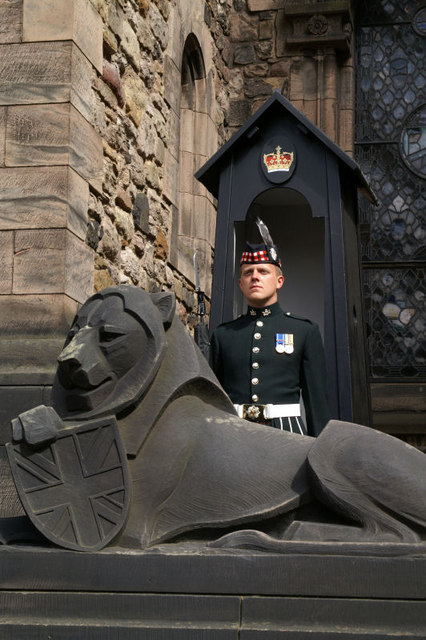
Sentry in a sentry box and the heraldic lion from the royal arms with its Union Jack shield by Phyllis Bone

== Development ==
Proposals for a Scottish National War Memorial were put forward in 1917, during the First World War, by John Stewart-Murray, 8th Duke of Atholl, and Captain George Swinton of Kimmerghame. Sir Robert Lorimer, the architect of the Order of the Thistle's Thistle Chapel in St Giles' Cathedral and one of the architects involved in the Imperial War Graves Commission, was appointed in 1919, but opposition to a large-scale monument arose from the Cockburn Association and others concerned with the castle's heritage. A more modest scheme to remodel the North Barrack Block was finally agreed in 1923, and the memorial was formally opened on 14 July 1927 by the Prince of Wales (later Edward VIII). After the Second World War, 50,000 names were added to the rolls of honour. Names continue to be added from successive conflicts, though the memorial itself has been left unchanged.

== The Memorial ==
The exterior of the building is decorated with gargoyles and sculpture by Pilkington Jackson, John Marshall and Phyllis Bone, whilst the interior contains elaborate wall monuments commemorating individual regiments. The stained-glass windows are by Douglas Strachan. The original aim behind the Memorial was to commemorate Scots and those serving with Scottish regiments who had died in the First World War, from the declaration of war on 4 August 1914 to the Treaty of Versailles of 28 June 1919 (confirmed military suicides and those tried and executed excepted). Upon the altar within the Shrine, placed on the highest part of the Castle Rock emerging through the floor, stands a sealed casket containing the Rolls of Honour listing over 147,000 names of those soldiers killed in the First World War together with open lists within the Hall. After the Second World War the limiting dates were modified, with another 50,000 names inscribed on the Rolls of Honour within the Hall, and with further names continuing to be added there. The memorial is maintained by a charitable trust known as the Scottish National War Memorial.

== Gallery ==
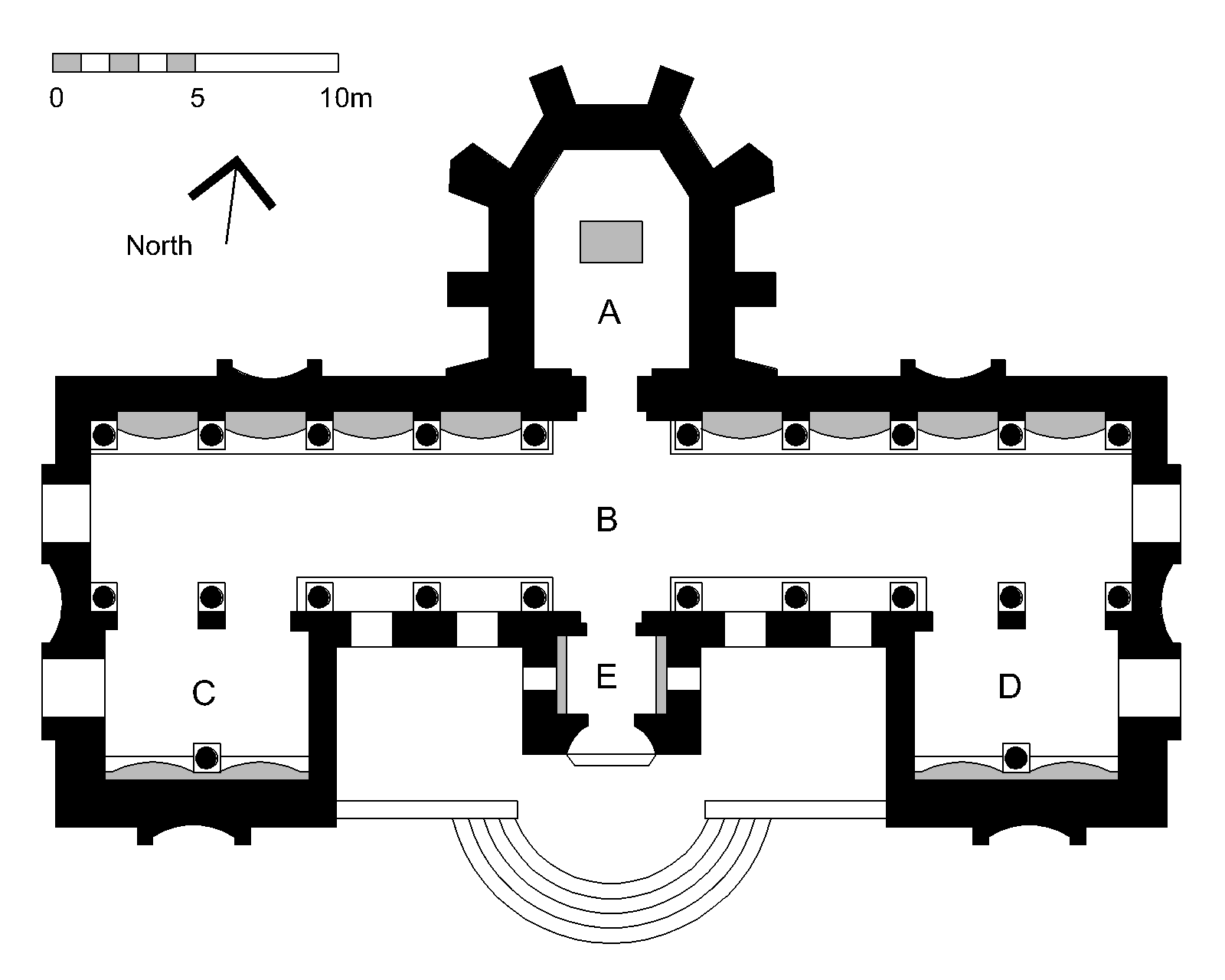
Plan

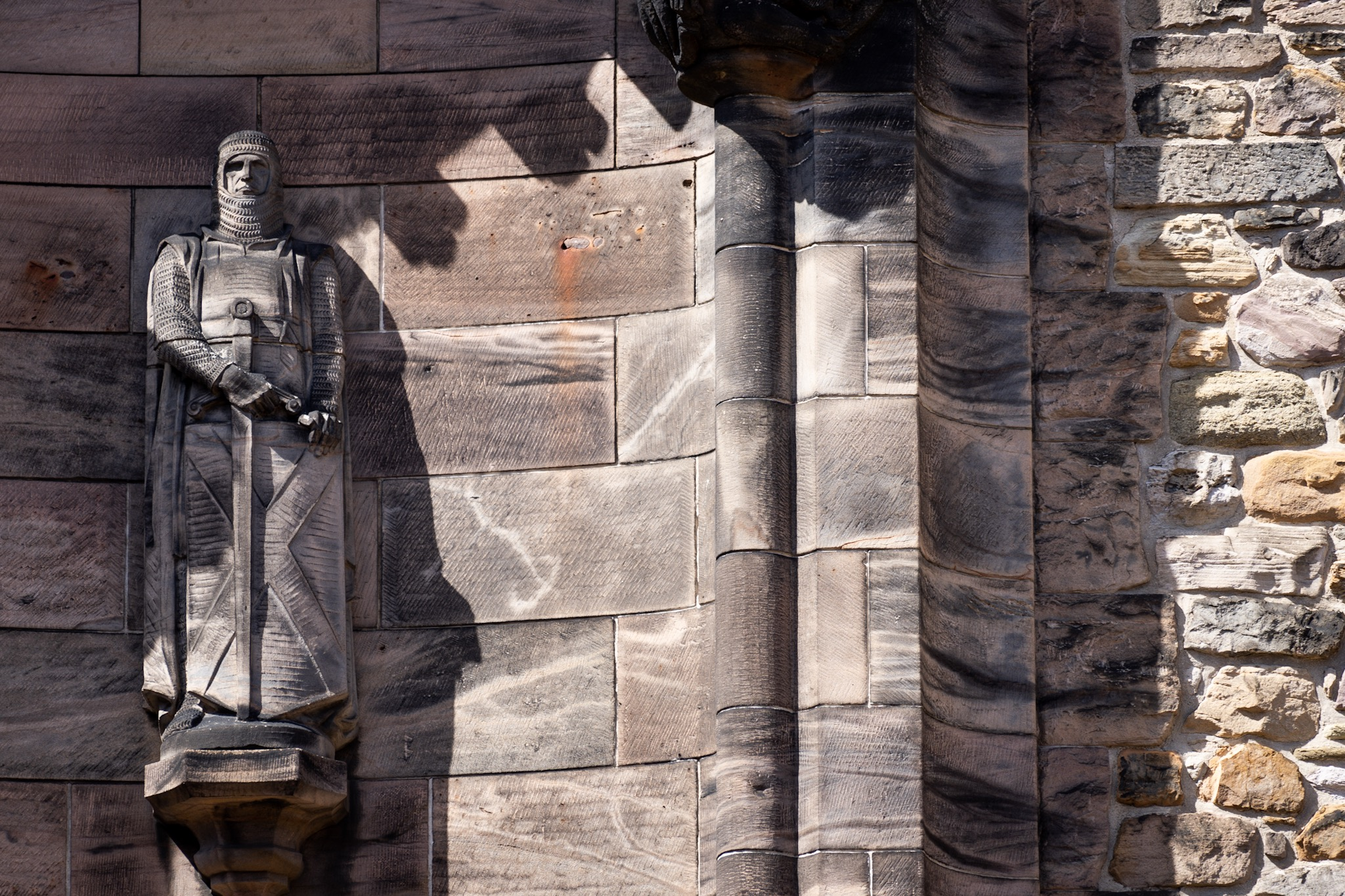
'Courage' by Alexander Carrick

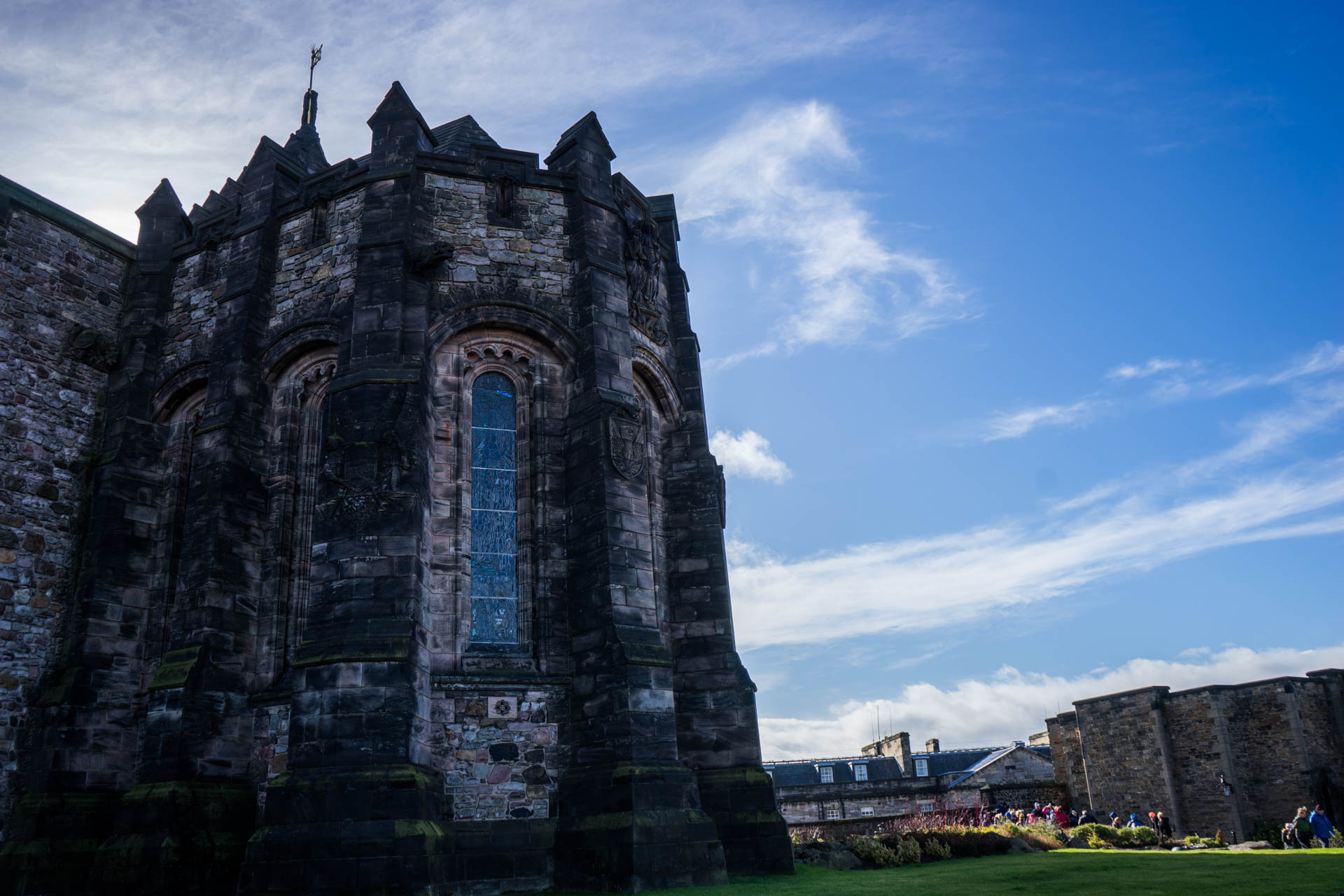
The apse

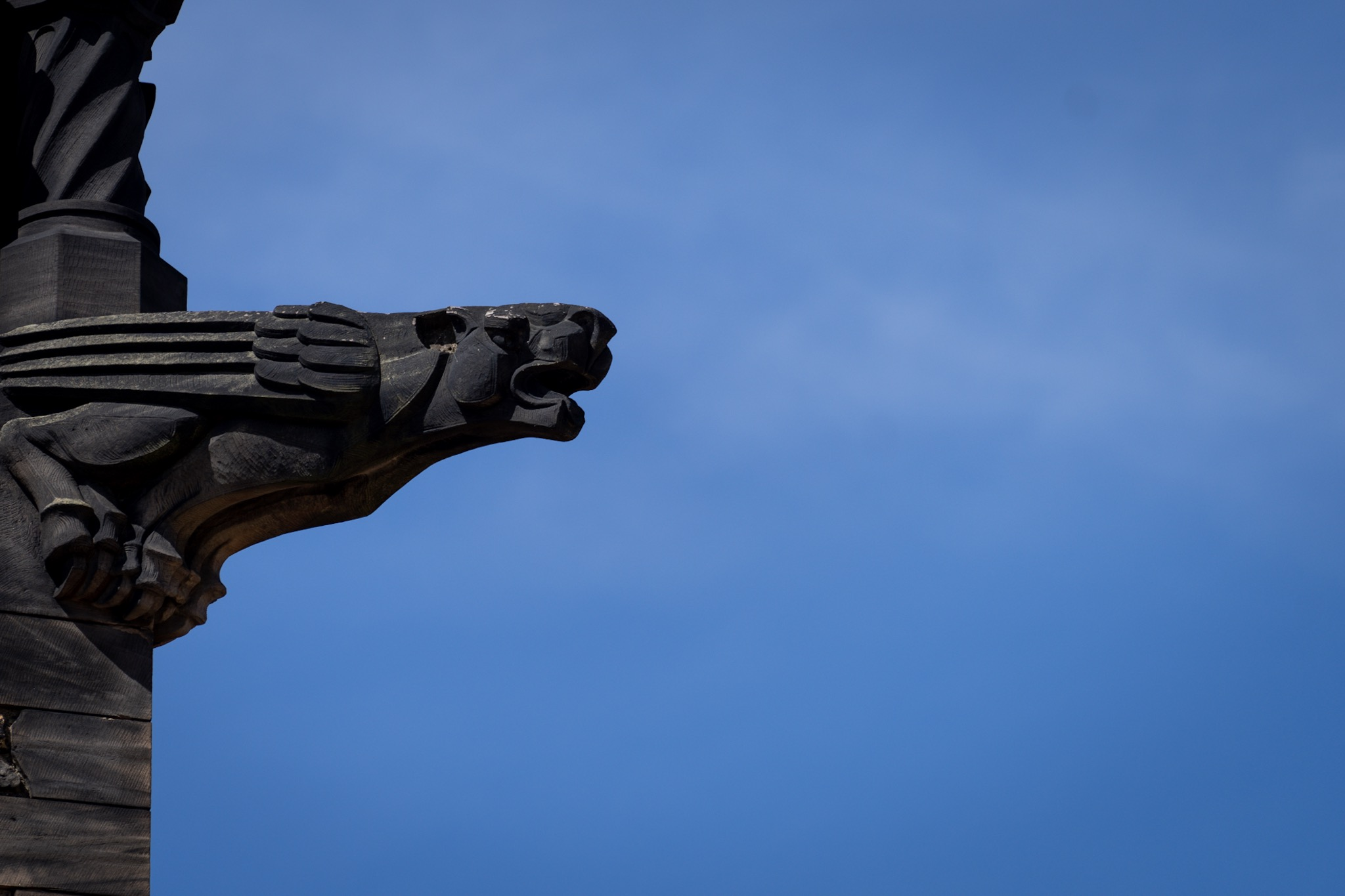
Gargoyle

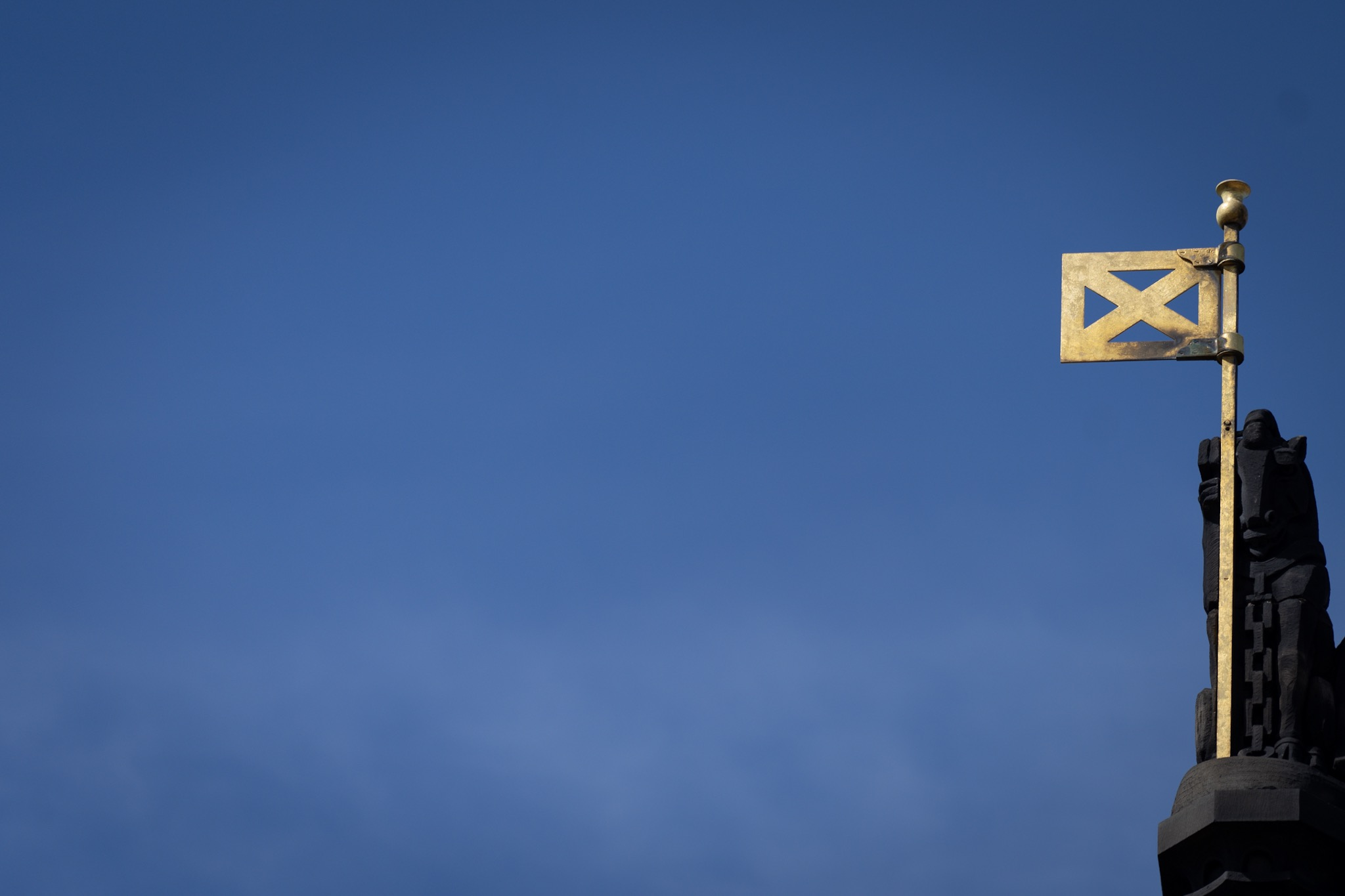
Heraldic unicorn with a St Andrew's cross flag and a thistle finial

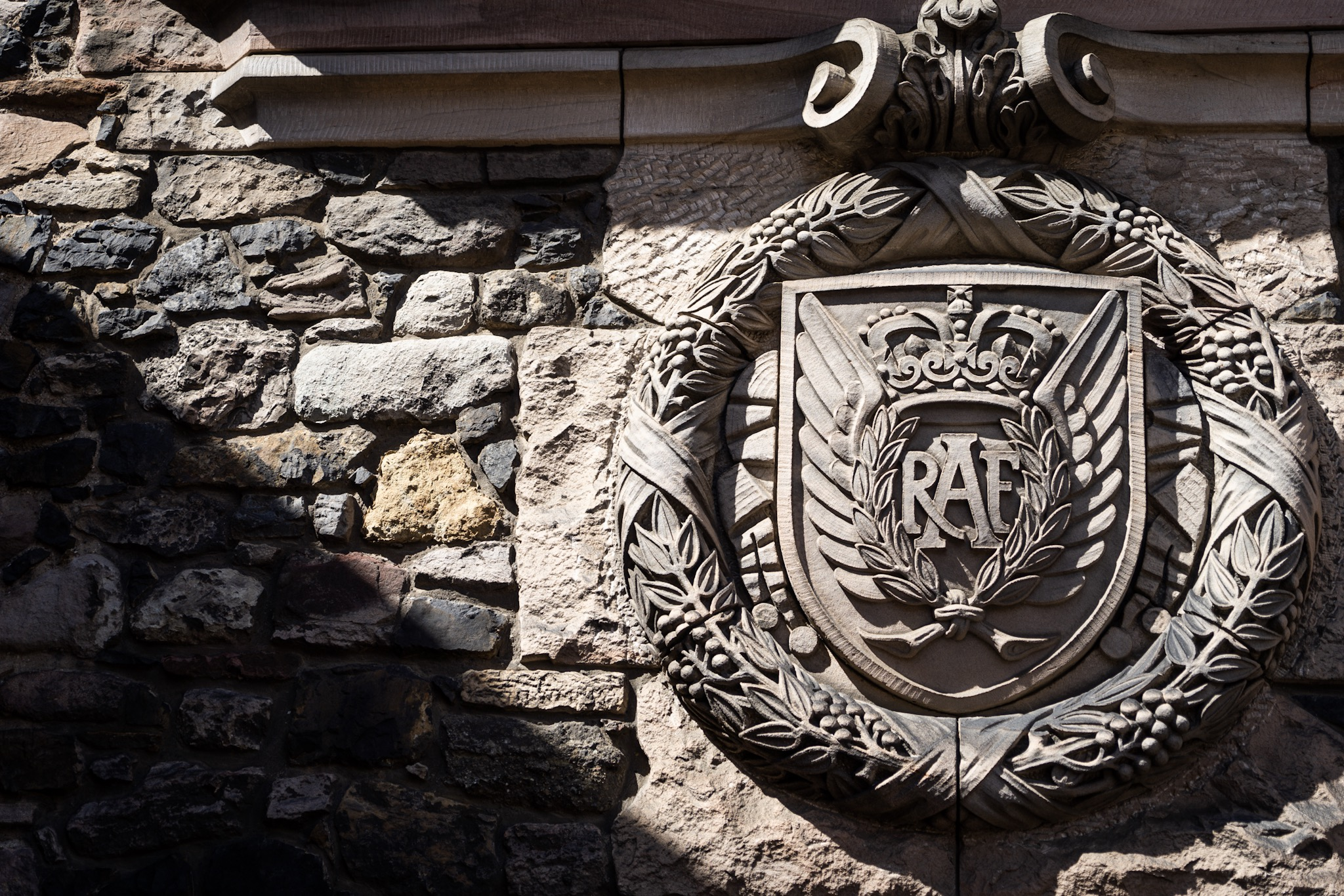
Memorial to the Royal Air Force in a laurel wreath by Pilkington Jackson

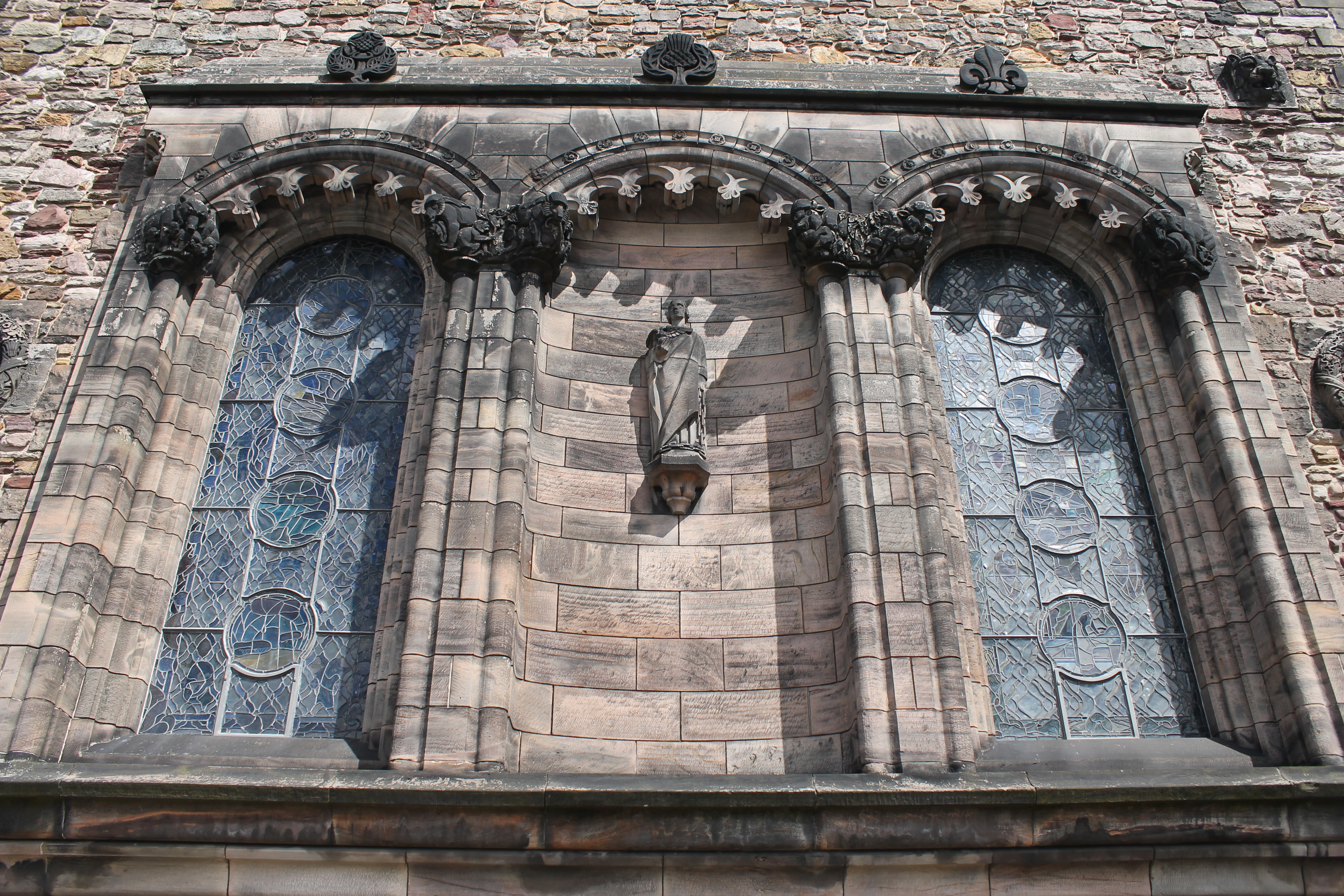
The western façade with 'Freedom' by Percy Portsmouth and niche capitals Phyllis Bone

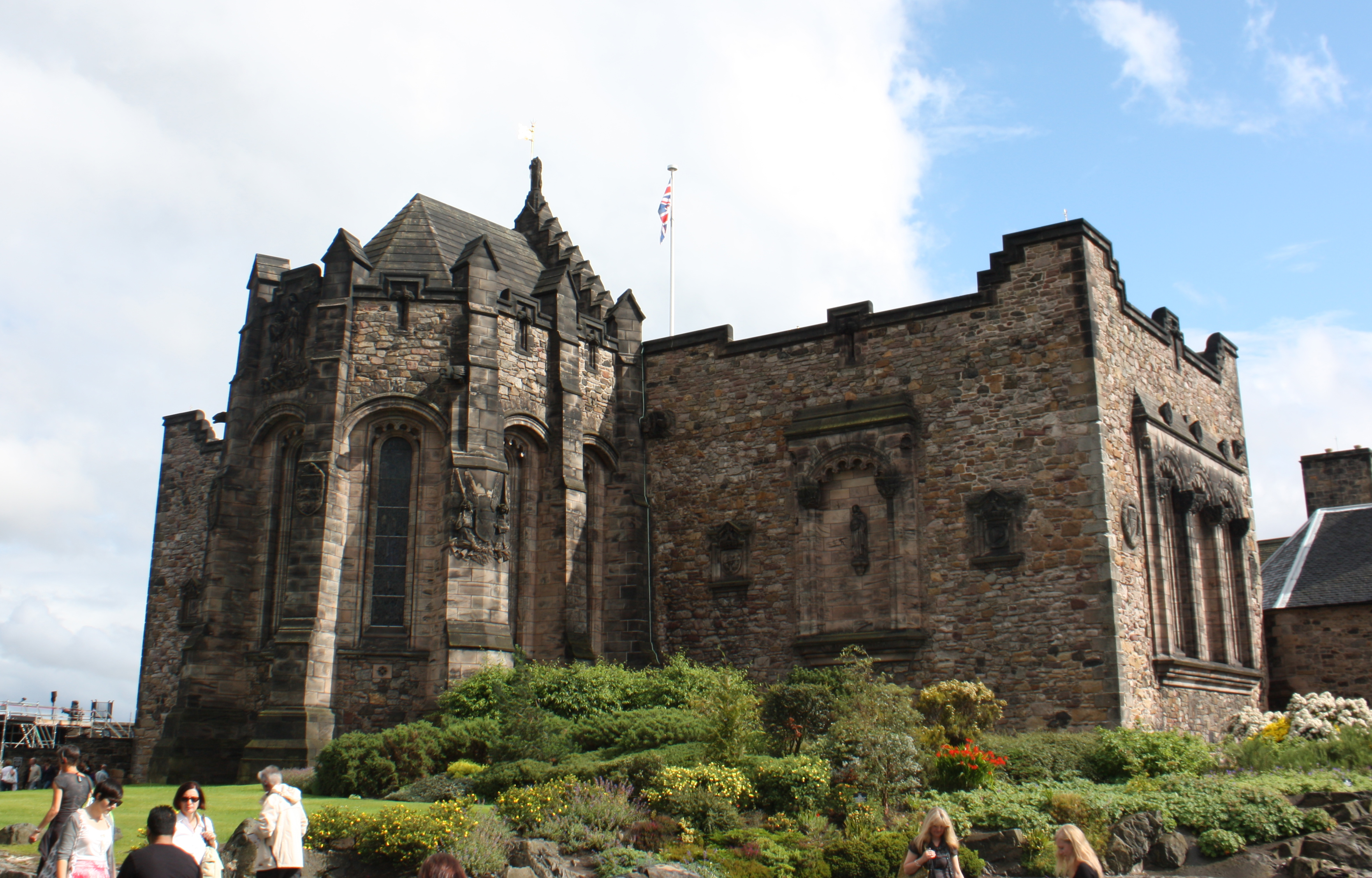
Scottish National War Memorial from the north, showing the shrine. The niche statue is 'Truth' by Alice Meredith-Williams and niche capitals by Phyllis Bone.

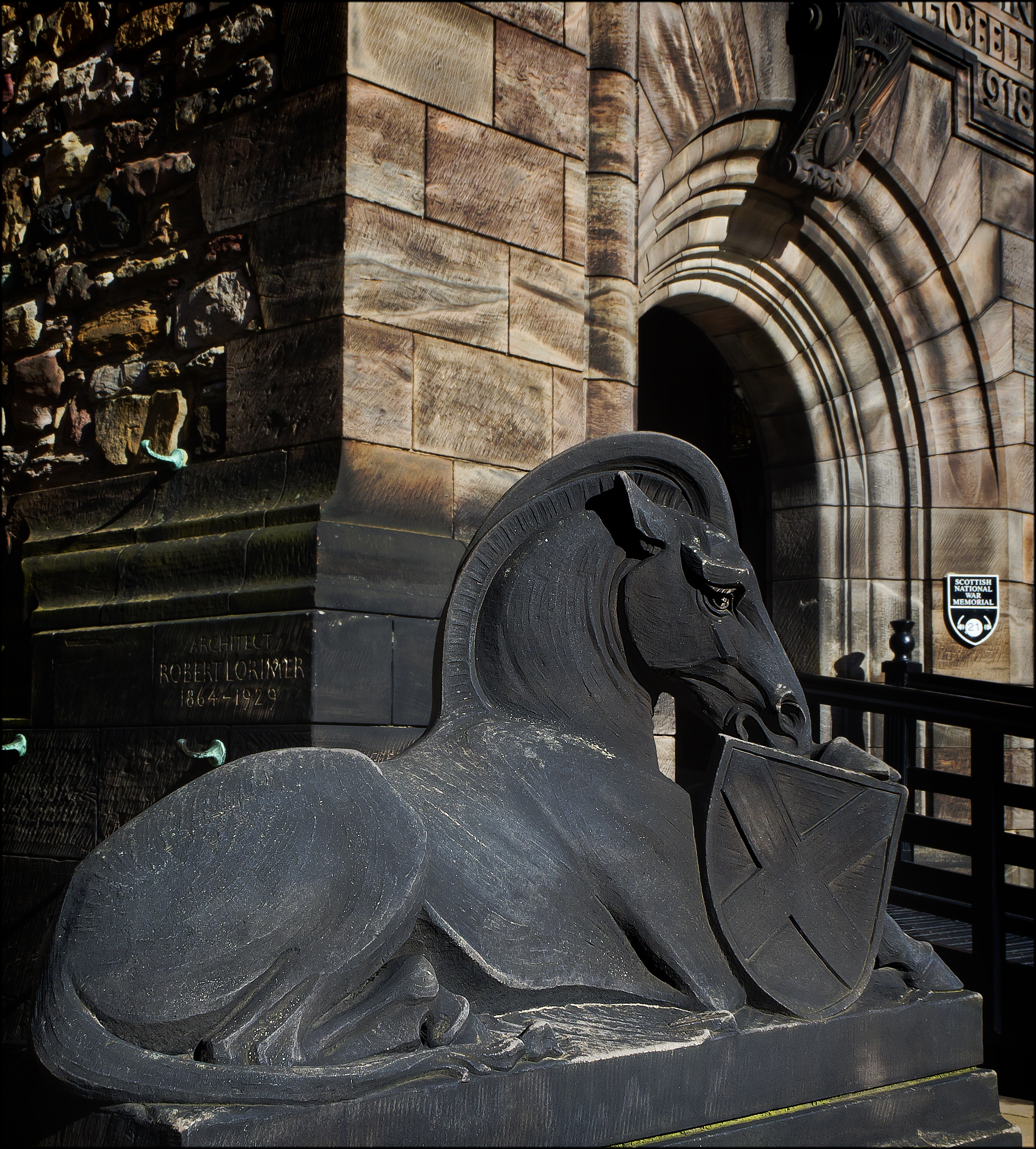
Unicorn from the royal arms, with a shield bearing a St Andrew's cross by Phyllis Bone

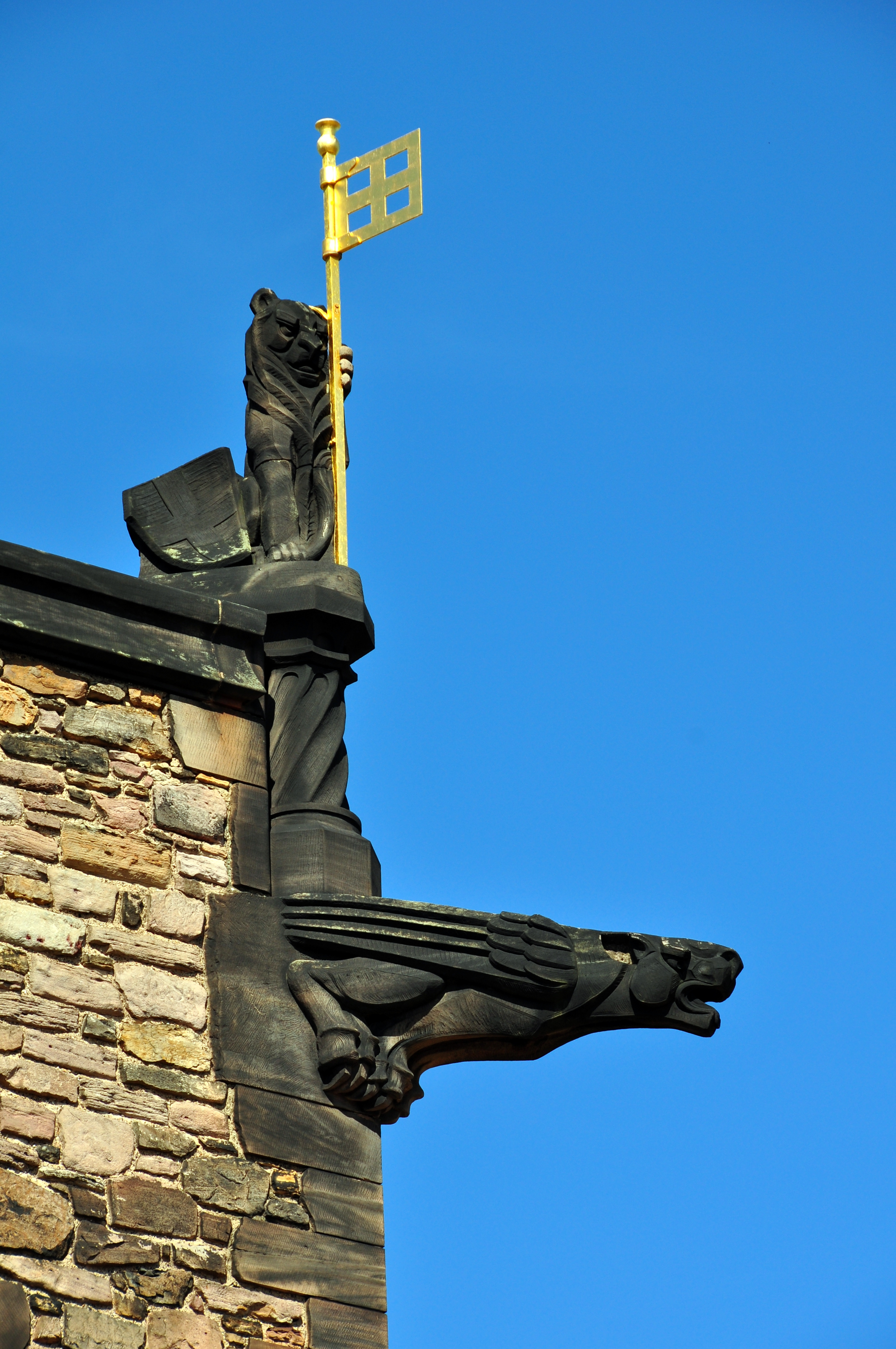
Gargoyle and the lion with the flag of England from the royal arms

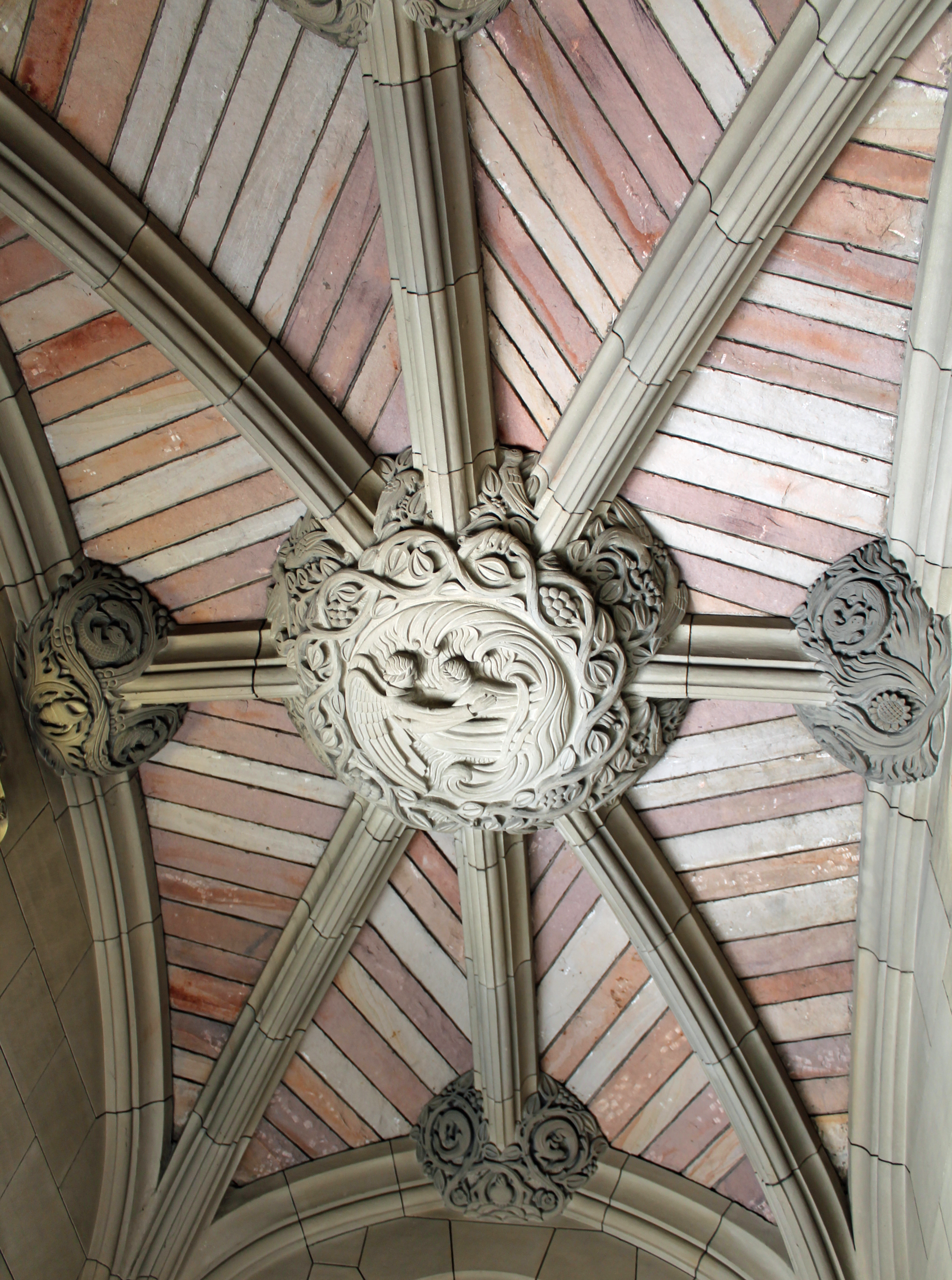
Rib vaulting

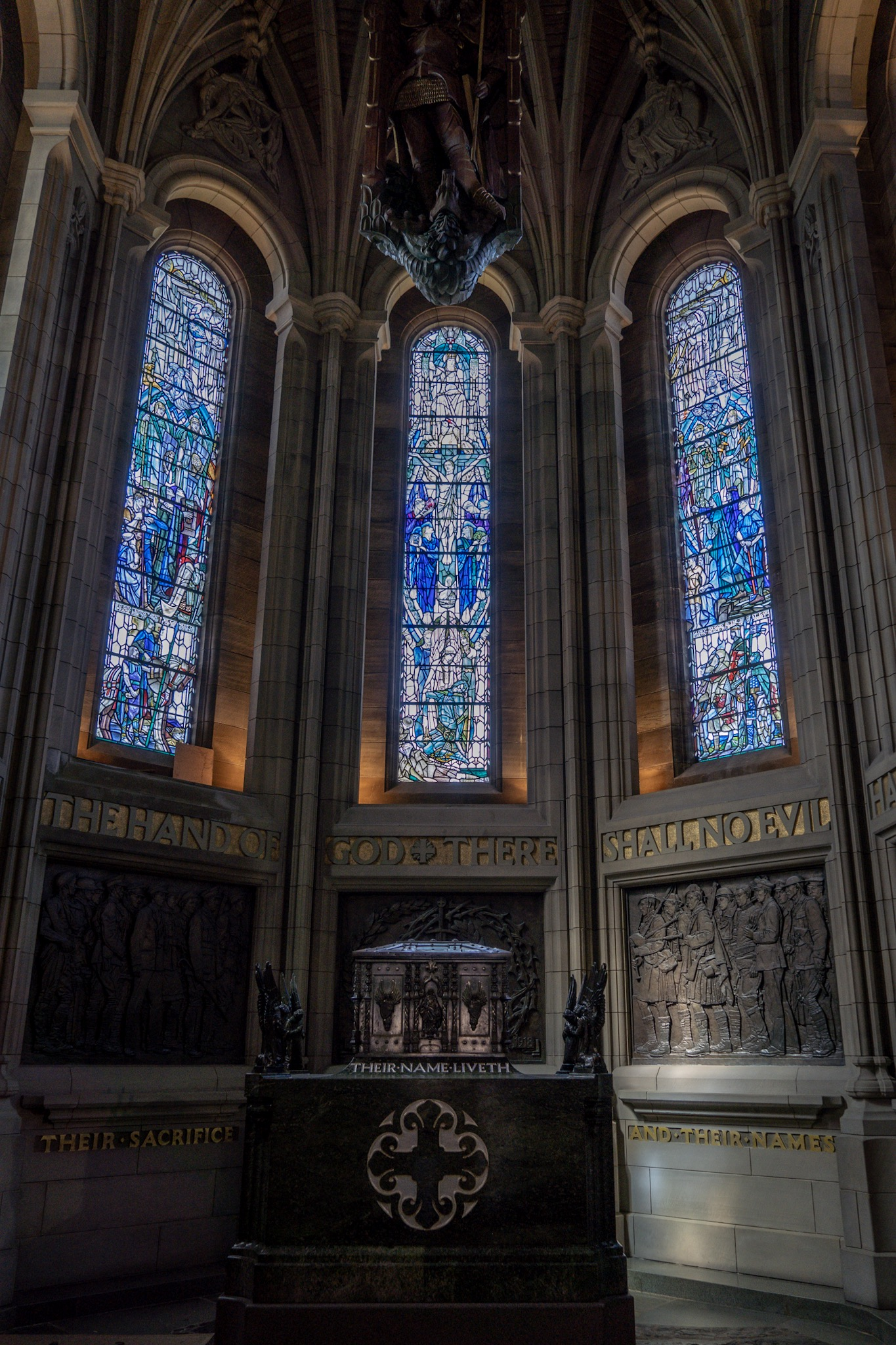
The apse interior

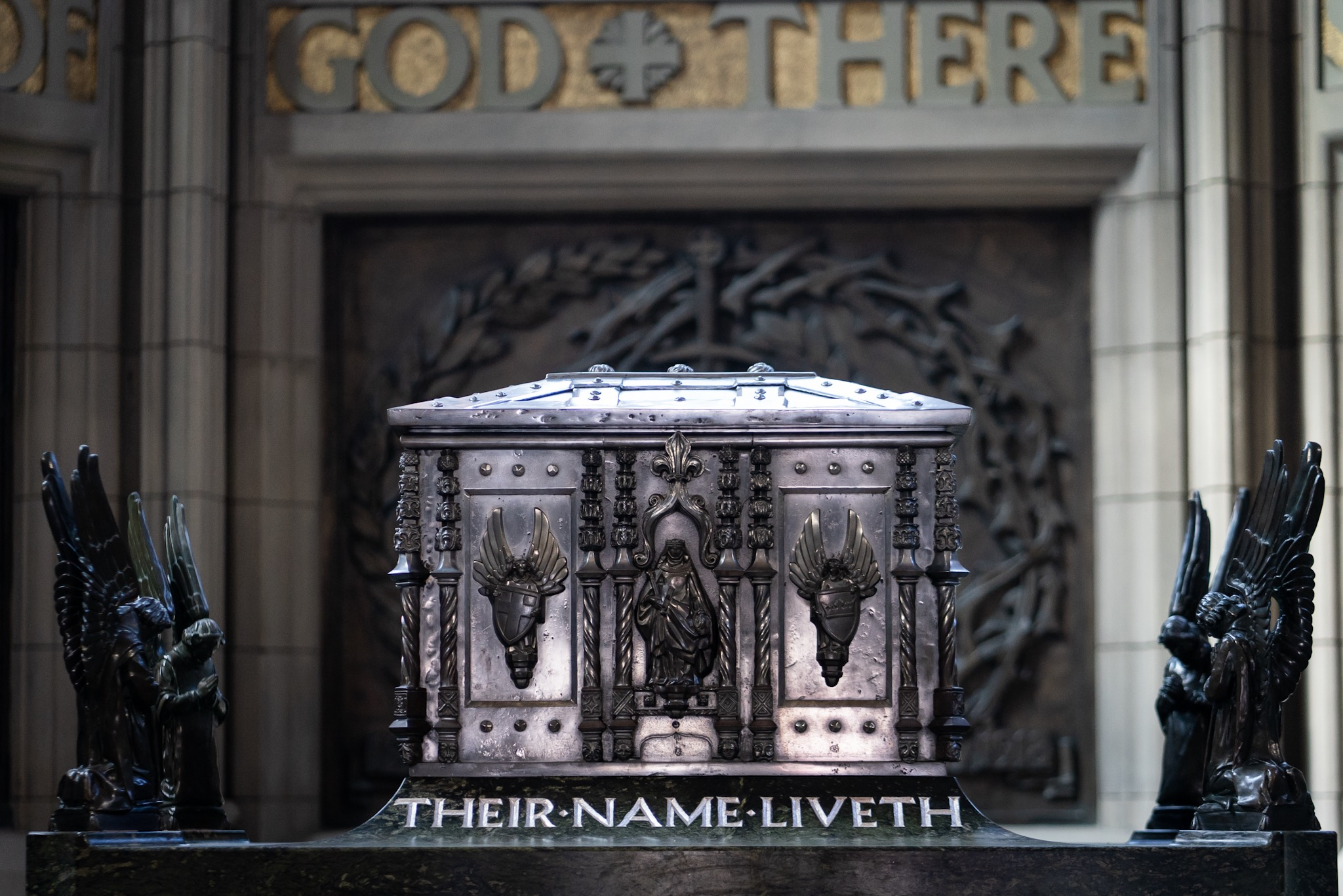
"Their name liveth for evermore"

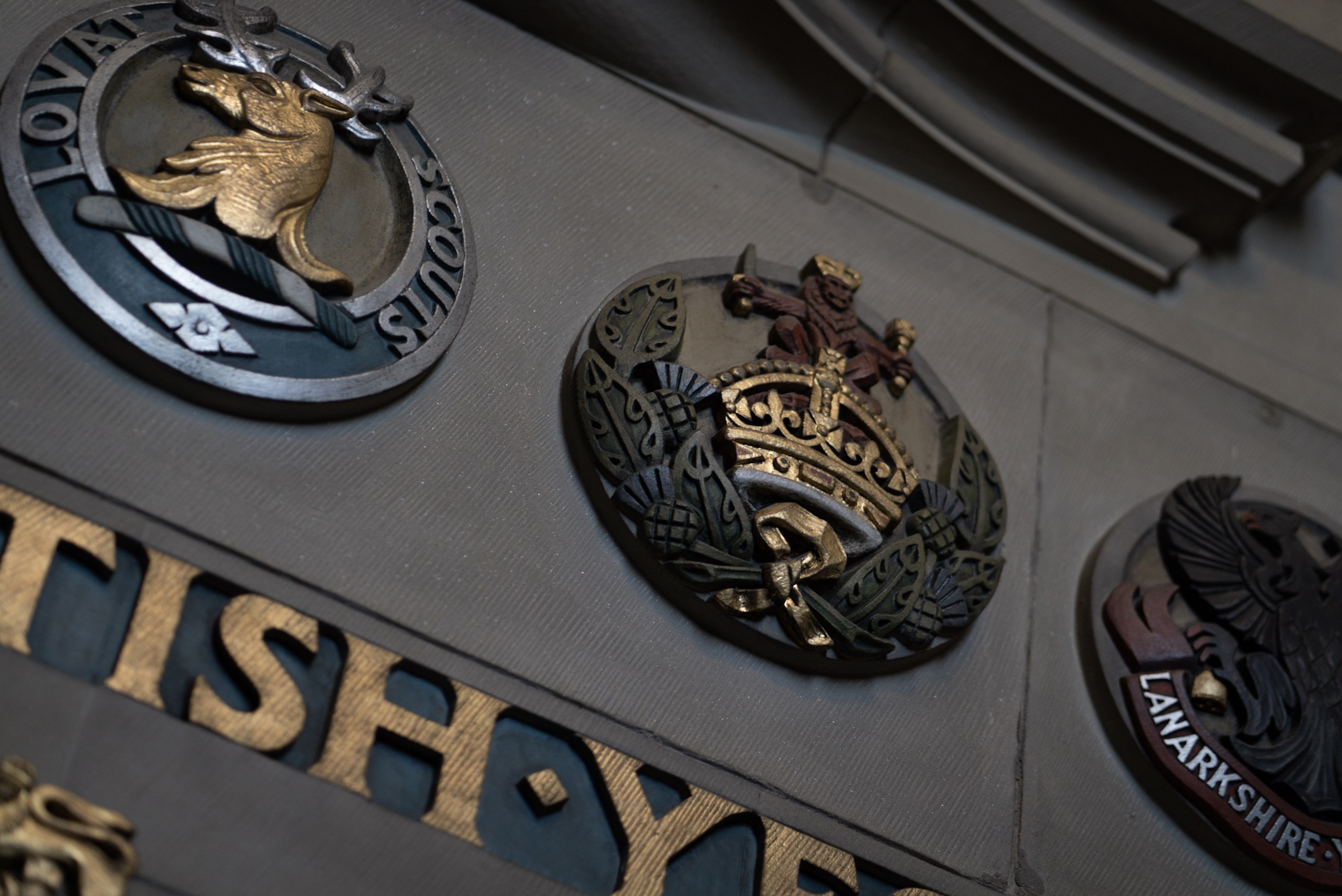
Military badge of the Lovat Scouts and the crest from the royal arms

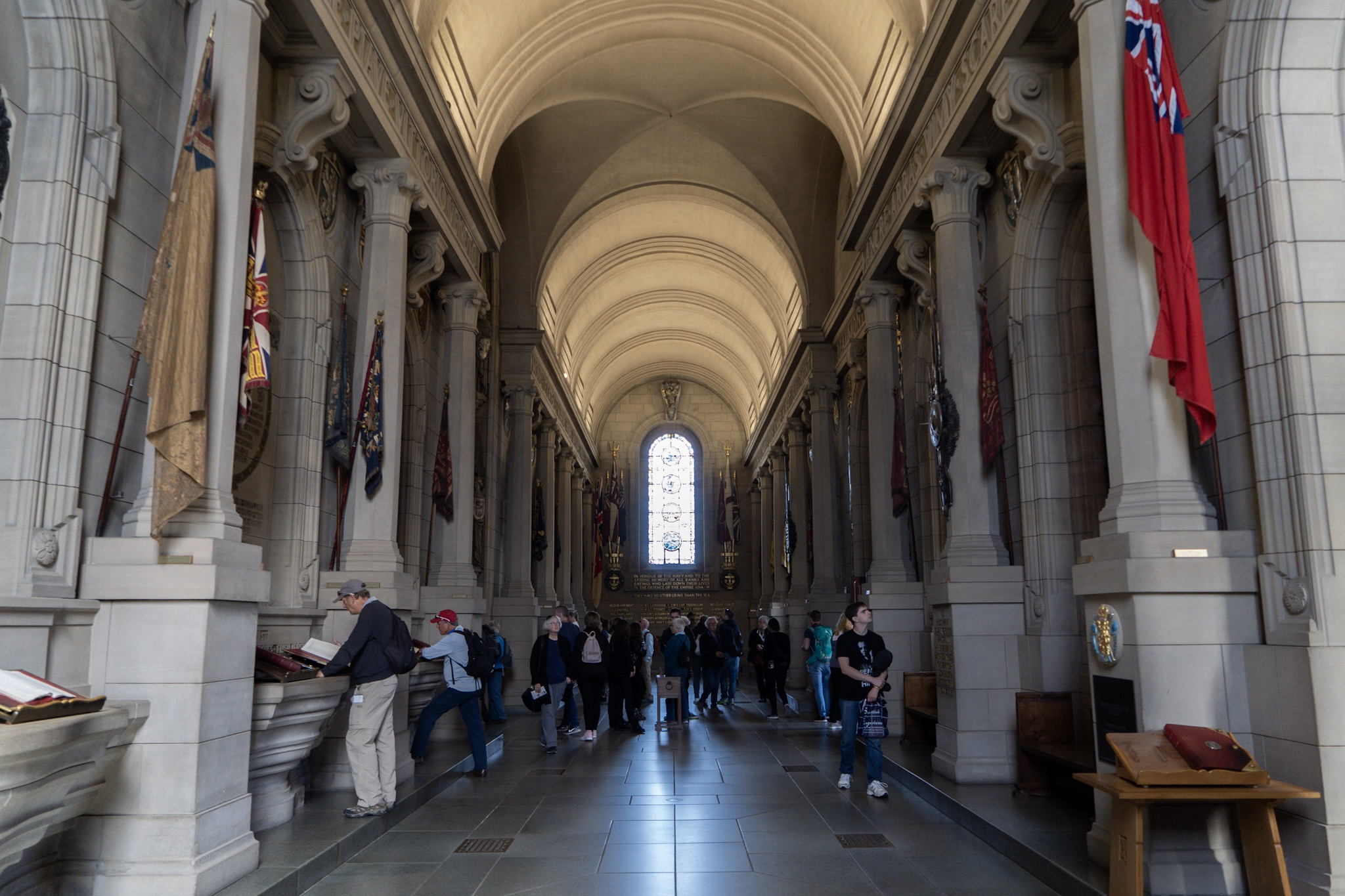
Hall with naval ensigns and military colours

== Sources ==
- McWilliam, Colin; Gifford, John; Walker, David (1984). Edinburgh. The Buildings of Scotland. Penguin. ISBN 9780140710687.
