= Thistle Chapel =

Chapel in Edinburgh, Scotland

Coordinates: 55°56′58″N 3°11′26″W

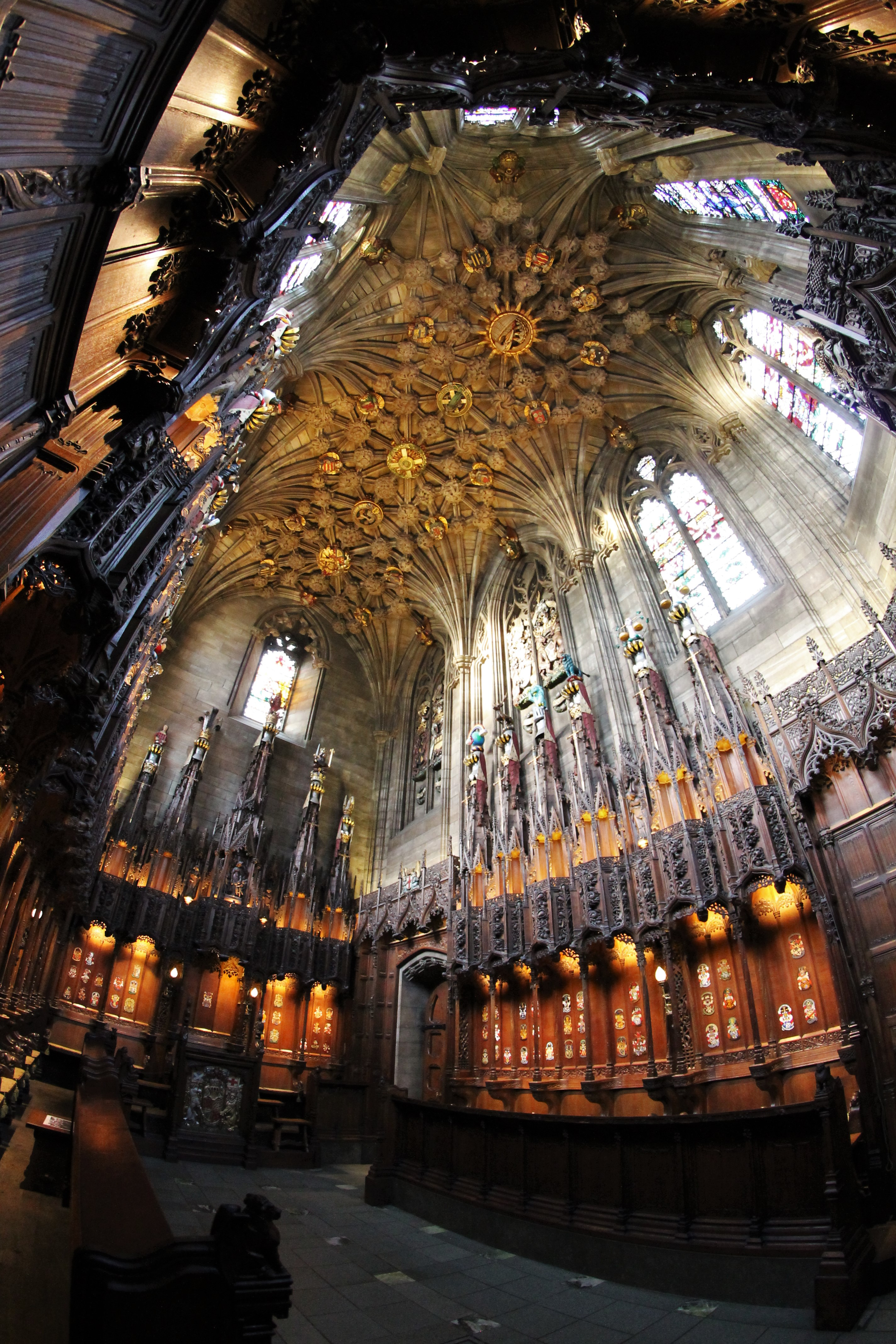
The interior of the Thistle Chapel, looking west

The Thistle Chapel, located in St Giles' Cathedral, Edinburgh, Scotland, is the chapel of the Order of the Thistle.

At the foundation of the Order of the Thistle in 1687, King James VII ordered Holyrood Abbey be fitted out as a chapel for the Knights. At James's deposition the following year, a mob destroyed the chapel's interior before the Knights ever met there. In the 19th and early 20th centuries, multiple proposals were made either to refurbish Holyrood Abbey for the Order of the Thistle or to create a chapel within St Giles' Cathedral. In 1906, after the sons of the 11th Earl of Leven donated £24,000 from their late father's estate, King Edward VII ordered a new Chapel to be constructed on the south side of St Giles's.

The Trustees appointed by the King to oversee the chapel's construction appointed Robert Lorimer as architect. The Trustees insisted the choice of craftspeople should reflect the national character of the chapel. Lorimer assembled a team of leading figures in the Scottish Arts and Crafts movement, including Phoebe Anna Traquair for enamelwork, Douglas Strachan for stained glass, Joseph Hayes for ornate stonework (and much of the woodwork), and the brothers William and Alexander Clow for other woodwork. Louis Davis – who supplied stained glass – and the Bromsgrove Guild – who supplied bronze fittings – were the only major contributors based outside Scotland. Construction began in November 1909 and the chapel was completed a little over a year later. After its official opening in July 1911, King George V knighted Lorimer for his work. Through the continuing addition of stall plates, crests, and banners for new Knights, the chapel's tradition of craftsmanship persists to the present day. The Knights of the Thistle meet in the Chapel at least once a year.

Architectural critics have noted Lorimer's successful use of a limited site to create a soaring work of Gothic architecture, rich with architectural details. A number of critics have emphasised the chapel's importance as a product of the Arts and Crafts movement, in which the collaborative craftsmanship of individual artisans defines the overall effect. Some critics have also emphasised the chapel's political role as an expression of Scottish patriotism, British imperialism, and monarchism.

== History ==
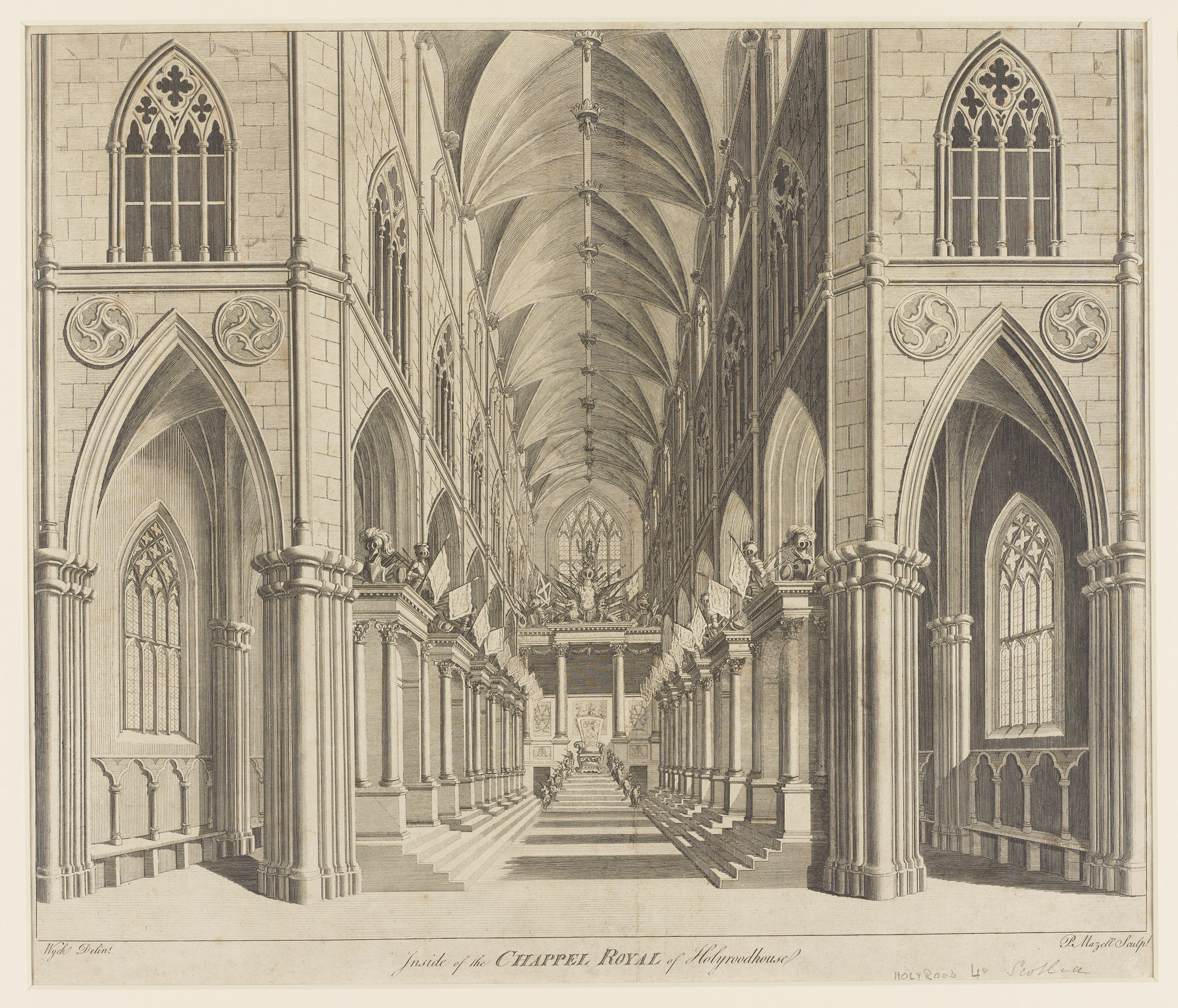
The interior of Holyrood Abbey as the chapel of the Order of the Thistle

=== Holyrood Abbey ===
On 29 May 1687, James VII founded the Order of the Thistle and issued a warrant to designate Holyrood Abbey the chapel of the new order. This change of purpose necessitated the eventual removal of the Abbey's Church of Scotland congregation to the Canongate Kirk.

In the seventeen months after the publication of the warrant, William Bruce oversaw the transformation of the Abbey: an altar and black and white marble floor were added and classical stalls were shipped from London. The Order of the Thistle never met in its new chapel: on 10 December 1688, in the wake of James' deposition, a mob from Edinburgh destroyed the furnishings.

=== Proposals for a new chapel ===
Although the order was revived in 1703 by Queen Anne, no chapel was designated. In 1728, the antiquarian William Douglas suggested the ruins of St Rule's Church in the grounds of St Andrews Cathedral be restored as a chapel for the order. Proposals to locate the chapel of the Order in St Giles' go back to 1872, when Secretary of the Order corresponded with the committee for the then-ongoing restoration of the church. In 1879 and 1882, Lindsay Mackersy, session clerk of the High Kirk, and the kirk session proposed the south transept of St Giles' as a chapel for the Order. None of these proposals proved practical.

In 1836, James Gillespie Graham and Augustus Pugin had drawn up plans to restore Holyrood Abbey as the chapel of the Order. Although Graham and Pugin's plans were not acted upon at the time, the same ambition was advanced in 1905, when Ronald Leslie-Melville, 11th Earl of Leven set up a fund of £40,000 to restore Holyrood Abbey for the Order of the Thistle. On investigation by Thomas Ross, the restoration of Holyrood Abbey was found to be impossible.

=== Construction ===
Upon the Earl's death in 1906, the fund reverted to his sons, who offered £22,000 and an endowment of £2,000 to construct a new chapel. Edward VII appointed William Montagu Douglas Scott, 6th Duke of Buccleuch; Archibald Primrose, 5th Earl of Rosebery; John David Melville, 12th Earl of Leven; and Schomberg Kerr McDonnell as trustees with Thomas Ross as architectural consultant. The King instructed to the Trustees to write to the kirk session of St. Giles' with the suggestion that a new chapel for the Order be housed in the cathedral; on 12 March 1909, the Cathedral authorities gratefully accepted this offer. The Trustees appointed Robert Lorimer as architect. The King approved Lorimer's plans and the first building contract was signed on 24 August 1909 with the foundation stone being laid on 6 November that year. The sculptor appointed by Lorimer to execute the elaborate carving was Joseph Hayes.

The chapel was completed by the autumn of 1910 in time for the first St Andrew's Day gathering of the Knights. The chapel was formally opened amidst much ceremony on 19 July 1911 by George V. At the opening, police hid in the boiler room beneath the chapel to guard against the threat of vandalism by suffragettes. At the end of the ceremony, the King received the chapel's craftspeople and Lorimer was shortly afterwards knighted for his work.

The Trustees insisted that "the Thistle Chapel is a national thing" and that, as such, preference should be shown to Scottish artisans. In line with the Arts and Crafts movement's emphasis on craftsmanship and collaboration, Lorimer had already assembled a largely Edinburgh-based team of artisans. Of the major contributors to the chapel, only Louis Davis – who designed the heraldic stained glass – and the Bromsgrove Guild – who supplied decorative metalwork – were based outside Scotland. The speed with which the chapel was completed is, in large part, due to the skill of this team of craftspeople.

=== Subsequent history ===
The former boiler room in the undercroft of the chapel was redeveloped in 1982 by Bernard Feilden and Simpson & Brown. Between 1987 and 2019, a cafe occupied the space immediately below the chapel.

Over four months in 2006, a major cleaning and preservation operation was undertaken by the firm of Charles Taylor: this was the first thorough maintenance project in the chapel's history.

The Thistle Chapel was temporarily closed to visitors from February 2015 after a number of valuable items were stolen. The Chapel re-opened to visitors the following year.

== Architecture ==
The Thistle Chapel is simple in form: the Chapel itself consists of three bays and an apsidal east end with neither aisles nor transepts. Beneath the chapel is an undercroft and adjoining the chapel is the ante-chapel with arches opening into the Preston Aisle and south choir aisle of the cathedral and an external east door and steps providing access to Parliament Square.

The chapel sits in a constrained site: on the edge of St Giles' Cathedral at its north and west and constricted by Parliament Square to its south and east; the kirk session of St Giles' Cathedral also required the chapel should not interfere with services in the cathedral or block light from the church. To create an impression of grandeur, Lorimer designed the chapel to be unusually tall: the interior of the chapel, while only 5.5 meters (18 feet) wide and 11.5 meters (36 feet) long, is 13 meters (42 feet) tall.

At the time of the commission, Robert Lorimer, a former pupil of Robert Rowand Anderson and George Frederick Bodley, was roughly half-way through his architectural career; though his only major ecclesiastical commission had been St Peter's Roman Catholic Church, Morningside. John Fraser Matthew, Lorimer's future partner, assisted Lorimer in the design of the chapel. Lorimer's design takes inspiration from late 15th century Gothic architecture and, in its form and in its use of curvilinear tracery, displays the influence of George Frederick Bodley.

The chapel is constructed of sandstone from Cullalo in Fife. The same stone was employed by William Burn as ashlar to face the exterior of St Giles' during the restoration of 1829–33 and by Robert Reid for the construction of the Law Courts on the opposite side of Parliament Square. The exterior of the Thistle Chapel therefore appears consistent with St Giles' while complementing other buildings on Parliament Square. Christopher Hussey argued Lorimer was successful in creating a chapel that "harmonises perfectly with the Cathedral structure as a whole, but fearlessly proclaims its individuality."

=== Exterior ===
On its exterior, the chapel's base is emphasised by multiple horizontal moulded courses, from which rise gableted buttresses; the buttresses terminate at the cornice of the castellated parapet. The parapet conceals the flat, asphalt-covered concrete roof. According to Christopher Hussey, the "pronounced batter of the buttresses" creates "an illusion of height and massiveness without".

The buttresses divide the exterior into bays: between each bay, the plinth, pierced by dormer-like ventilation holes (now glazed), slopes steeply to a sheer wall surface below a traceried lancet window. This sloping plinth was likely inspired by chapels at the east end of Chartres Cathedral. On the cornice above each window, a demi-angel bears a shield while below each window is the escutcheon and coronet of each Knight at the time of Chapel's construction corresponding to the arms depicted in the window. The curvilinear tracery of these windows evokes the surviving medieval tracery of St Giles'. At the east end, the parapet rises to accommodate a canopied niche, in which stands a statue of Saint Andrew.

At the west end, an octagonal turret, capped with a spirelet, stands in the south corner: this contains a spiral staircase, which leads to the roof. The west window is in the form of an oriel and the west gable is crow-stepped.

Between the south wall of Saint Giles and the north side of the chapel, a wide flight of steps rises to the east door, which leads to the ante-chapel. The round-arched doorway dates to the 15th century and originally stood at the south entrance to St Giles'. At the restoration of 1829–1833, William Burn reincorporated the doorway as part of an internal partition wall. When the cathedral's partition walls were demolished during the restoration of 1871–1883, William Hay reconstructed the door at the royal entrance at the east end of the church. The royal entrance was constructed during the Burn restoration and consisted of a chamber accessed by a flight of steps. During the construction of the Thistle Chapel, the royal entrance was demolished and replaced by the ante-chapel while the doorway was retained and reincorporated as the entrance to the ante-chapel. Above the door rests a heavy heraldic frieze under an uninterrupted parapet.

=== Interior ===
==== Ante-chapel ====
The ante-chapel is 7.6 meters (25 feet) long and 4.3 meters (14 feet) wide; it consists of two bays: in the west end and north west bay stand arches opening into St Giles' Cathedral, the external doorway occupies the eastern wall, and in the south west bay, a cusped Tudor arch with angels on the cusps frames both the off-centre door to the chapel and an inscription and heraldic relief in memory of Ronald Leslie-Melville, 11th Earl of Leven. On the walls of the two eastern bays are inscribed the names of the Sovereigns and Knights from the foundation of the order in 1687 to the construction of the Chapel in 1909. Around the east door stands an interior glass porch added in 1983 by Simpson and Brown.

The ceiling of the ante-chapel consists of a shallow lierne vault, heavy with foliate bosses; the central bosses depict Saint Andrew and the Lion Rampant. There are 57 bosses and over 70 tons of stone in the ante-chapel ceiling.

The preconditions for the design of the Chapel required the ante-chapel to be low in order to prevent the obstruction of light from the windows of the cathedral. Lorimer took advantage of this requirement by creating a close, sombre ante-chapel to emphasise, by contrast, the soaring proportions of the chapel.

==== Chapel ====
The interior of the Chapel consists of three bays, an apsidal east end and a flat west end. Above the line of the stalls rise pointed windows; the single-light east window is flanked by angels. At the west end, a single oriel is framed by a cusped lancet. In the north-west two bays blind tracery imitates the form of the windows and frames reliefs of the arms of the Duke of Argyll, the Duke of Montrose, the Earl of Crawford and Balcarres, and the Marquess of Tweeddale.

A shallow lierne-vaulted ceiling crowns the soaring interior of the chapel. While the ceiling's height contrasts with the ceiling of the ante-chapel, its design is similar with large bosses dominating the ceiling. At the key-stone of each bay rests a demi-angel playing a different musical instrument. These musical angels were likely inspired by similar examples at Melrose Abbey and Rosslyn Chapel. Between foliate bosses – many of which depict national flowers of the countries of the United Kingdom of Great Britain and Ireland – a stage of bosses take the form of angels bearing the escutcheons of the eight Knights at the time of the Order's foundation and the six Knights added by Queen Anne. The massive central bosses depict, from west to east, the Royal arms of Scotland, Saint Giles, the star of the Order of the Thistle, Saint Andrew, and the Pelican in her piety. Lorimer believed the art of vaulting reached its zenith in the Perpendicular period and designed the vault in that style; at the same time, he employed large, robust bosses to evoke Scottish medieval architecture. Likewise, Lorimer's preference for heraldic angels and foliate bosses may have been inspired by similar stonework in the adjoining Preston Aisle of St Giles'. There are 98 bosses and over 200 tons of sandstone in the Chapel ceiling; the larger bosses weigh over a ton each.

== Stonework ==
The contract for stonework went to A. Colville & Co., whose yard was at Haymarket. The carvings were done by Joseph Hayes – with whom Lorimer had already collaborated – and his men, initially overseen by the foreman Thomas Somerville, who died during the construction. Over 1000 tons of stone was sculpted at the yard then transported over a mile by horse and cart to St Giles', where some final work was done as the stones were put in place. Although Hayes and his men displayed independence in developing designs, Lorimer claimed ultimate authorship, insisting the masons "get their cue from him".

The most detailed carving was done by "the Greek", whose name is not otherwise known. Among the other members of Hayes' team was Alexander Carrick, who became a noted sculptor in his own right. Louis Deuchars created plaster models from which Hayes and his men worked. Heraldic devices were emblazoned by Alfred Nixon of Moxon & Carfare.

The floor of the chapel is Ailsa Craig granite with panels of Iona marble. This was laid by Allan & Sons of Piershill. On 4 July 1962, a memorial floor plaque to George VI, designed by Esmé Gordon, was unveiled by the Queen. The plaque was made by Stewart McGlashan & Sons of Canonmills and consists of a panel of granite with a bronze border and lettering; the Royal Arms of Scotland are formed by inlaid pieces of marble. In 1927, Pilkington Jackson carved the names of the Knights and Sovereigns of the Order of the Thistle from 1687 to 1909 in the walls of the ante-chapel.

== Woodwork ==
The contract for the oak interior woodwork was given to the company of Nathaniel Grieve of Washington Lane, Dalry. Grieve's workmen executed the wood panelling and foliate borders. The most detailed woodwork was carved by the New Town-based brothers, William and Alexander Clow, mostly from designs by Louis Deuchars. The Clow brothers worked almost exclusively for Lorimer.

Lorimer based the design of the Knights’ stalls on those at St George's Chapel, Windsor. Each stall is flanked by an animal on the arm-rest: some of these were based on animals that appear in the arms of the Knights and were carved by the Clow brothers from rough sketches by Lorimer. Each arm-rest bears a twisting pillar that support a canopy over the stall; on each of the cusps of these canopies is an angel with twin angels above the cusps of the Sovereign's stall, between the canopies are angels playing musical instruments. Deuchars designed each angel to be unique in appearance.

Above each canopy are three canopied niches. The niches of the Sovereign's stall contains sculptures of Saint Mungo, Saint Margaret of Scotland, and Saint Columba. Above the niches of each stall are tall, crocketed spires surmounted by the coronet, helm and crest of each Knight. A decorative sword stands in line with each spire: these were sculpted by Beveridge of Scott Morton & Co. and painted by Moxon & Carfrae.

The Sovereign's stall at the centre of the western end is especially intricate: its spire is 10 meters (33 feet) tall while the two stalls on either side of it – which are reserved for royal Knights – descend in height to the Knights’ stalls, which are 7.6 meters (25 feet) tall. The book rest in front of the Sovereign's stall bears a large panel with the full achievement of the Royal Arms of Scotland; on the ends are the escutcheons of Queen Anne and James VII. The dado of the apsidal east end is panelled and surmounted by a continuous canopy of ogee arches below a pierced parapet. The panelling of the central section above the holy table is the most detailed and contains a sculpture of an allegorical winged figure defeating a dragon which represents evil. This may represent Saint Margaret of Antioch.

Moxon & Carfrae of George Street painted and stained the wood; the company subsequently held the contract to maintain the woodwork.

=== Furniture ===
A number of pieces of free-standing wooden furniture were added at the time of the chapel's construction: these are the Dean's chair and book rest and the lectern and reader's seat. A credence table, designed by Lorimer and carved by Nathaniel Grieve, was added in 1920; this stands in the north alcove of the apse. The table was produced to coincide with Sir John Hatt Noble Graham's donation of a silver chalice and paten from the collection Ferdinand II of Portugal. Nathaniel Grieve also provided an attendant's seat and desk for the ante-chapel in 1927. Scott Morton & Co. provided eight oak stools in 1934.

As a memorial to George V, a communion table with a short retable was commissioned from Scott Morton & Co. and designed by John Fraser Matthew. The front of the table shows the Lamb of God and the retable bears emblems of each person of the Trinity. The table replaced the chair of investiture at the east end of the chapel. The unveiling of the table by George VI was intended for autumn 1939; however, the outbreak of the Second World War meant this was delayed until July 1943.

=== Crests ===
Atop the spire above each Knight's seat is a sculpted coronet and helm and the crest of the incumbent Knight. Whenever a Knight dies and another Knight is appointed in his/her place, the deceased Knight's crest is replaced with that of their successor.

Between the construction of the chapel and the firm's liquidation in 1966, the crests were carved by the foreman carver of Scott Morton & Co. of Edinburgh. Moxon & Crafrae originally coloured the crests but by the time of Scott Morton & Co.’s dissolution, this was done by A.C. Wood & Son. Whytock and Reid then held the contract to carve the crests until 1983; since then, the work has been done by John Donaldson of Livingston.

== Stained Glass ==
The Trustees encouraged Robert Lorimer to employ a Scottish artist for the Chapel’s stained glass; but Lorimer favoured the London-based stained glass designer, Louis Davis. As a compromise, Davis was commissioned to design seven windows to show the arms of the Knights at the time of the Chapel’s construction while the Scottish artist, Douglas Strachan, was commissioned to design the east window, depicting Saint Andrew.

Each heraldic window is split into two main lights by a central mullion with a coat of arms in each light. Lorimer insisted the arms be framed by clear glass to allow light into the Chapel. For the clear glass, Davis, in common with other stained glass artists of the Arts and Crafts movement, preferred imperfect ‘brown’ glass to entirely transparent ‘factory’ glass. In the top light of each window is a zodiac sign: these were designed by Davis’ frequent collaborator, Karl Parsons.

Going clockwise the north side, the arms depicted are as follows: the Marquess of Zetland and the Earl of Erroll; the Marquess of Aberdeen and Lord Hamilton of Dalzell; the Duke of Roxburghe and the Earl of Haddington; Lord Balfour of Burleigh and the Earl of Home; the Earl of Rosebery and the Duke of Fife; and the Duke of Buccleuch and the Duke of Atholl. The single-light west window, also by Davis, shows the Royal Arms of Scotland.

Strachan's single-light east window depicts Saint Andrew above the Royal Arms of Scotland and beneath two angles who bear his cross and martyr's crown. Unusually, Andrew is depicted in his career as a fisherman rather than at his martyrdom; as described by Elizabeth Cumming: “Strachan’s figure holds a natural pose, and presents Andrew as a rugged, working fisherman, his net firmly held in his arms”.

In 1982, small stained glass windows replaced the ventilation grilles in the former boiler room below the chapel; these were designed by Christian Shaw and depict the days of creation.

== Metalwork ==
The wrought-iron gates of the ante-chapel and the iron components of the chapel's doors were forged by Thomas Hadden and his workshop at Silvermills. Hadden based the design of the gates on medieval rood screens. Hadden had previously collaborated with Lorimer on Earlshall Castle and Ardkinglas.

Hadden's forge also contributed the bronze curtain rails at the east end and the helms atop each Knight's stall. The coronets below the helms were made by T.K. Ebbutt of Hanover Street in the New Town and painted by Moxon & Carfrae. Ebbutt also made ceremonial keys for the chapel, which show Saint Andrew on the bow.

Pendant electric lamps were produced by the Bromsgrove Guild and based on models by Louis Deuchars. These consist of angels bearing torches above a pendant showing the Pelican in her piety. During the remodelling of the east end in 1939, a new lamp was supplied by Charles Henshaw of Edinburgh. Over the years, the pendants went missing and one lamp was stolen; in 2006, Powderhall Bronze of Edinburgh manufactured replacements. The Bromsgrove Guild also produced the handles and keyhole escutcheon for the Chapel door.

Alongside the communion table unveiled in 1943, a silvered bronze cross was added at the east end. Designed by John Fraser Matthew, the cross features square enamelled panels at each end, showing the symbols of the Four Evangelists: these panels were designed by Morris Meredith Williams and enamelled by Harold Conrad William Soper of London. Architectural metalwork by other firms includes door locks and hinges by Low & Methven of Lothian Road and external lead piping by W. Dodds & Sons of West Kilburn.

== Stall Plates ==
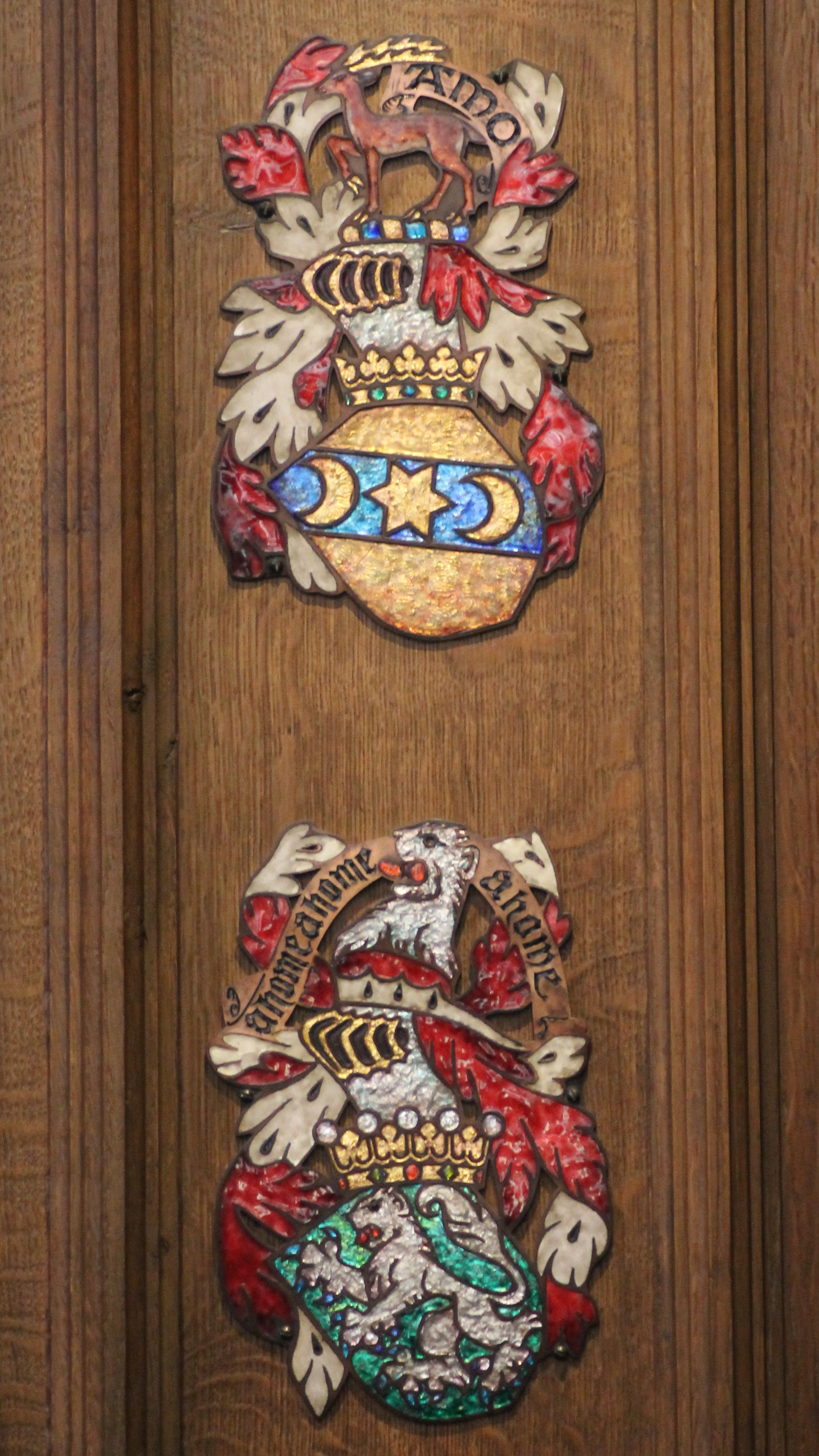
Stall plates by Phoebe Anna Traquair

The arms of each Knight are represented by a plate fixed to the back panel of the Knight's stall. At the death of one Knight, the deceased Knight's plate is retained and a new plate added when a new Knight is appointed. This practice is well-established in the United Kingdom's orders of chivalry: similar plaques have been installed for Knights of the Garter at St George's Chapel, Windsor Castle since the 15th century.

Initially, the Knights were seated by date of installation, with the most senior being closest to the Sovereign and royal Knights. As senior Knights died and new Knights were appointed, the Knights moved up stalls in order of seniority and their stall plate moved with them: this has resulted in a concentration of the original plates at the western end of the chapel. Since the 1920s, individual Knights' stall plates have remained on the same stalls, regardless of seniority.

The earliest stall plates in the chapel are the work of Phoebe Anna Traquair. At the time of the chapel's construction, Traquair was well-established in Scotland's Arts and Crafts scene. Despite his being close friends with Traquair, Robert Lorimer initially desired Harold Conrad William Soper of London to produce the enamel stall plates; however, Herbert Maxwell, on behalf of the Trustees, recommend Lorimer engage Traquair as an Edinburgh-based artist. According to Charles Burnett, Traquair's stall plates are "quite unlike any chivalric stall plates seen before". Working at her home studio in Colinton, Traquair used the champlevé technique, setting vitreous enamel over foil to create shimmering, jewel-like surfaces. James Balfour Paul, Lord Lyon King of Arms, preferred the "cut-out" style of stall plate used for the earliest Garter plates at Windsor: this showed the arms without any background or frame and has been followed since 1911, giving a unique consistency to the Thistle stall plates. Paul also ordered that, in complex cases of quartering, only the first quarter be shown.

Traquair produced the nineteen stall plates required for the Chapel in 1911. After 1911, the stall plates were produced by Elizabeth Kirkwood, who was influenced by Traquair's technique and who also introduced modelling to the helm and mantling of the arms to give them a three-dimensional effect. Since 1963, the arms have been produced by A. Kirkwood & Son of Edinburgh; since 1990, resin has been used instead of enamel. The stall plates of the Marquess of Bute (1922) and the Earl of Crawford and Balcarres (1955) are the work of Harold Conrad William Soper of London.

All heraldic details in the chapel were based on drawings by John Sutherland, who produced designs for stall plates until 1928. Since then, the stall plates have usually been designed by the incumbent Herald Painter to the Court of the Lord Lyon.

== Textiles ==
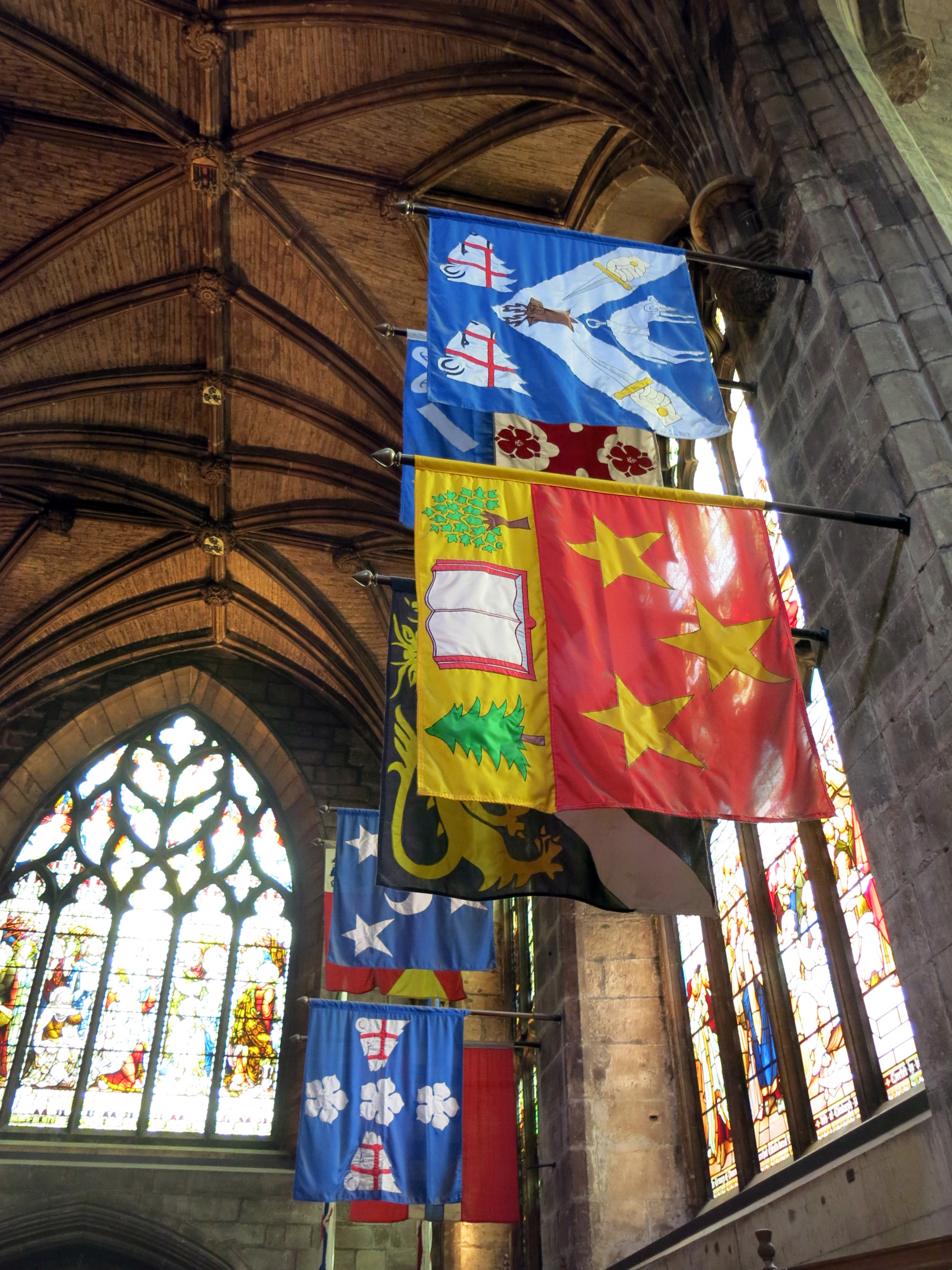
Knights' banners in the Preston Aisle of St Giles' Cathedral

At the chapel's construction, Nell Kay Drew of Edinburgh produced mantling to hang from the helms atop each Knight's stall. The mantling above the Knights' stalls is damask with cloth of gold mantling above the royal stalls. Whytock & Reid of Edinburgh supplied two sets of brocade curtains for the east end: one set, in green, is for everyday use and the other, in red, is for use during the services of the Order.

In 1935, Captain William Dunn donated an old Spanish altar cloth to the Dean of the Thistle, Charles Warr; this cloth is the property of the Order and is held in the custody of St Giles'.

At the opening in 1911, no satisfactory way was found in which to hang the Knights' banners inside the chapel. George V ultimately ruled no banners would be hung at all. Since 1953, the Knights' banners have been hung in the adjoining Preston Aisle of St Giles' Cathedral.

== Use ==
The Knights of the Thistle usually meet for worship in the Thistle Chapel every other year at the installation of new Knights by the monarch. They also meet annually on the Sunday nearest Saint Andrew's Day: this service was inaugurated by George V.

At the installation service, the Sovereign arrives from the Holyrood Palace then processes into St Giles’ Cathedral from the Signet Library with the Knights and officers of the order. In the chapel, a new Knight is conducted to his/her stall and takes an oath. After the installation, the Sovereign and Knights worship in the cathedral.

At every Thistle service since December 1949, a Bible with binding designed by Linton Lamb has been used. This was presented by George VI to commemorate his daughter's marriage.

Services of the Order are led by the Dean of the Thistle: since 2019, the incumbent has been the Reverend Professor David Fergusson, Dean of the Chapel Royal.

== Assessment ==
"It is a remarkable, and was at the time a unique, example of a true revival of the medieval crafts – traditional yet spontaneous; instinct with the Gothic spirit yet unaffected and of its own age. Its triumphant success was owing primarily to Lorimer's approach to architecture being essentially that of the medieval craftsman-architect…"

— Christopher Hussey, The Work of Sir Robert Lorimer (1931)

At the time of the Thistle Chapel's construction, commissions such as Ardkinglas and Lympne Castle had established Robert Lorimer's reputation as a domestic architect across the United Kingdom; yet his only major ecclesiastical commission prior to the Thistle Chapel was St Peter's Roman Catholic Church, Morningside and the Thistle Chapel was his first building in "full Gothic" style. The Thistle Chapel nevertheless established Lorimer as, in Peter Savage's words, "Scotland's leading exponent of the Gothic": a fact recognised by Lorimer's knighthood and his receipt of major Gothic commissions such as the restorations of Dunblane Cathedral and Paisley Abbey and, later, the design of the Scottish National War Memorial. In the Thistle Chapel, in Stewart Matthew's assessment, "the very essence of Gothic architecture was achieved: an emphasis of the vertical which gives a sense of reaching upwards beyond material confines."

The Thistle Chapel also dates to a period of when Scottish architects were attempting to recreate a distinctly Scottish style of church architecture. Ranald MacInnes, Miles Glendinning, and Aonghus MacKechnie identify the Thistle Chapel as "the most emphatic example of the nationalist trend in church architecture". MacInnes, Glendinning, and MacKechnie contrast the chapel's "ecclesiastical lavishness" and "Rosslyn-like elaboration" with John James Burnet's "simpler evocation of archaic monumentality" and Ramsay Traquair and Reginald Fairlie's revival of the neo-Romanesque trend in 15th century Scottish church architecture.

Alongside its importance as a Gothic building, the Thistle Chapel is, in Louise Boreham's words, "an exquisite jewel of the entire Arts and Crafts movement." Commentators including Annette Carruthers; MacInnes, Glendinning, and MacKechnie; Savage; and the authors of the Buildings of Scotland series note that the overall effect of the Thistle Chapel is achieved, not solely through Lorimer's design, but through "Traditionalist crafts collaboration": the essence of the Arts and Crafts movement.

A number of commentators also recognise the national and political significance of the chapel. Charles Burnett notes that, on completion of the Thistle Chapel, "[the] ancient realm of Scotland had clawed back a major element in the unique identity of the country". Similarly, Stewart Matthew noted the Chapel and Order's civic significance: "Edinburgh gained one of Scotland's richest architectural wonders of the 20th century and, to the lasting honour and dignity of the city, became the centre of Scotland's premier order of chivalry." MacInnes, Glendinning, and MacKechnie describe the design of the building as being "motivated less by religious 'worshipfulness' than by imperial Scottish patriotism". Likewise, the authors of the Buildings of Scotland series, while praising the chapel's architecture, call the Chapel "an introverted celebration of the Order and only secondarily of God."

== See also ==
- St Giles' Cathedral
- Order of the Thistle
- Robert Lorimer

== Bibliography ==
- Blair, Robin et al. (2009). The Thistle Chapel: Within St Giles' Cathedral, Edinburgh. The Order of the Thistle. ISBN 978-0956240705
  - Boreham, Louise.
    - "The Chapel"
    - "Stone"
    - "Wood"
    - "Bronze & Fine Metals"
  - Burnett, Charles J.
    - "Genesis of the Chapel"
    - "Changes & Additions to the Chapel"
  - Cumming, Elizabeth.
    - "The Architect"
    - "Stained Glass"
    - "Enamelwork"
    - "Iron, Lead & Embroidery"
  - Roads, Elizabeth.
    - "The Heraldic Artists"
- Burnett, Charles J. and Hodgson, Leslie (2001). Stall Plates of the Most Ancient and Most Noble Order of the Thistle in the Chapel of the Order within St Giles' Cathedral, the High Kirk of Edinburgh. The Heraldry Society of Scotland. ISBN 0952525836
- Carruthers, Annette (2013). The Arts and Crafts Movement in Scotland: A History. Yale University Press. ISBN 978-0300195767
- Gifford, John; McWilliam, Colin; Walker, David (1984). The Buildings of Scotland: Edinburgh. Penguin Books. ISBN 014071068X
- Gordon, Esmé (1959). St Giles' Cathedral and the Chapel of the Thistle, Edinburgh. Pillans & Wilson Ltd.
- Hussey, Christopher (1931). The Work of Sir Robert Lorimer. Country Life Limited.
- MacInnes, Ranald; Glendinning, Miles; MacKechnie, Aonghus
  - (1996). A History of Scottish Architecture: From the Renaissance to the Present Day. Edinburgh University Press. ISBN 0748608494
  - (1999). Building a Nation: The Story of Scotland's Architecture. Canongate ISBN 0862418305
- Matthew, Stewart (1988). The Knights & Chapel of the Most Ancient and Most Noble Order of the Thistle: A Panoramic View. Eaglebank Publications. ISBN 0950889806
- Marshall, Rosalind K. (2009). St Giles': The Dramatic Story of a Great Church and its People. Saint Andrew Press. ISBN 978-0715208830
- Nicol, Kirsty (1998). St Giles' Cathedral: The Thistle Chapel. Pitkin Unichrome Ltd. ISBN 1871004586
- Savage, Peter (1980). Lorimer and the Edinburgh Craft Designers. Paul Harris Publishing. ISBN 0904505391
