= Joseph Hayes =

Joseph, Joe, or Joey Hayes may refer to:

- Joseph Hayes (general) (1835–1912), Union Army brigadier general
- Joseph H. Acklen (1850–1938), U.S. Representative from Louisiana, born Joseph Hayes Acklen
- Joe Black Hayes (1915–2013), American football player and coach
- Joseph Hayes (author) (1918–2006), American author and playwright
- Joseph Hayes (sculptor) (1869-1916) British sculptor killed in WWI
- Joe L. Hayes (born 1930), American businessman, civil engineer and politician
- Joe L. Hayes Jr. (born 1970), American politician in Alaska
- Joe Hayes (American football), American football player
- Joe Hayes (author and storyteller) (born 1945), author and storyteller of American Southwest folklore stories
- Joe Hayes (footballer) (1936–1999), association footballer who played in the 1950s and 1960s for Manchester City, Barnsley, and Wigan Athletic
- Joe Hayes (hurler) (born 1963), hurler of the 1980s and 1990s for Tipperary, and Clonoulty-Rossmore
- Joey Hayes (born 1976), rugby league footballer who played in the 1990s and 2000s for Great Britain, St. Helens RLFC, Salford, and Oldham Roughyeds
