= Alice Meredith Williams =

English sculptor and painter (1877–1934)

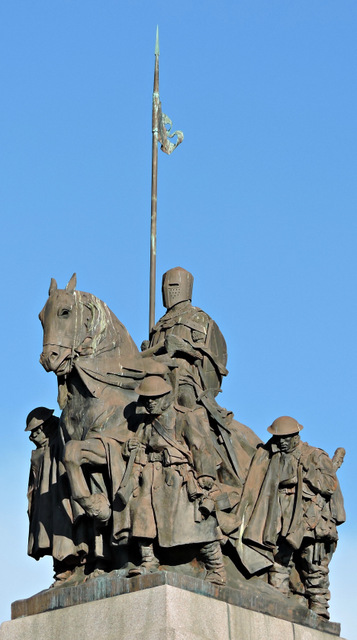
"The Spirit of the Crusaders", Paisley War Memorial, unveiled 1924

Gertrude Alice Meredith Williams (1877 – 3 March 1934), who generally went by the name of Alice Meredith Williams, was a British sculptor, painter, illustrator and stained glass designer.

== Biography ==
Williams was born in Liverpool, the ninth of the ten surviving children of Dr David Williams (b. 1833), a doctor, and his wife Sarah Bland. As a teenager she was privately tutored in still life and landscape painting by R. A. M. Stevenson, Professor of Fine Arts at Liverpool's University College. In her early twenties she won a scholarship to attend Liverpool School of Architecture and Fine Art, where she trained under Charles Allen, Robert Anning Bell and Herbert McNair. Here she was honed as an architectural sculptor. In 1900 she won a travelling scholarship from the City Council and move to Paris where she worked and studied for five years, attending the Académie Colarossi and learning from, among others, Jean Antoine Injalbert, René Prinet, and Emmanuel Frémiet. It is said her work was also criticised positively by Auguste Rodin.

In 1902, in Paris, she met the artist Morris Meredith Williams, four years her junior. Having decided to marry, he left Paris in 1905 for a part-time job as drawing master at Fettes College in Edinburgh. Alice moved temporarily back to Liverpool and lived with two of her sisters while seeking commissions and working, for a few months, for Harold Rathbone at the Della Robbia Pottery. She married Williams in 1906 and they moved into a flat at 27 Danube Street, Edinburgh. Three years later they crossed the road to a larger flat at no. 38.

From 1916 to 1919, while Morris was serving in the Army in France, Williams relocated to Peppard near Henley-upon-Thames. In 1929 she and her husband moved to Devon, renting part of North Wyke manor which lies between North Tawton and South Tawton.

From 1923 to 1932 she served as a ruling council member of the Cockburn Association, Edinburgh's influential conservation organisation.

Meredith Williams died of cancer in Devon on 3 March 1934, aged 56. She is buried in the churchyard of St Andrew's in South Tawton, beneath a stone designed by her husband.

== Work ==
Meredith Williams's memorial works include a war memorial for Komani (formerly Queenstown), South Africa; "The Spirit of the Crusaders", a sculptural group for the Paisley War Memorial, designed by Sir Robert Lorimer; and a painted plaster reredos for St. James the Less Episcopal Church in Penicuik (1921). She also created twelve works for the Scottish National War Memorial at Edinburgh Castle (1927), including the figure of St. Michael hovering over the casket containing the names of the dead (carved by the Clow Brothers), and the frieze in the Shrine, designed with her husband Morris and for which th cartoons were drawn by him. She exhibited works at the Royal Scottish Academy and the Royal Academy of Arts.
