= Joseph Hayes (sculptor) =

Scottish sculptor and art teacher

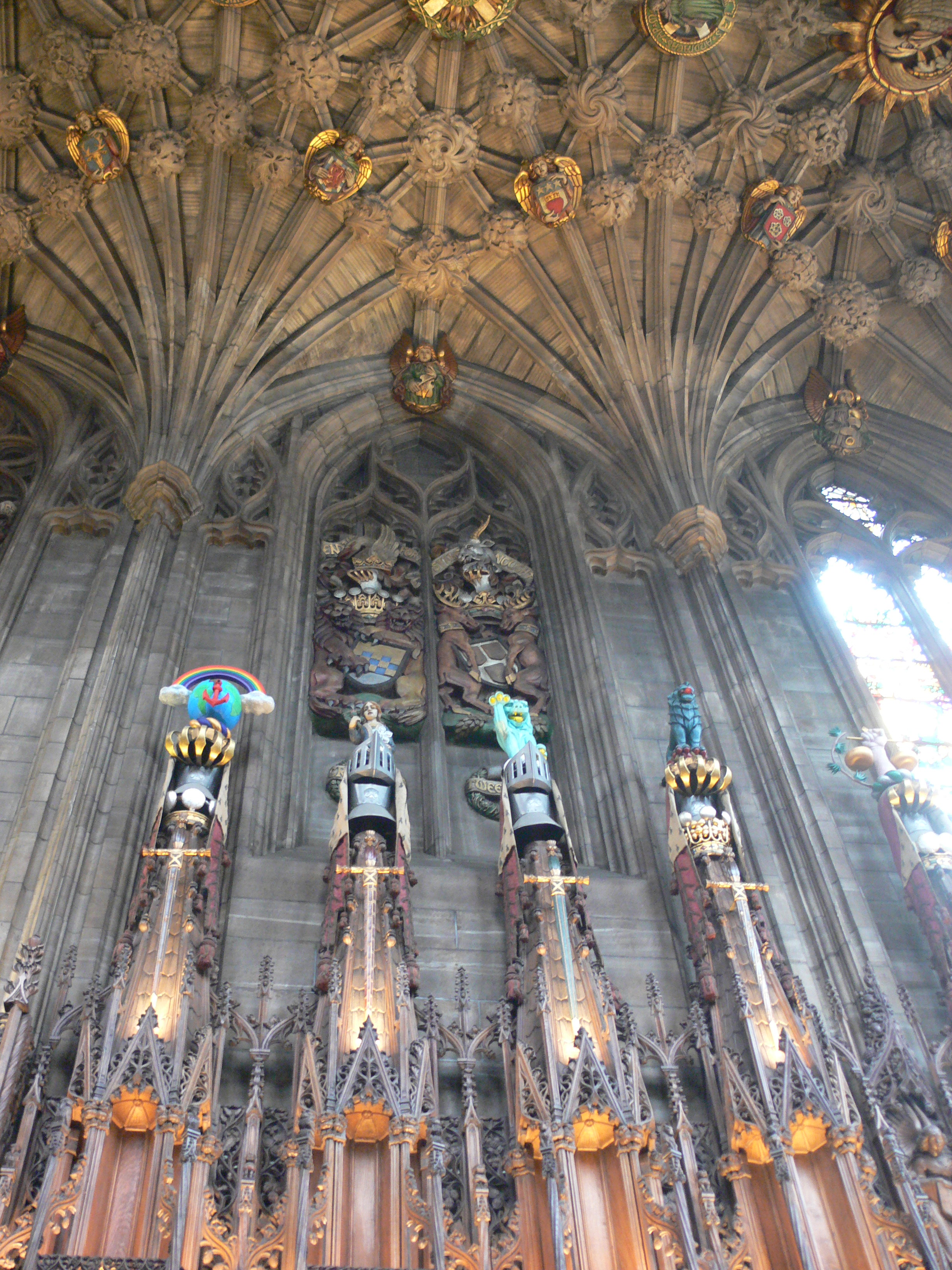
Thistle Chapel in St Giles Cathedral

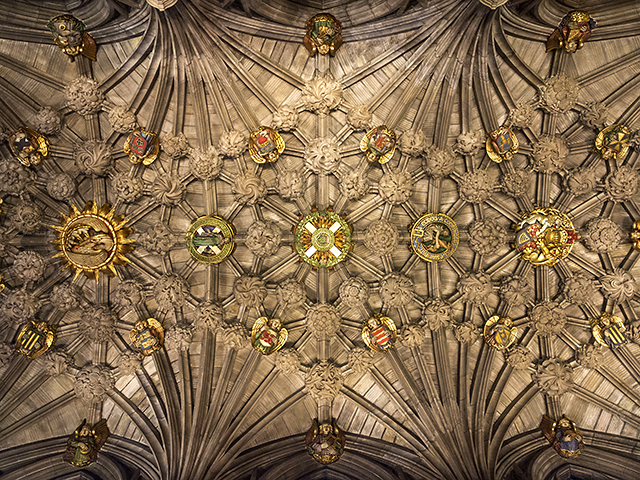
The fan faulted ceiling of the Thistle Chapel, by Joseph Hayes

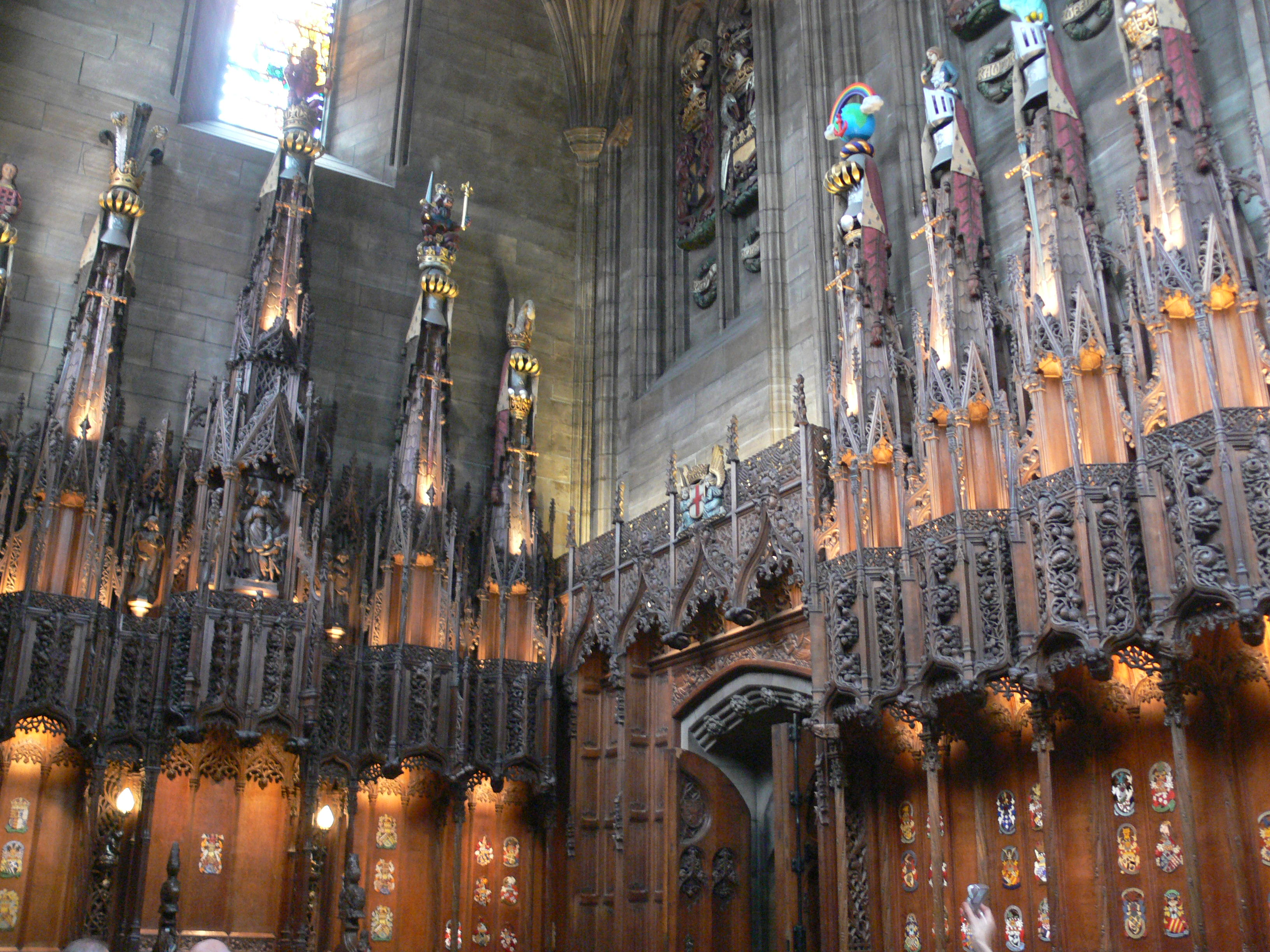
Pinnacles over the Knights' seating in the Thistle Chapel in St Giles Cathedral

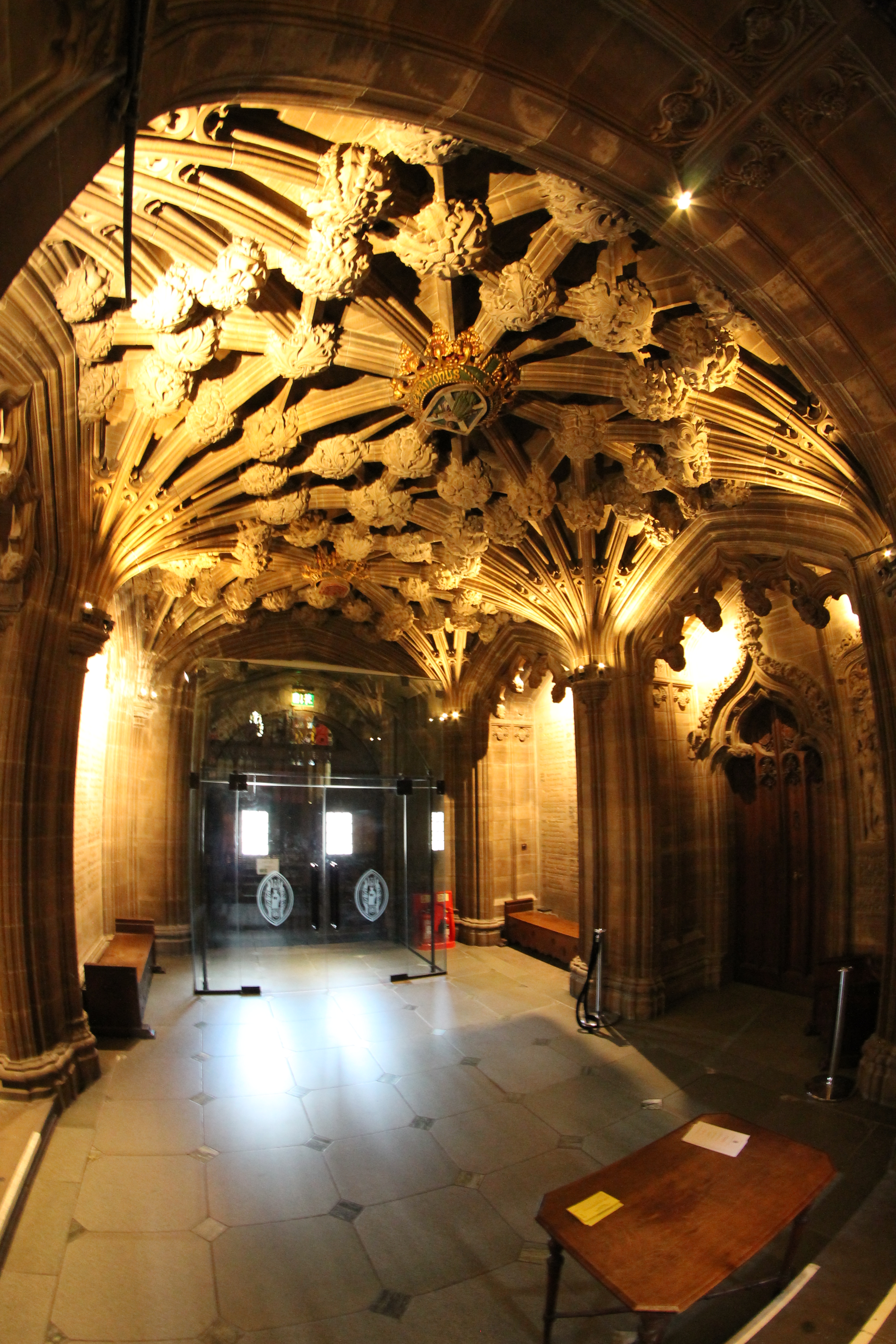
Thistle Chapel Ante-Chapel

Joseph Hayes (1869–1916) was a Scottish sculptor and art teacher. He is best known for the Thistle Chapel within St Giles Cathedral. His career was cut short when he was killed in the First World War.

== Life ==
He was born in Aldershot in England to parents of Irish descent. His father had served in the Scots Greys. His mother wished him to study for the priesthood but his artistic talent resulted in his being apprenticed to a sculptor in London.

Around 1900 the Scots architect Robert Lorimer was commissioned to design various chimneypieces for the South Kensington Museum in London. Through this connection he encountered Hayes who had been working on the 1899 extension known as the Aston Webb building. He was impressed with Hayes' work and enticed him to go to Edinburgh with him to work on the Thistle Chapel - a project a decade in the making. The Thistle Chapel sits in the south-east corner of St Giles Cathedral. Although of 20th century creation, it is of medieval form with complex fan vaulting and highly ornate carving, and was to house the ceremony linked to the creation of Knights of the Thistle.

Hayes and his wife moved to Edinburgh in 1900. His studio was the Dean Studio on Belford Road, near Dean Village in the west of Edinburgh. The bulk of the stone and wood carving were created in the Dean Studio and assembled in St Giles over the year 1909/10. The works involved the chapel, its outer hallway (ante-chapel), and the remodelling of the east entrance. The chapel includes three royal stalls (the central to seat the sovereign) and sixteen stalls to seat the knights.

Hayes volunteered to join up in the First World War in 1915 aged 46. He joined the Black Watch as a private and was promoted to corporal. He was killed on 3 September 1916 at Longueval on the Somme and is buried there at Caterpillar Valley Cemetery plot XII.F.22.

== Family ==
He was married to Alexandra Douglas (1870-1929).

== Projects ==
- Thistle Chapel (1902-1909) installed 1908/9
- Carving on Boroughmuir School (1909-1911)
- Edinburgh College of Art 1908/9

== Smaller works ==
- Figure of St John for St Peters Church, Morningside, Edinburgh (1907)
