= St Peter's Church, Edinburgh =

St Peter's Church
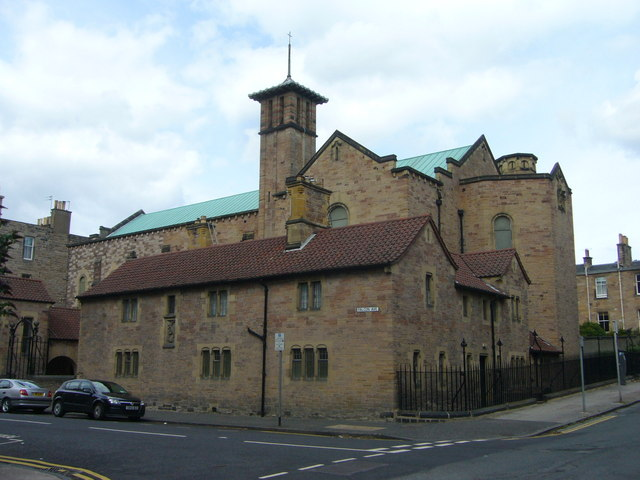
- St Peter's Church
- 55.9305°N 3.2062°W
- Location: Morningside, Edinburgh
- Country: Scotland
- Denomination: Roman Catholic
- Website: St Peter's Parish, Edinburgh

History
- Status: Parish church
- Founder(s): Canon John Gray; Marc-André Raffalovitch
- Dedication: Saint Peter
- Events: Nave extended 1928-9

Architecture
- Functional status: Active
- Heritage designation: Category A listed
- Designated: 14 December 1970
- Architect: Sir Robert Lorimer
- Style: Italianate

Administration
- Province: St Andrews and Edinburgh
- Archdiocese: St Andrews and Edinburgh
- Deanery: St Giles

St Peter's Church is a parish of the Roman Catholic Church in the Morningside district of Edinburgh, Scotland, within the Archdiocese of St Andrews and Edinburgh.

The parish church, designed by Sir Robert Lorimer, was built from 1906 to 1907, and the nave was extended from 1928 to 1929. It is situated on the corner of Falcon Avenue and Falcon Gardens, to the east of Morningside Road. It is a category A listed building.

== History ==
=== Foundation ===
The church was founded by Canon John Gray and Marc-André Raffalovitch. In 1901, Gray resigned as librarian at the Foreign Office to become a priest of the Catholic Church. When he was curate at St Patrick's Church, Edinburgh, Gray with Raffalovitch as benefactor planned to build St Peter's Church. Raffalovitch was once part of Oscar Wilde's circle of friends.

=== Construction ===
Perceiving the need for a new parish to serve Morningside, on 31 March 1905 Archbishop James Smith arranged for Fr Gray to leave his post at St Patrick's and take charge of the new parish of St Peter's. Gray engaged Robert Lorimer to design the church in 1905. Lorimer also designed St Andrew's Garrison Church in Aldershot and Knightswood St Margaret's Parish Church. Construction started in 1906 and the church was opened on 25 April 1907.

In 1927, Robert Lorimer was knighted and the next year in 1928, work began to extend the nave of the church, again under the direction of Lorimer. In 1929, it was completed.

=== Developments ===
Following the liturgical reforms of the Second Vatican Council, much of the church furniture, designed by Lorimer, was removed. The cast-iron altar rails, which had fish motifs, were removed. The altar, made of marble, has almost been completely lost.

== Parish ==
The church has one Sunday Mass at 11:30 am. Usually, there are Masses or Liturgy of the Word at 9 am from Monday to Friday.

From 2017 the parishes in Edinburgh were organised into clusters to better co-ordinate their resources. St Peter's is one of four parishes in Cluster 4 along with St Columba's, Sacred Heart and St Mark's.
