= Earlshall Castle =

Building in Fife, Scotland

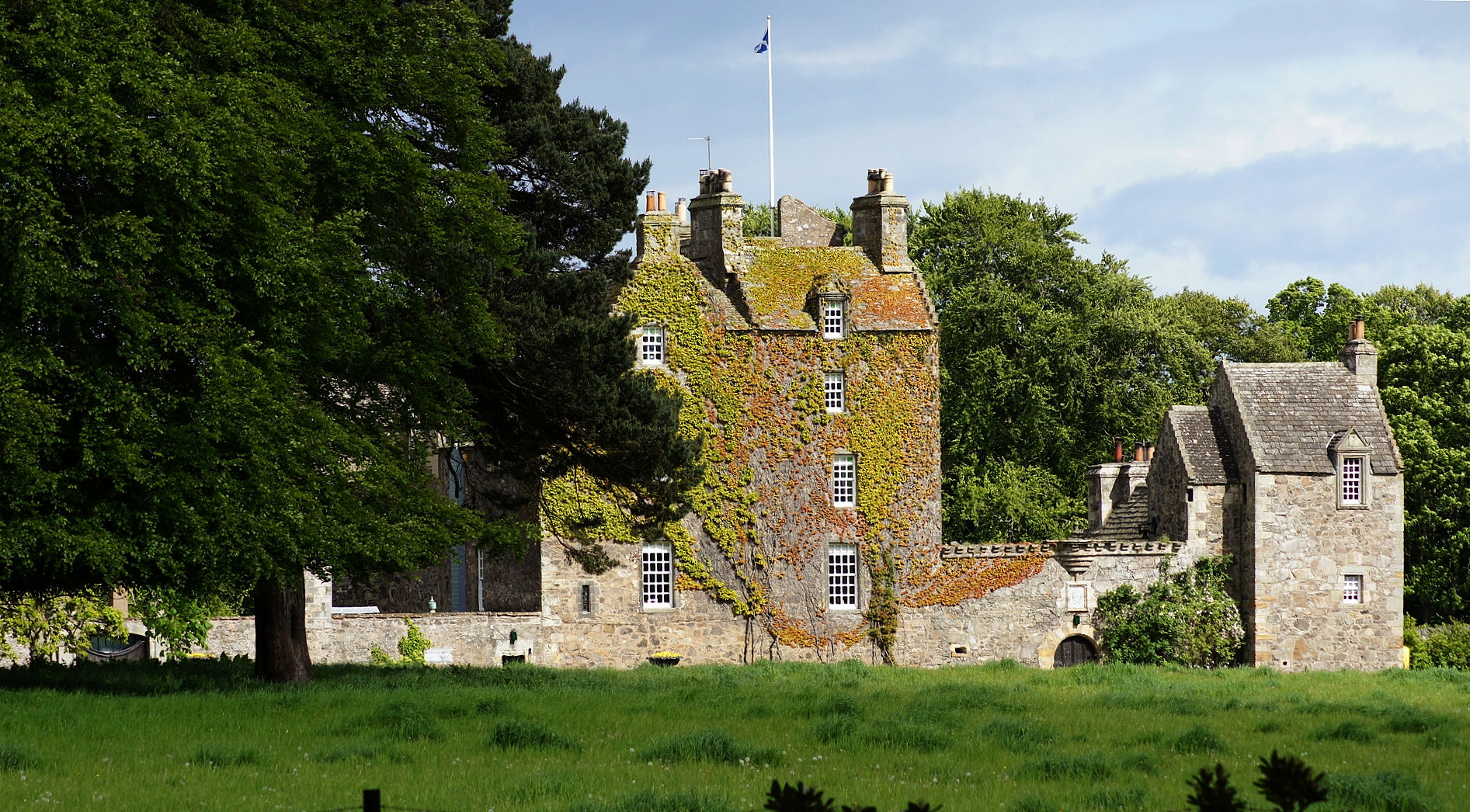
- Earlshall Castle, Leuchars, Fife

- Location within Scotland

General information
- Architectural style: Courtyard castle
- Location: Leuchars, Fife, Scotland
- Coordinates: 56.3788698°N 2.8683990°W
- Owner: Clan Baxter

Inventory of Gardens and Designed Landscapes in Scotland
- Official name: Earlshall
- Designated: 30 June 1987
- Reference no.: GDL00168

Earlshall Castle is a restored 16th century courtyard castle, near Leuchars Station about 1/2 mile (800 metres) east of Leuchars, Fife, Scotland.

It has been described as “a perfect example of a 16/17th century mansion”.

== History ==
The castle was built by Sir William Bruce, a survivor of the Battle of Flodden, in 1546. One member of the family died at the battle of Worcester in 1651. Another, Sir Andrew, gained himself the name “Bloody Bruce” by hacking off the hands and head of Covenanter Richard Cameron after defeating him at the battle of Airds Moss during the Killing Time.

The Bruce line was extinct by 1708. Henderson of Fordell inherited the castle and kept it until 1824. Due to lack of maintenance, the structure became derelict. In 1890, the property was purchased by Robert Mackenzie, a bleacher from Perth, who hired Sir Robert Lorimer to complete a restoration in 1892. The property has passed through several hands since, and is still occupied. The tapestries, paintings and Lorimer furniture have been dispersed.

In August 2020 the castle was for sale. Reports indicated that there were 10 bedrooms and 8 reception rooms" and features such as "royal coats of arms decorating a vaulted ceiling and an arched gatehouse ... wooden panelling and period fireplaces". As of February 2026 the property is still for sale, at an asking price of €8,000,000.

== Structure ==
There is a main block of three storeys and a garret. There is a large tower at one corner, with a small stair-turret in the angle with the main block. On the other corner a round stair tower is corbelled out to square; at the top is a watch-chamber. The dormer pediments are decorated by carved heraldic devices, and inscribed with the initials W.B. and S.A.C. The vaulted basement is reached through the entrance in the stair-tower. On the first floor is the hall, which has panelled walls, and a large carved fireplace, 9 feet (2.7 metres) wide. The second floor ceiling is decorated in tempera; this dates from 1620. The decoration includes paintings of an ostrich and an armadillo, and mottoes such as “A NICE WYF AND A BACK DOORE OFT MAKETH A RICH MAN POORE”. The ceiling was carefully taken down and the missing parts replaced during the restoration by Lorimer.

The main block, with a slightly higher wing, occupies two sides of the courtyard; there is a separate tower with three storey, the lower two vaulted, and some buildings dated to the 17th century. The courtyard is entered through an archway, dated 1546, bearing the arms of Sir William Bruce. There is a formal garden, replanted since the restoration of 1892. It has yew hedges and topiary. The castle is a category A listed building.
