= Lahana =

Lahana is a surname. Notable people with the surname include:

- Cyril Lahana, South African lawn bowler
- Emma Lahana (born c. 1984), New Zealand actress
