= Robert Lorimer =

Scottish architect (1864–1929)

Sir Robert Stodart Lorimer
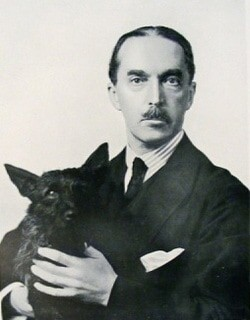
- Born: 4 November 1864; Edinburgh, Scotland
- Died: 13 September 1929 (aged 64); Edinburgh, Scotland
- Education: University of Edinburgh
- Occupations: Architect, Furniture designer
- Spouse: Violet Wyld
- Buildings: Ardkinglas House

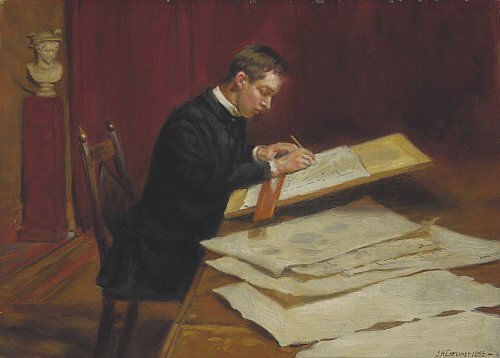
John Henry Lorimer: Robert Lorimer, at work (1886)

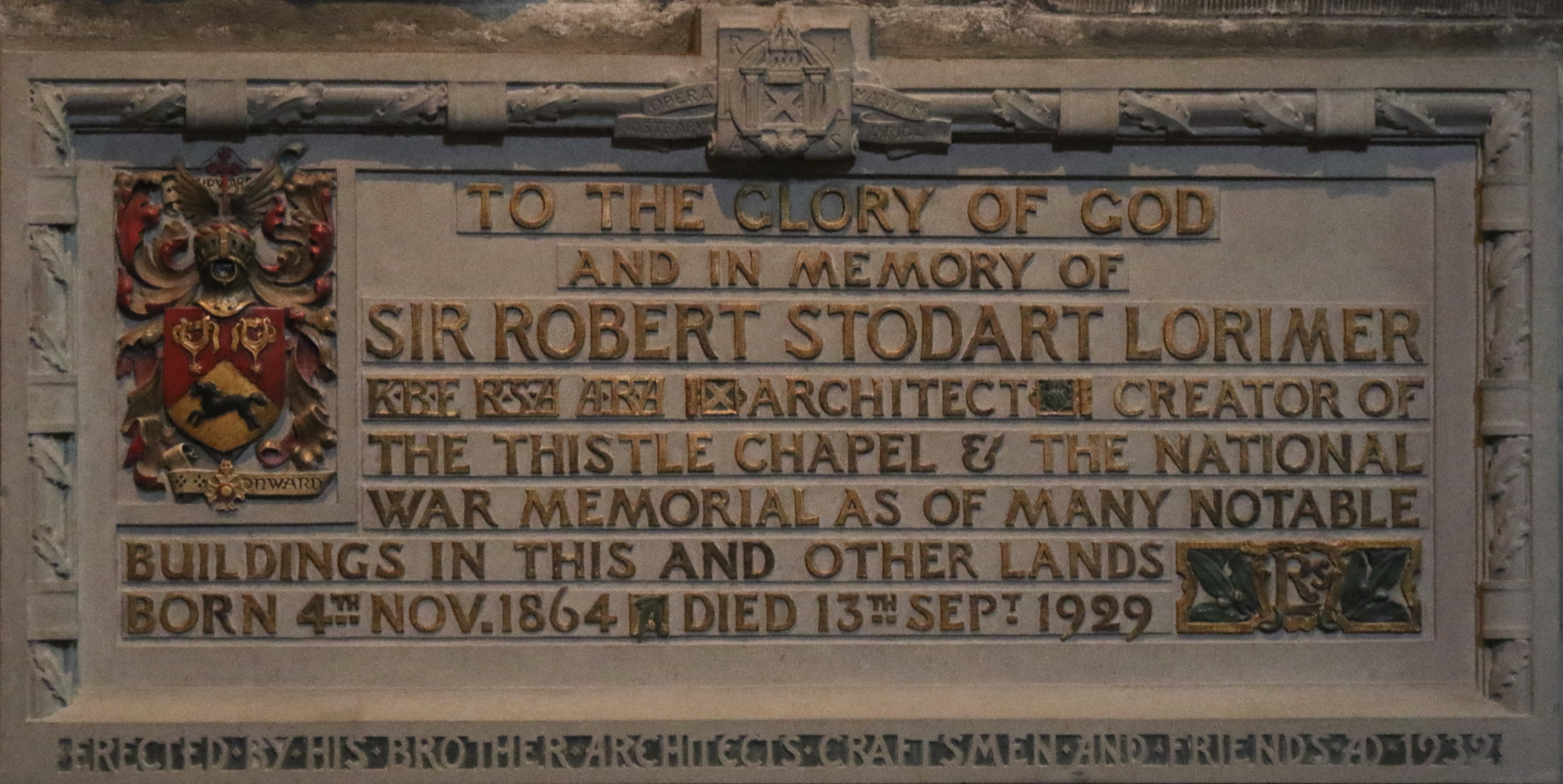
Memorial in St Giles' Cathedral designed by his friend A. N. Paterson

Sir Robert Stodart Lorimer, KBE (4 November 1864 – 13 September 1929) was a prolific Scottish architect and furniture designer noted for his sensitive restorations of historic houses and castles, for new work in Scots Baronial and Gothic Revival styles, and for promotion of the Arts and Crafts movement.

== Early life ==
Lorimer was born in Edinburgh, the son of Hannah Stodart (1835–1916) and James Lorimer, who was Regius Professor of Public Law at University of Edinburgh from 1862 to 1890. In his youth, the family lived at 21 Hill Street, a Georgian house in Edinburgh's South Side, close to where his father worked at Old College.

From 1877 to 1882, he was educated at Edinburgh Academy, going on to study at University of Edinburgh from 1882 to 1885, however he left without completing his studies. He was part of a talented family, being the younger brother of painter John Henry Lorimer, and father to the sculptor Hew Lorimer. In 1878 the Lorimer family acquired the lease of Kellie Castle in Fife and began its restoration for use as a holiday home.

Lorimer began his architectural career in 1885 working for Sir Robert Rowand Anderson in Edinburgh, and in 1889 for George Frederick Bodley in London. He returned to Edinburgh opening his own practice in 1891. His first major restoration commission was Earlshall Castle in Fife for Robert MacKenzie, a friend of his parents.

He was influenced by Scottish domestic architecture of the 16th and 17th centuries and the Scottish baronial style of Kellie Castle where he had spent much of his childhood and adolescence. From his time in Bodley's office, Lorimer was influenced by the ideas of William Morris, and went on to become a committed exponent of the Arts and Crafts approach to architecture. He assembled a collaborative group of artists and craftsmen who, collectively, often contributed to his various commissions and to the manufacture of furniture sent to the Arts and Crafts exhibitions in London. In 1896 he was elected to the Art Workers Guild.

Lorimer designed a series of cottages in the Arts and Crafts style in the Colinton area of Edinburgh, the so-called "Colinton Cottages". Constructed using traditional methods and materials, each cottage included a garden layout and interior design, including furniture, in keeping with the Arts and Crafts concept. By 1900, eight cottages had been built and four others were under construction.

Lorimer designed a private residence in Helsinki for industrialist Ossian Donner and his Scottish wife, Violet McHutchen. At that time, the autonomous Grand Duchy of Finland belonged to the Russian Empire. The house, located at Maurinkatu 6 and representing English and Scottish styles, was completed in 1901. The Donners fled the Russian Revolution to Britain, and sold the house to Svenska Klubben in 1932.

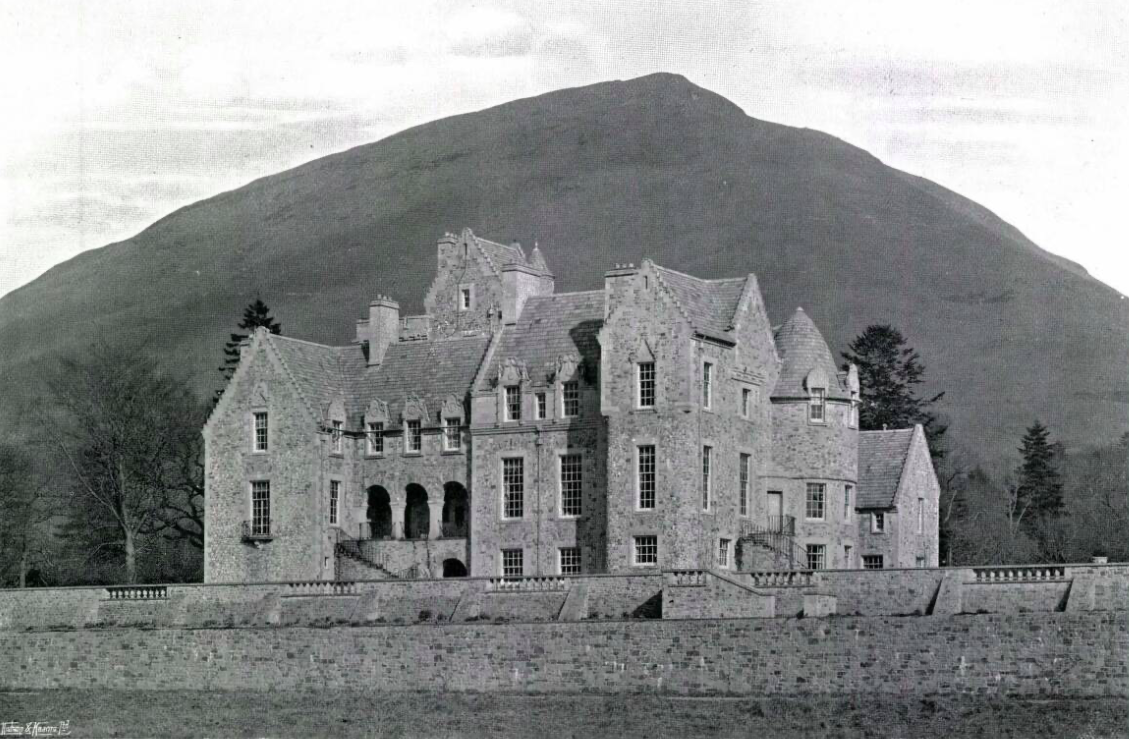
Ardkinglas 1911

As his reputation grew the scale of his commissions increased, including major alterations and additions to important houses in various styles, culminating in three entirely new country houses designed in his personal interpretation of Scots baronial style; at Rowallan Castle, Ayrshire (1903), Ardkinglas, Argyll (1906), and Formakin House, Renfrewshire (1912). Of these, Ardkinglas, on Loch Fyne, was the only one built as originally designed and, Lorimer having been given carte blanche, represents his masterpiece.

His important restorations at this time include Lennoxlove House, Haddington (1912) and probably his most evocative; at Dunderave Castle, Argyllshire (1912) on the Ardkinglas estate. He could take a house of modest character and give it a strong personality, such as Pitkerro, Forfarshire (1902) or Briglands, Kinross (from 1903), particularly where he found the raw materials sympathetic, but he could also disregard existing architectural qualities in a way that modern conservation practice would question, if he felt the result justified its replacement, such as at Hill of Tarvit, Fife (1907) where he demolished a previous house probably by Sir William Bruce, or at Marchmont, Berwickshire (1914) where he re-configured an altered house by William Adam (from 1750), ignoring Adam's design.

He was called in to a number of properties to carry out a range of improvements, such as minor alterations, design of interiors and furnishings, work to ancillary buildings, and garden designs and features. A good representative of this sort of work is Hunterston Castle in Ayrshire (1912).

== Later life ==
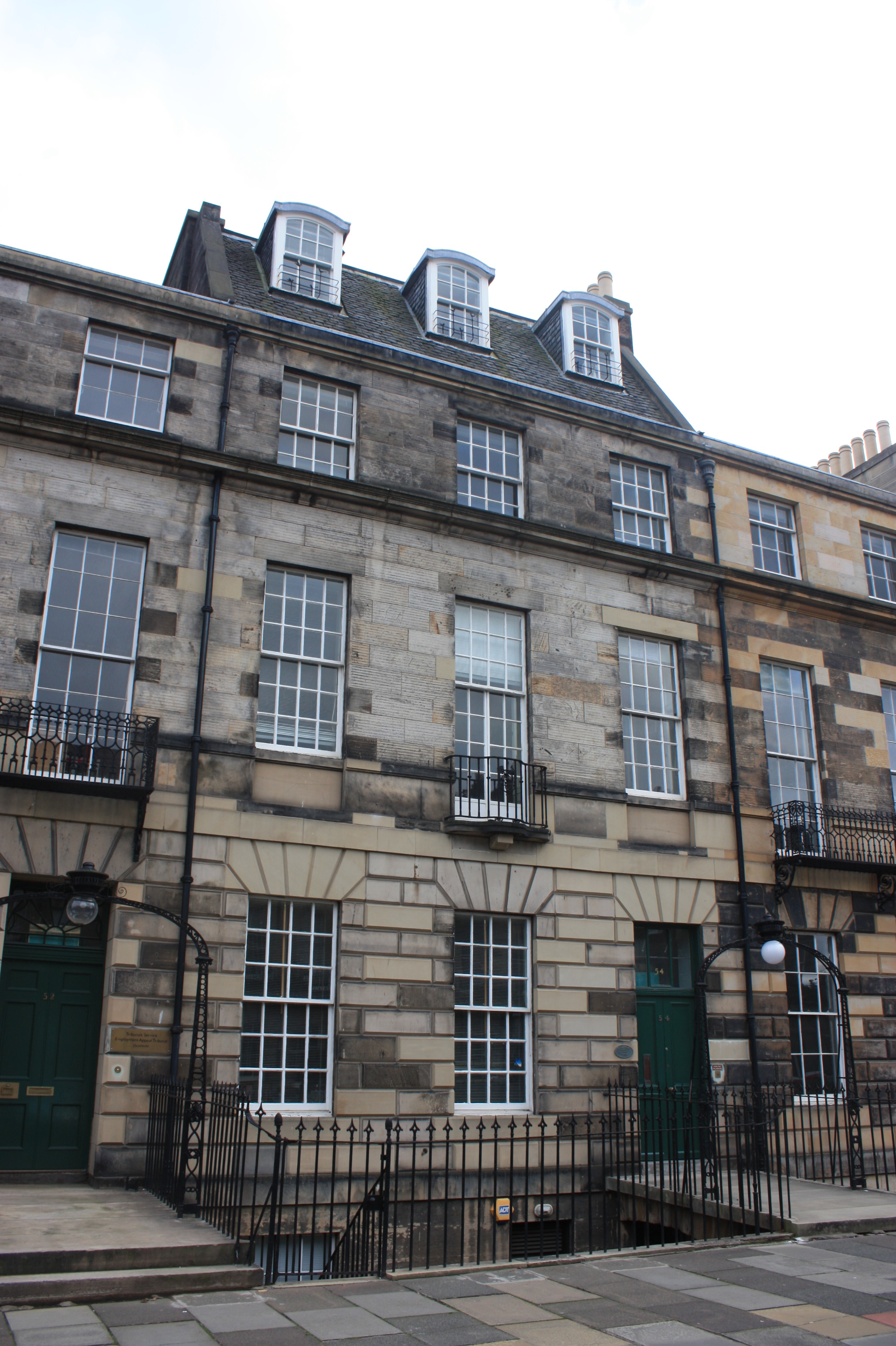
Lorimer's house at 54 Melville Street, Edinburgh

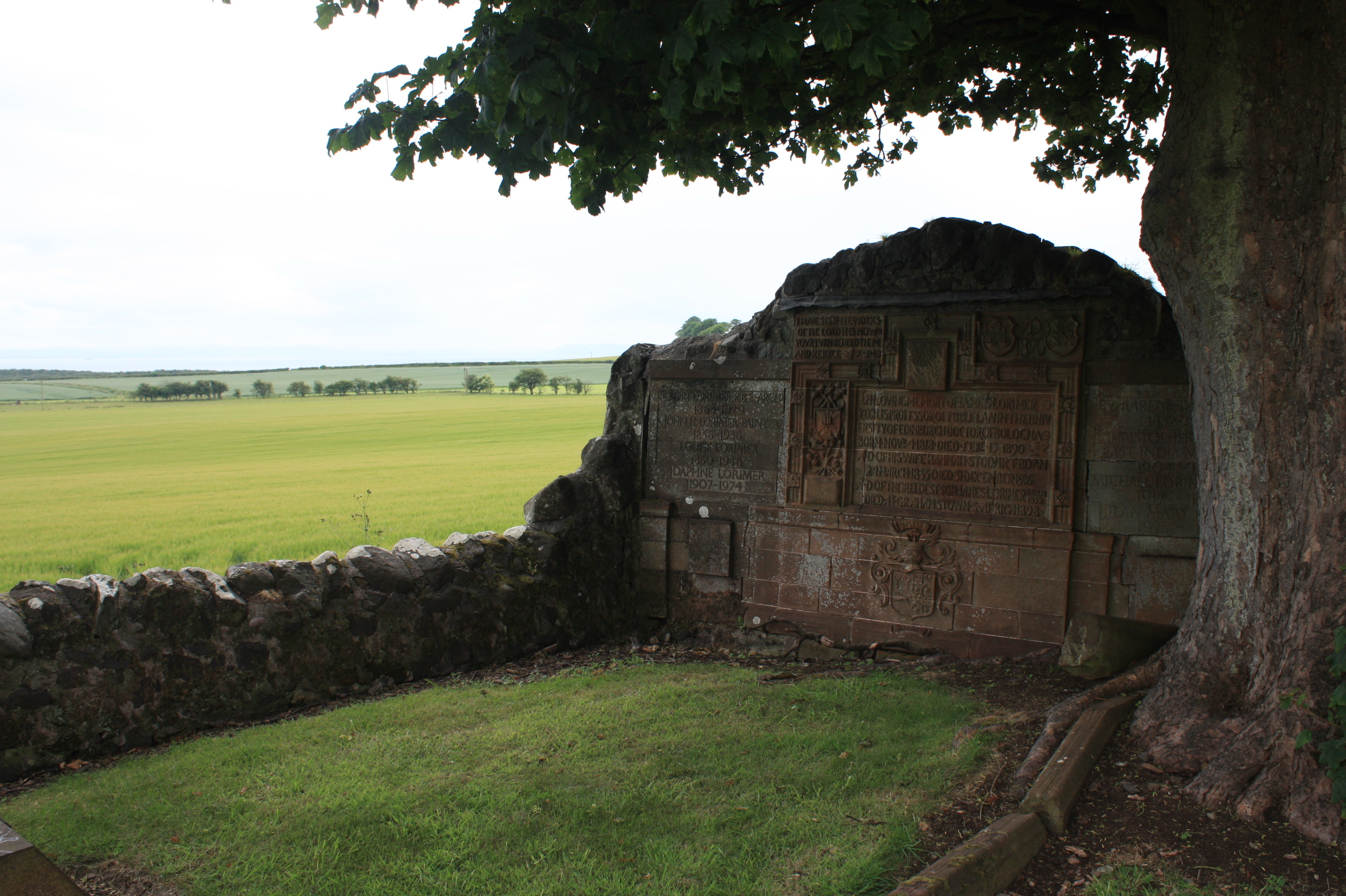
The Lorimer family grave, Newburn, Fife

The First World War restricted the demand for large new houses and his attention shifted to smaller scale projects, war memorials, and restorations. He already had a reputation as one of Scotland's leading restoration architects following the restoration of Earlshall and Dunderave, and he went on to carry out significant alteration and restoration works at Dunrobin Castle in Sutherland following a fire (1915), and at Balmanno Castle in Perthshire (1916), said to have been the only one of his commissions he would like to have lived in.

Although much of his work, and reputation, was in the sphere of domestic architecture, Lorimer also carried out significant public works. Principal amongst these include his design for the new chapel for the Knights of the Thistle in St Giles' Cathedral, Edinburgh in 1911. He received a knighthood for his efforts and went on to gain the commission for the Scottish National War Memorial at Edinburgh Castle in 1919, subsequently opened by the Prince of Wales in 1927. Following the completion of the memorial, Lorimer was in December 1927 appointed a Knight Commander of the Order of the British Empire (KBE).

He designed the Doiran Memorial and the three great naval memorials to the missing: Portsmouth Naval Memorial, Plymouth Naval Memorial and Chatham Naval Memorial, each of which is a Grade I Listed Building.

Another notable work from this period is the War Memorial and extension to the Burgh Buildings, designed in 1923 and completed in 1927, adjacent to his earlier fountain (1913), an early urban improvement scheme built over the former mill lade at Corn Mill Square, Galashiels.

Lorimer was also responsible for St Andrew's Garrison Church, Aldershot, completed 1927, a large Army church dedicated to the soldiers of the Church of Scotland and kindred churches who lost their lives in World War One. In 1928, he returned to complete St Peter's Church in Morningside, Edinburgh, which he had designed in 1905. One of his last works (completed posthumously) was Knightswood St Margaret's Parish Church, Glasgow, which was dedicated in 1932.

Lorimer became President of the professional body in Scotland, the Incorporation of Architects in Scotland, and it was during his tenure in office that the body received its second royal charter, permitting use of the term 'Royal' in the title. Lorimer was a fellow of the North British Academy of Arts.

Ironically Lorimer lived in a mid-19th century town-house designed by Robert Brown, 54 Melville Street in Edinburgh, but Lorimer did heavily remodel the building when he bought it in 1903, adding small window panes, an extra attic storey, and central French doors on the frontage leading to a small balcony. He lived here for his last 26 years, though he died at 12 Randolph Crescent, Edinburgh in 1929.

He was cremated at the newly opened Warriston Crematorium and his ashes were thereafter buried with his parents at Newburn in rural south-east Fife, close to the family home of Kellie Castle. The grave (which he had designed himself at the death of his father) lies in the extreme south-west corner of this tiny and very remote churchyard, overlooking rural Fife towards the Firth of Forth.

== World War I work ==
Over and above the Scottish National War Memorial at Edinburgh Castle, Lorimer was responsible for the simple and elegant design of the Commonwealth gravestone and for the design of several CWGC cemeteries in Germany (for PoWs dying in captivity) and in the Middle East. In 1918, Lorimer was appointed Principal Architect to the Imperial War Graves Commission. Between 1919 and 1927, he designed over three hundred war memorials in Britain, France, Italy, Germany, Greece, Macedonia, Egypt, Palestine, and one in Queenstown in South Africa.

Cemeteries by Lorimer include: Bordighera (Italy); Campo Santo in Genoa (Italy); Monte Sunio, Caltrano near Venice (Italy); Savara (Italy); Taranto (Italy); Chatby (Egypt); El Arish (Egypt); Hadra near Alexandria (Egypt); Ismailia (Egypt); Kantara (Egypt); Minia (Egypt); Tel El-Kabir (Egypt); Lake Dorian (North Macedonia); Baranthal, Asiago near Vernice (Italy); Boscon, Asiago near Venice (Italy); Cairo War Cemetery (Italy); Cavalletto, Asiago near Venice (Italy); Doiran (Greece); Granezza, Asiago near Venice (Italy); Karasouli (Salonika); Hortakoi, Kirechkoi (Thessalonika); Lahana (Thessalonika); Magnaboschi, Asiago near Venice (Italy); Montecchio Precalcino near Venice (Italy); Port Said (Egypt); Salonika; Sarigol near Kriston (Greece); Struma near Kalokastron (Greece); Suez (Egypt); Stahnsdorf POW cemetery near Berlin (Germany); Colonial Hill (North Macedonia); Delijski Vis, Palilula, Nis, Serbia; Niederzwehren POW cemetery near Berlin (Germany); Ohlsdorf POW cemetery near Hamburg (Germany); Suedfriedhof POW cemetery near Cologne (Germany); Zehrensdorf POW cemetery near Brandenburg (Germany).

Public or notable private war memorials by Lorimer include: Gullane; Bowden, Scottish Borders; Border Regiment Memorial in Carlisle Cathedral; Harrow School; 1st and 5th Battalions Royal Scots and RAMC memorials in St Giles Cathedral in Edinburgh; 90th Light Infantry in Perth; Arbroath Academy, Caddonfoot; Carnbee; Clackmannan; Currie; Gairloch, Gargunnock; Parliament House (advocates memorial) in Edinburgh; Selkirk; St Andrews; Garelochhead; Lake Dorian in North Macedonia; Alloa; Carlisle; Dirleton; Glenelg; Markinch; Merton College in Oxford; Newport, Monmouthshire; Pencaitland; Plymouth; Portsmouth; Urquhart; Westminster School; Wisley; Culross; Colinsburgh; Edinburgh City Chambers; Galston; Humbie; Inveresk; Lower Largo; Melrose, Scottish Borders; Newport-on-Tay; Penicuik; Spott; Kew Gardeners Memorial (St Lukes in Kew); Stenton; Whitekirk; Woolhampton; Kelso, Scottish Borders; GSWR memorials in Ayr and Glasgow; Strathblane; Colmonell; Paisley (with sculpture by Alice Meredith Williams); Queenstown, Eastern Cape in South Africa (with sculpture by Alice Meredith Williams); Waterford (Eire); Lerwick; Shetland.

== Freemasonry ==
He was initiated into Scottish Freemasonry in Lodge Holyrood House (St Luke's), No.44 on 8 March 1916.

== Selected list of works ==
- Ellary House, Ellary, Argyllshire (1894-98) restoration and alterations
- Stronachullan Lodge, Inverneill, Argyllshire (1894-96)
- Earlshall, Fife (1895) restoration
- Balvarran, Perthshire (1895)
- Svenska Klubben, Helsinki, Finland (1901)
- Lochhead House (Ceannloch House) Achahoish, Argyllshire (1901) alterations and extensions
- Rowallan, Ayrshire (1902)
- Hill of Tarvit, Fife (1904)
- Ardkinglas (1906-08)
- St Peter's Morningside, Edinburgh (was built from 1906 to 1907, and the nave 1928 to 1929) it is a category A listed building
- Ichrachan House, Taynuilt, Argyllshire (1908)
- Monzie Castle Perth and Kinross (1909-13) restoration
- Harmeny House in Balerno
- Thistle Chapel in St Giles Cathedral, Edinburgh (1909–1911)
- Dunderave Castle, Argyllshire, (1911-12) restoration
- Dunblane Cathedral (1912-14) furnishing and restoration
- Inverawe House, Taynuilt, Argyllshire (1913-14) remodelling
- St John's Kirk, Perth (addition of a memorial to those lost in World War I)
- Scottish National War Memorial, in Edinburgh Castle (1923–28)
- Galashiels War Memorial and Burgh Buildings (1923-27)
- Puck's Hut, Benmore House, Argyllshire (1928)
- The Chapel, Stowe School (1928)
- Strone House, Cairndow, Argyllshire (1930)
