= Knightswood St Margaret's Parish Church =

Knightswood St Margaret's Church
- Knightswood St Margaret's Parish Church
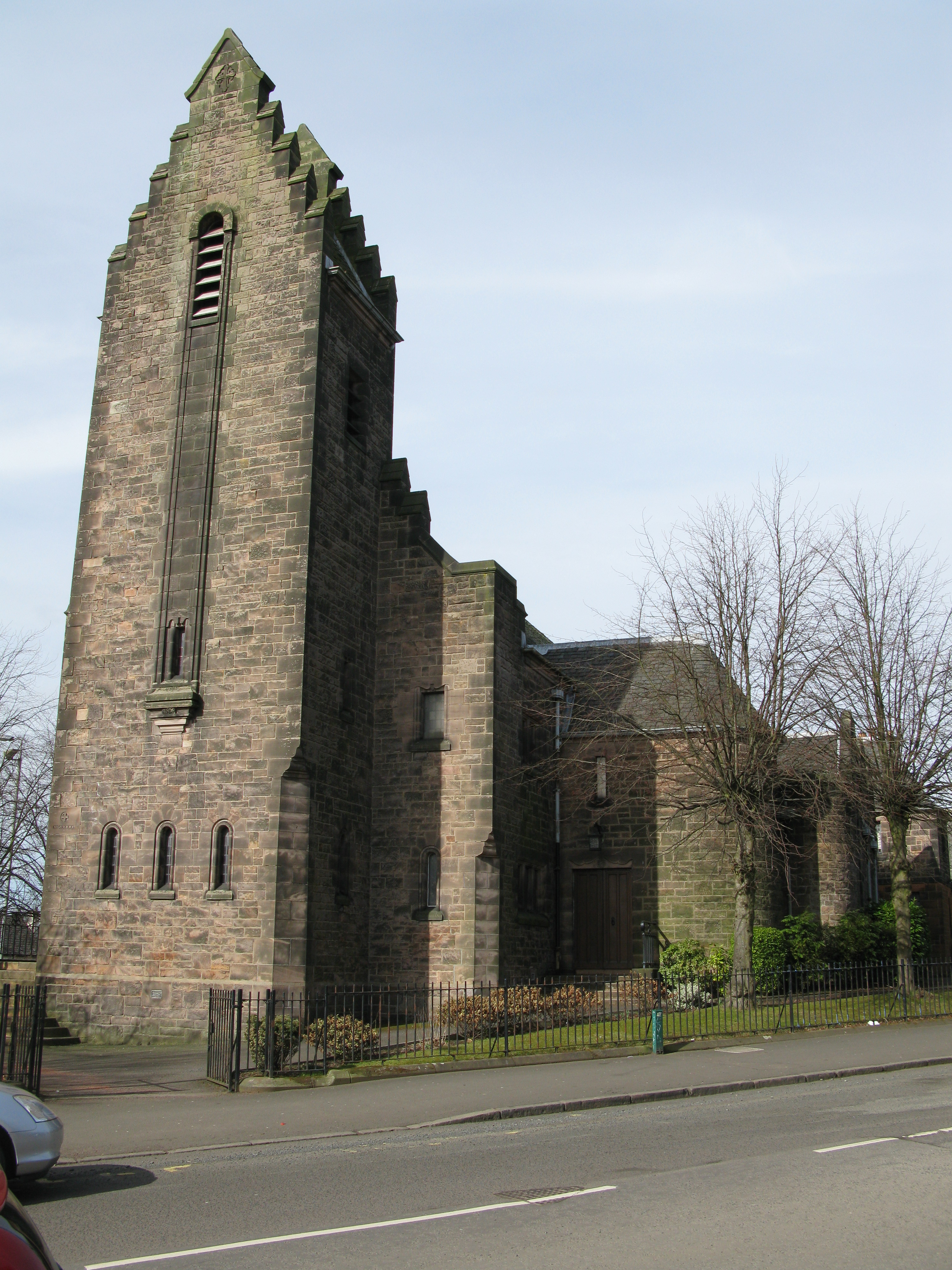
- Knightswood St Margaret's Church
- 55°53′42″N 4°20′30″W
- Location: Glasgow
- Country: Scotland
- Denomination: Church of Scotland
- Website: Church website

History
- Status: Active
- Founded: 1925
- Dedicated: 2 April 1932

Architecture
- Functional status: Parish church
- Architect: Robert Lorimer
- Architectural type: Church
- Years built: 1928-1932
- Groundbreaking: 1928

Specifications
- Materials: Stone

Listed Building – Category B
- Designated: 15 December 1970
- Reference no.: LB32274

Knightswood St. Margaret's Parish Church is a parish church of the Church of Scotland, previously serving part of the Knightswood area of Glasgow, Scotland.

== History ==
The church was planned by the Church of Scotland's Presbytery of Dumbarton in response to the plans of Glasgow Corporation to build a large new housing estate in the area. It was then separated from the parishes of Temple and Drumchapel, both daughter parishes in turn from New Kilpatrick in Bearsden which had previously overseen the area when it was rural.

The church is located at 2000 Great Western Road. The church hall was opened in 1925 and was used as the church for the first seven years. The current church was designed by the architect Sir Robert Lorimer and was dedicated in 1932. It is built entirely of stone, the last stone church to be built in Scotland; Lorimer died before it was completed.

The organ in the rear gallery is by Henry Willis, an outstanding instrument of national importance. Built in 1865 for Towhead Parish Church, it was rescued from demolition and moved to St Margaret's in 2002.

There are some excellent stained glass windows in the chancel (Alexander Russell 1957) and the entrance porch (St Margaret by Herbert Hendrie 1932).

== Closure ==
St Margaret's Church closed in September 2024, and the congregation was united with Annieland Temple and St David's Knightswood to form Knightswood Anniesland Trinity Church. The future of the building and the organ is currently (April 2025) uncertain.

== Ministry ==
The congregation was part of the Church of Scotland's Presbytery of Glasgow and was left vacant following the retiral of the Rev Sandy Fraser. The previous minister, the Rev Adam Dillon, left to be minister of St David's Memorial Park in Kirkintilloch.

Another former minister (1977–1989) was the Very Rev Dr David Lacy, who was Moderator of the General Assembly of the Church of Scotland in 2005–2006.

== See also ==
- List of Church of Scotland parishes
- St. John's Renfield Church, Glasgow – another nearby Church of Scotland congregation
