= Morris Meredith Williams =

Welsh painter and illustrator (1881–1973)

Morris Meredith Williams (1881–1973) was a British painter and illustrator.

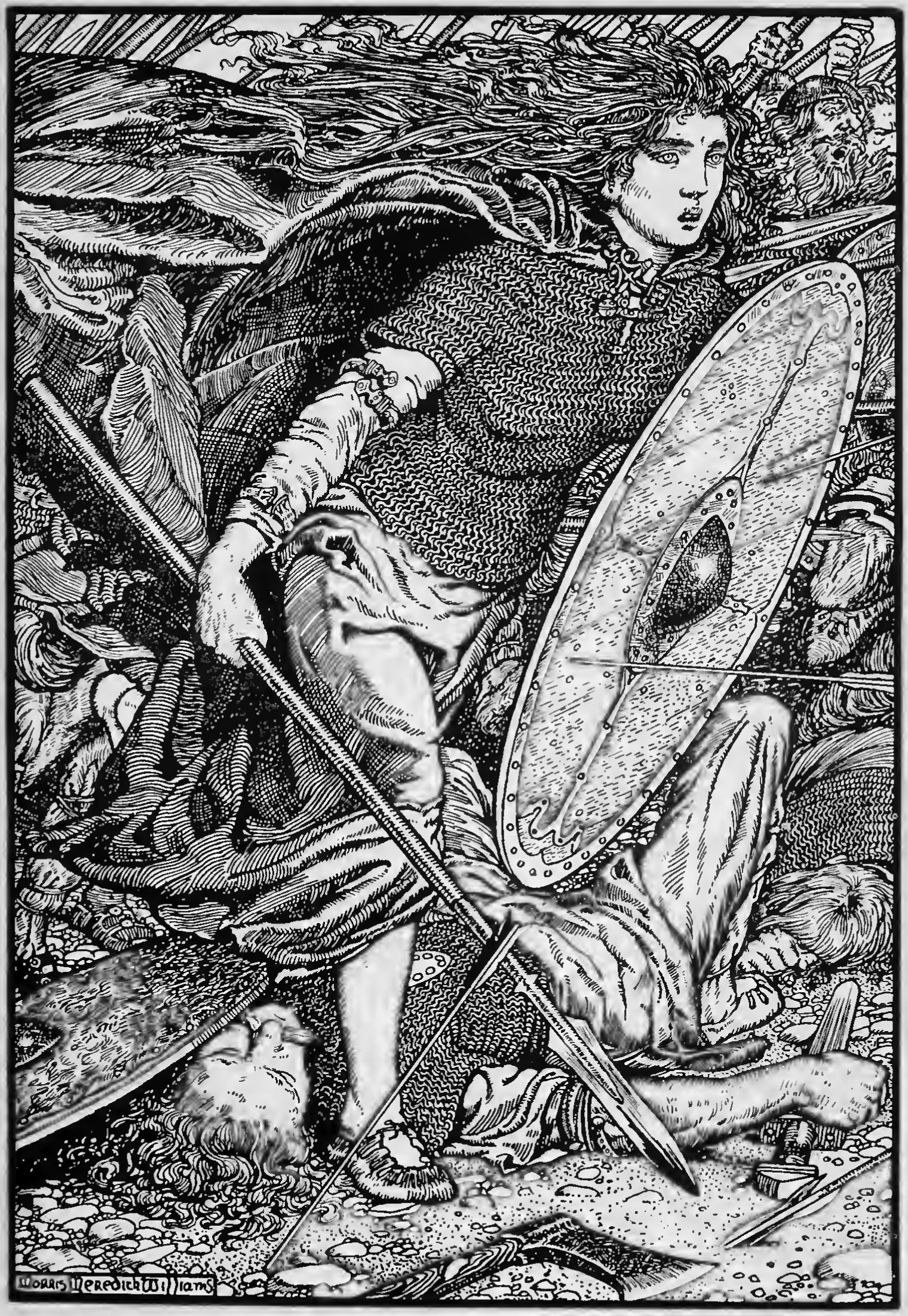
Lathgertha by Morris Meredith Williams

== Life ==
Williams was born in Cowbridge, Wales, the eldest child of Reverend M. P. Williams, at that time headmaster of Cowbridge Grammar School. The family moved in 1889 to Rotherfield Peppard near Henley-on-Thames when Reverend Williams became Rector there. Morris studied at the Slade School of Fine Art in London.

He continued his studies in Paris, where he met his first wife, the noted sculptor Alice Meredith Williams. They married in 1906 and lived in Edinburgh where Morris worked part-time as an Art Master at Fettes College and as an artist and prolific illustrator of children's books of myth, folklore and history. He served as an officer in the Welsh Regiment and The Royal Engineers in the First World War, and during this time drew many sketches of trench life and battlefield destruction, some of which were worked up into paintings after the war and now hang in regimental museums and in the National Army Museum. In 2017 a selection of his wartime work was published along with the couple's wartime correspondence.

After the war, he and Alice worked together on many war memorials. Morris designed the metal frieze of naval and military figures, modelled by Alice, for the shrine of the Scottish National War Memorial at Edinburgh Castle.

In 1929, the couple relocated to Devon, living in and around North Tawton. Alice died in 1934 and Williams remarried in 1936, remaining in Devon for the rest of his life and ending his days in Romansleigh in North Devon.

Williams worked in landscape and genre painting, stained glass, engraving and illustration. He exhibited at the Royal Academy in London and at the Royal Scottish Academy. Several of his works are held by museums and galleries in Liverpool and by National Galleries of Scotland.
