= James Maitland Hog =

Scottish landowner and elder

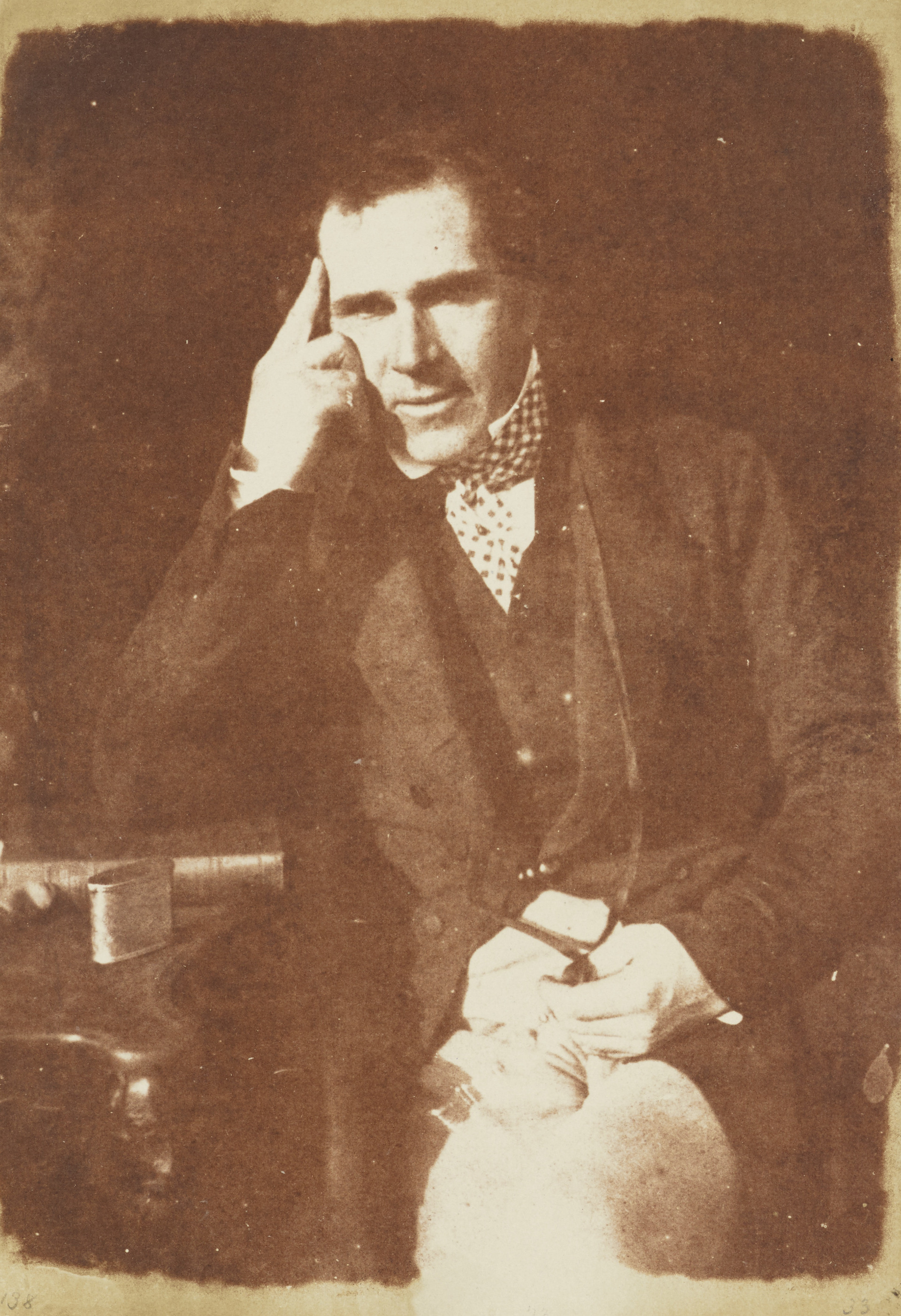
- James Maitland Hog by Hill & Adamson

Personal details
- Born: 7 August 1799
- Died: 1 August 1858 (aged 58)

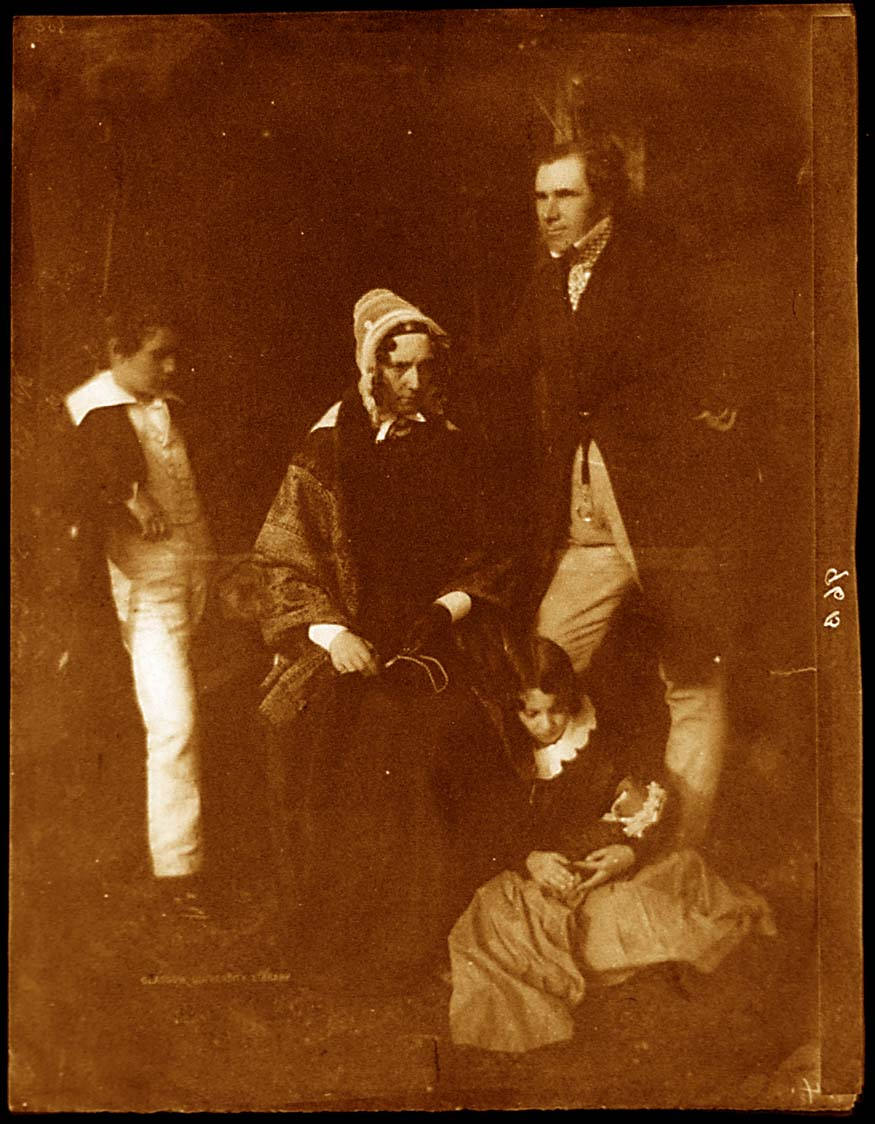
James Maitland Hog and family by Hill & Adamson

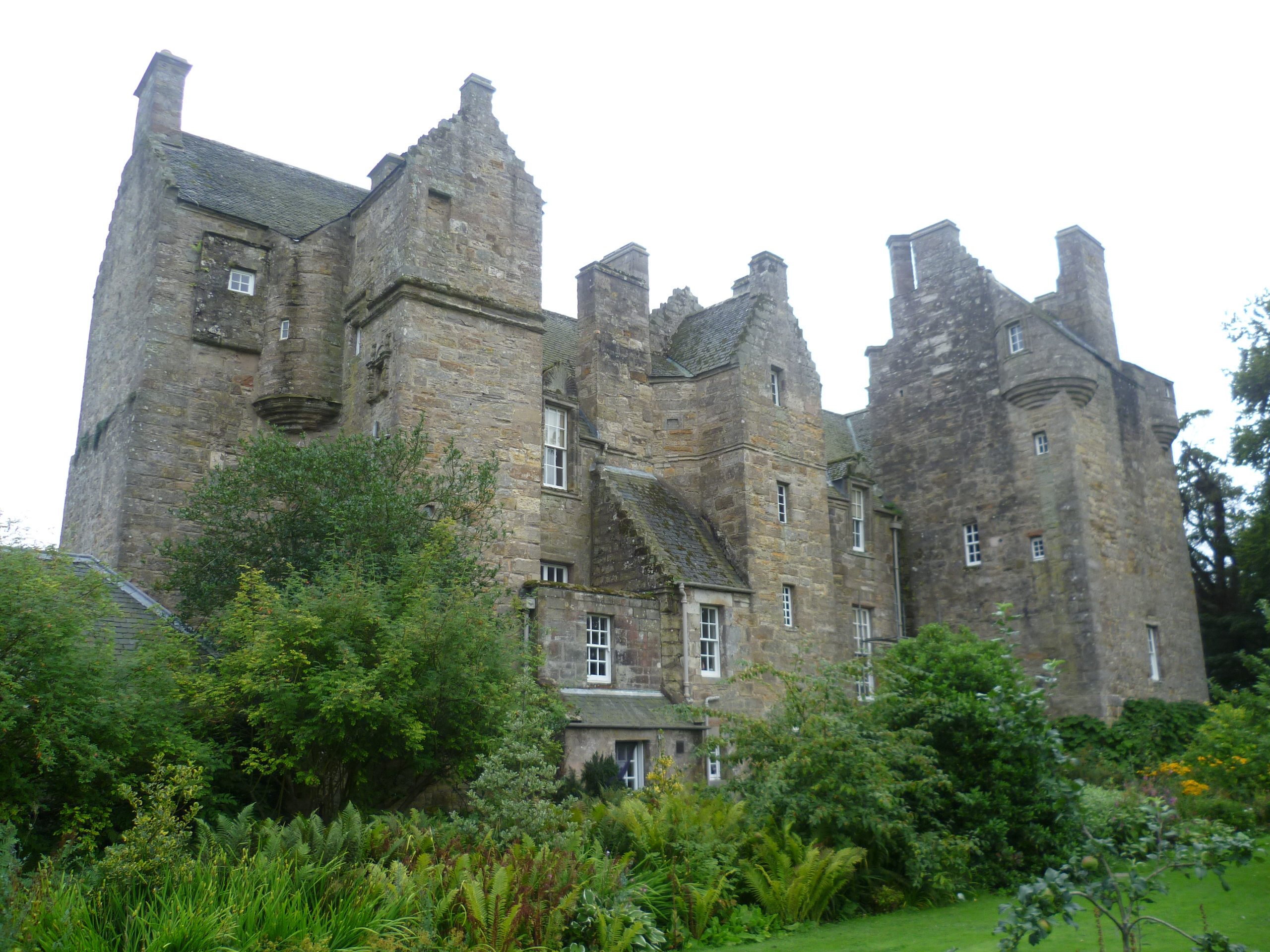
Kellie Castle

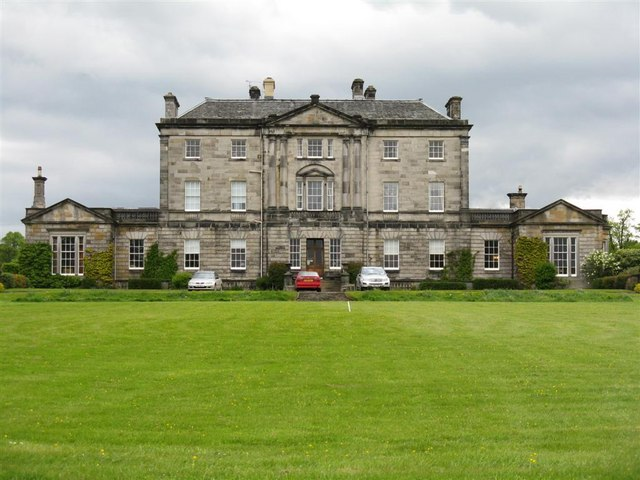
Newliston House

James Maitland Hog of Newliston and Kellie FRSE DL (7 August 1799 – 1 August 1858) was a Scottish advocate and landowner. He owned Newliston House and its estates, an impressive mansion by Robert Adam.

== Early life ==
James Maitland Hog, of Newliston and Kellie, was born on 7 August 1799. He was the son of Thomas Hog of Newliston (1742–1827) and his second wife, Mary Stuart (following the death of Lady Penelope-Madan Maitland). He was baptised at Kirkliston Parish Church on 25 August. He studied at the University of Edinburgh and became an advocate in 1822; but being in independent circumstances, he did not long continue to practise.

He appears to have inherited Kellie Castle in Fife in 1829 but made little use of the property, which was largely left to fall into disrepair. The castle later became the home of Prof James Lorimer and his sons Robert Lorimer and John Henry Lorimer.

== Inheritance and the ten years conflict ==
He resided for some time on a small estate called Muirestone, near Edinburgh; but in 1834, on the death of his brother, whom he succeeded, removed to Newliston. Mr Hog was decidedly pious; his tastes even when a boy were religious. Attending the ministry of Robert Gordon in Edinburgh, he seems to have profited thereby above many. Before he turned 30, he was set apart as an elder in the Church of Scotland. Evangelical Christianity was then rising in influence among the people, and progressing in the councils of the church. One sign of the times was the sending of Alexander Duff as the first Missionary of the Scottish Church to India. Another was the great effort made by Thomas Chalmers to provide 200 additional churches for the people of Scotland. Mr Hog was then taking an active part in ecclesiastical matters, and was appointed a member of Chalmers' "Non-intrusion Committee." He was the very first to suggest the immediate commencement of a subscription, and the second to put down his own name for a liberal sum. Hog accompanied Chalmers on some of his tours throughout Scotland. During the first year £200,000 was subscribed, and only a few years elapsed before the 200 churches were erected and supplied.

About that time, however, being constitutionally "conservative" and cautious, and having taken alarm at what appeared to him to be rash, or prematurely exacting, in the demands of the Committee, he was one of a small minority who retired, and thus kept themselves uncommitted by any of the subsequent negotiations. For so doing, he lost his seat in the General Assembly of 1842; the Presbytery of Linlithgow, which for several years he had represented, withdrawing from him for the time their confidence, and returning a more decided non-intrusionist in his stead.

== At the Disruption ==
Mr Hog was among the very last to be convinced that the case of the Church was hopeless. He clung to the persuasion that Lord Aberdeen meant bona fide to acknowledge the Church's jurisdiction, and that Sir George Sinclair's clause might have done. He could not bring himself to believe that the Conservative Government was capable of so destructive a deed as the breaking up of the Establishment. He refused to admit that a Disruption was inevitable, until it had actually taken place. And even then he tried to persuade himself that it was premature, or that the breach was not irreparable. It was not till a week or more had elapsed, till the two General Assemblies had got through the greater part of their business, till the Deed of Demission had been signed, and the separation was complete, that he finally made up his mind.

When the crisis came in 1843, Mr Hog was most unwilling to break off from the Establishment, he had clung to the hope that something would be done by the Government which would allow him to remain. But at last he decided to join the Free Church. He was slow in coming to a decision; but he was firm in adherence to conscientious convictions. All acknowledged the sincerity of Mr Hog, who never made enemies of those from whom he was constrained to differ.

He erected, at his own expense, a church in his parish, and ably supported it. He also largely contributed to the erection of a church and school at Arncroach, in the parish of Carubee, in which parish his estate of Kellie lay, and whereon his numerous feuars resided. He entered with great earnestness into the various schemes by which the Free Church has consolidated the maintenance of her ministry, the education of her children, the training of her students and teachers, and missionary operations at home and abroad. By his influence bursaries were provided for deserving young men, and a fund secured which will perpetuate the benefit. He originated a scheme for the liquidation of all debt upon churches, manses, and schools, belonging to the Free Church; and had the satisfaction to learn before he died, that the sum necessary to supplement congregational exertion, viz., £50,000, had been all subscribed. The difficult task of securing sites for churches from reluctant proprietors, was conducted by him for several years, requiring delicate and extensive correspondence; and he was successful with all but one or two.

== Other interests ==
In 1853 he was elected a Fellow of the Royal Society of Edinburgh his proposer being James Thomson Gibson-Craig.

== Illness and death ==
Two years before his death, a very severe and painful disease began to undermine his health. His complaint was a creeping palsy. During this period he committed to paper many of his thoughts on religious subjects. His speech was much affected, and he could not enjoy conversation. But writing gave him relief, though even that was performed with great difficulty. On some days he would write as many as twenty-four folio pages, and never a day passed without his writing less or more. Most of these compositions referred to his spiritual conflicts, which were singular and severe. Mr Hog loved the ordinances of God, and even in his affliction was wheeled to church as long as ho was able. When that was too much for his weakness, he instituted a private chapel in Newliston House, where, once a week, the ordinary services of the community to which he belonged were conducted by a neighbouring minister. Lest any circumstances might affect the maintenance of religious ordinances in his parish, he made provision, a short time before his death, for perpetuating his personal contribution for the support of the ministry.

In his last days Mr Hog was unable to speak or write. But by means of a little tube or reed in his mouth, he pointed to the letters of a printed alphabet before him.

On Sunday, 1 August 1858, he died, aged 58. He was interred in the burying-ground attached to the church of Kirkliston, where he had selected for himself a resting-place about two years before, in preference to the ancient family vault close by, which had heretofore been used.

== Family ==
In 1827 he married Helen Maitland Gibson, daughter of Sir Alexander Charles Maitland, baronet of Clifton Hall. They had one son, Thomas Alexander Hog (1835–1908).

His sister, Rachel Elisabeth Hog, married Patrick Fraser Tytler FRSE.
