= List of listed buildings in Carnbee, Fife =

This is a list of listed buildings in the parish of Carnbee in Fife, Scotland.

== List ==
| Name | Location | Date listed | Grid ref. (Note: Sometimes known as OSGB36, the grid reference (where provided) is based on the British national grid reference system used by the Ordnance Survey. • "Guide to National Grid". Ordnance Survey. • "Get-a-map". Ordnance Survey.) | Geo-coordinates | Notes | LB number (Note: Historic Environment Scotland assign a unique alphanumeric identifier to each designated site in Scotland, for listed buildings this always begins with "LB", for example "LB12345".) | Image |
|---|---|---|---|---|---|---|---|
| Arncroach Village Main Road. Lundie Cottage, Garden Wall And Gates | | | | 56°14′10″N 2°47′09″W | Category B | 2502 | Upload Photo |
| Balcormo Farm Gatepiers | | | | 56°13′46″N 2°47′04″W | Category C(S) | 2510 | Upload Photo |
| Balcormo House Gatepiers | | | | 56°13′47″N 2°46′54″W | Category B | 2511 | Upload Photo |
| Carnbee Village Carnbee Parish Church, Cemetery, Walls & Gatepiers | | | | 56°14′56″N 2°45′27″W | Category B | 2512 | Upload another image See more images |
| Dreel House (Former Free Kirk Manse) And Former Stable Block | | | | 56°14′21″N 2°47′38″W | Category C(S) | 2515 | Upload Photo |
| Comielaw Farmhouse And Steading | | | | 56°13′52″N 2°46′28″W | Category B | 4308 | Upload Photo |
| South Cassingray Farmhouse | | | | 56°15′26″N 2°50′00″W | Category C(S) | 2540 | Upload Photo |
| Balcaskie House | | | | 56°13′21″N 2°46′05″W | Category A | 2503 | Upload another image |
| Balcaskie House, Terraced Garden | | | | 56°13′18″N 2°46′03″W | Category A | 2504 | Upload another image |
| Kellie Castle, Stable Courtyard and Walled Garden | | | | 56°14′15″N 2°46′32″W | Category A | 2519 | Upload another image See more images |
| Arncroach Village Main Road W. Stewart | | | | 56°14′10″N 2°47′12″W | Category C(S) | 2528 | Upload Photo |
| Balcaskie House: Bridge On West Drive | | | | 56°13′22″N 2°46′25″W | Category B | 2508 | Upload another image |
| Gibliston House Former Stable Block | | | | 56°14′09″N 2°48′43″W | Category C(S) | 2517 | Upload Photo |
| Gillingshill House | | | | 56°14′48″N 2°47′22″W | Category B | 2518 | Upload Photo |
| Kellie Castle, Kellie Mausoleum | | | | 56°14′06″N 2°46′41″W | Category C(S) | 4309 | Upload Photo |
| Balcaskie House East Gatepiers And Twin Dovecots | | | | 56°13′31″N 2°45′33″W | Category A | 2506 | Upload another image |
| Carnbee Village War Memorial | | | | 56°14′57″N 2°45′30″W | Category B | 2514 | Upload another image |
| Balcaskie House: North Drive Gatepiers | | | | 56°13′32″N 2°46′15″W | Category B | 2507 | Upload another image |
| Arncroach Village Main Road Old Free Church | | | | 56°14′08″N 2°47′09″W | Category B | 2501 | Upload another image |
| Balcaskie House: Home Farm | | | | 56°13′24″N 2°45′54″W | Category C(S) | 2509 | Upload Photo |
| Balcaskie House, East Lodge | | | | 56°13′30″N 2°45′33″W | Category B | 2505 | Upload Photo |
| Kellie Castle Gatepiers | | | | 56°14′08″N 2°46′37″W | Category C(S) | 2520 | Upload another image |
| Newton Of Balcormo Hutcheson And J Blyde | | | | 56°13′57″N 2°46′41″W | Category B | 2521 | Upload Photo |
| Gibliston House | | | | 56°14′05″N 2°48′41″W | Category A | 155 | Upload Photo |
| Carnbee Village Carnbee House (Formerly Carnbee Manse) | | | | 56°14′49″N 2°45′24″W | Category B | 2513 | Upload Photo |
| Gibliston Farmhouse And Steading | | | | 56°14′22″N 2°49′04″W | Category B | 2516 | Upload Photo |
| Arncroach Village Blinkbonny Road/Main Road Corner House | | | | 56°14′10″N 2°47′12″W | Category B | 2527 | Upload Photo |

== Key ==
The scheme for classifying buildings in Scotland is:

- Category A: "buildings of national or international importance, either architectural or historic; or fine, little-altered examples of some particular period, style or building type."
- Category B: "buildings of regional or more than local importance; or major examples of some particular period, style or building type, which may have been altered."
- Category C: "buildings of local importance; lesser examples of any period, style, or building type, as originally constructed or moderately altered; and simple traditional buildings which group well with other listed buildings."

In March 2016 there were 47,288 listed buildings in Scotland. Of these, 8% were Category A, and 50% were Category B, with the remaining 42% being Category C.

== See also ==
- List of listed buildings in Fife
