= Everard im Thurn =

British colonial administrator, explorer and author (1852–1932)

Sir Everard Ferdinand im Thurn KCMG KBE CB FRAI

8th Governor of Fiji
- In office 11 October 1904 – 21 February 1911
- Preceded by: Sir Henry Jackson
- Succeeded by: Sir Francis May

7th High Commissioner for the Western Pacific
- In office 11 October 1904 – 21 February 1911
- Monarchs: Edward VII, George V
- Preceded by: Sir Henry Jackson
- Succeeded by: Sir Francis May

Acting Governor of British Ceylon
- In office 19 November 1903 – 3 December 1903
- Monarch: Edward VII
- Preceded by: Joseph West Ridgeway
- Succeeded by: Henry Arthur Blake

Personal details
- Born: 9 May 1852 Camberwell, London, England
- Died: 9 October 1932 (aged 80)
- Spouse: Hannah Cassels Lorimer, Lady im Thurn
- Education: University of Edinburgh

Sir Everard Ferdinand im Thurn KCMG KBE CB FRAI (9 May 1852 – 9 October 1932) was an author, explorer, botanist, photographer and British colonial administrator. He was Governor of Fiji in the years 1904–1910.

== Life ==
Im Thurn was born in Camberwell, London, the son of a Swiss immigrant banker, and educated at Marlborough College, University of Oxford, the University of Edinburgh, and the University of Sydney. His first book, dedicated to his headmaster, was a study of The Birds of Marlborough (1870).

After his education, im Thurn travelled to British Guiana—called Guyana since its independence from Great Britain—to become (at the age of 25) curator of the British Guiana Museum from 1877 until 1882. He later became a stipendiary magistrate in Pomeroon.

In December 1884 he led the first successful expedition to the summit of Mount Roraima, in Venezuela's Gran Sabana region, along with Harry Perkins, an Assistant Crown Surveyor who was also living in British Guiana. He was a keen photographer and author of several works related to his expedition to Roraima, which were published in scientific journals, including: "The Botany of Roraima Expedition of 1884: being notes on the plants observed; with a list of the species collected, and determinations of those that are new" (Linnean Society, 1887), and "Among the Indians of Guiana: being sketches, chiefly anthropologic from the interior of British Guiana, etc.", which includes detailed observations of the Pemon Indians of Venezuela. Im Thurn went on to become a government agent in British Guiana from 1891 to 1899, and was employed on the Venezuelan boundary commission 1897–99, for which he was appointed a Companion of the Order of the Bath (CB) in the 1900 New Year Honours list on 1 January 1900 (the order was gazetted on 16 January 1900), and was invested by Queen Victoria at Windsor Castle on 1 March 1900.

He then spent a couple of years back in the United Kingdom, holding several positions from 1899 to 1901, including 1st class clerk and later principal clerk in the Colonial Office. In July 1901 he moved to Ceylon (now Sri Lanka), where he was appointed colonial secretary and lieutenant-governor. He ended his colonial career as Governor of Fiji from 1904 to 1910, during which time he was knighted as a Knight Commander of the Order of St Michael and St George (KCMG) in the 1905 Birthday Honours. He was appointed a Knight Commander of the Order of the British Empire (KBE) in the 1918 New Year Honours, at which time he was vice-chairman of the King George and Queen Mary's Club for Overseas Forces.

He was a well-respected figure in the scientific circles of his time. Whilst in Ceylon he served as president of the Ceylon Branch of the Royal Asiatic Society from 1902 to 1904. He was later elected president of the Royal Anthropological Institute 1919–1920 and made an Honorary Fellow of Exeter College, Oxford.

In 1895, he married Hannah C. Lorimer, daughter of Professor James Lorimer, of the University of Edinburgh. In 1921 they moved to live at Cockenzie House in East Lothian, where he died in 1932.

In 1886, he was honoured by English botanist Henry Nicholas Ridley, who named a genus of plants from tropical South America after him: Everardia, in the family Cyperaceae.

The standard author abbreviation Thurn is used to indicate this person as the author when citing a botanical name.

Government offices
Preceded by Joseph West Ridgeway	Acting; Governor of Ceylon; 1903	Succeeded by Henry Arthur Blake
Preceded by Sir Henry Moore Jackson	High Commissioner for the Western Pacific; 1904–1911	Succeeded by Sir Francis Henry May
Preceded by Sir Henry Moore Jackson	Governor of Fiji; 1904–1911	Succeeded by Sir Francis Henry May
