= Hannah Cassels im Thurn =

British sculptor (1854-1947)

Lady Hannah im Thurn
- Born: Hannah Cassels Lorimer; 7 December 1854
- Died: 25 November 1947 (aged 92); Edinburgh, Scotland
- Education: Certificate in Art for Women: Moral Philosophy and Geology
- Alma mater: University of Edinburgh
- Known for: Natural history drawing and ethnographic sculpture
- Spouse: Sir Everard F. im Thurn
- Father: James Lorimer

Lady Hannah Cassels im Thurn (née Lorimer; 7 December 1854 – 25 November 1947) was a British botanical artist and ethnological sculptor best known for the collection of orchid illustrations attributed to her and held at the Royal Botanic Gardens, Kew.

== Biography ==
Lady Hannah im Thurn was born Hannah Cassels Lorimer on 7 December 1854. She was the daughter of Hannah (née Stodart) and James Lorimer. She studied at the University of Edinburgh where, in 1880, she was awarded the University Certificate of Arts for Women.

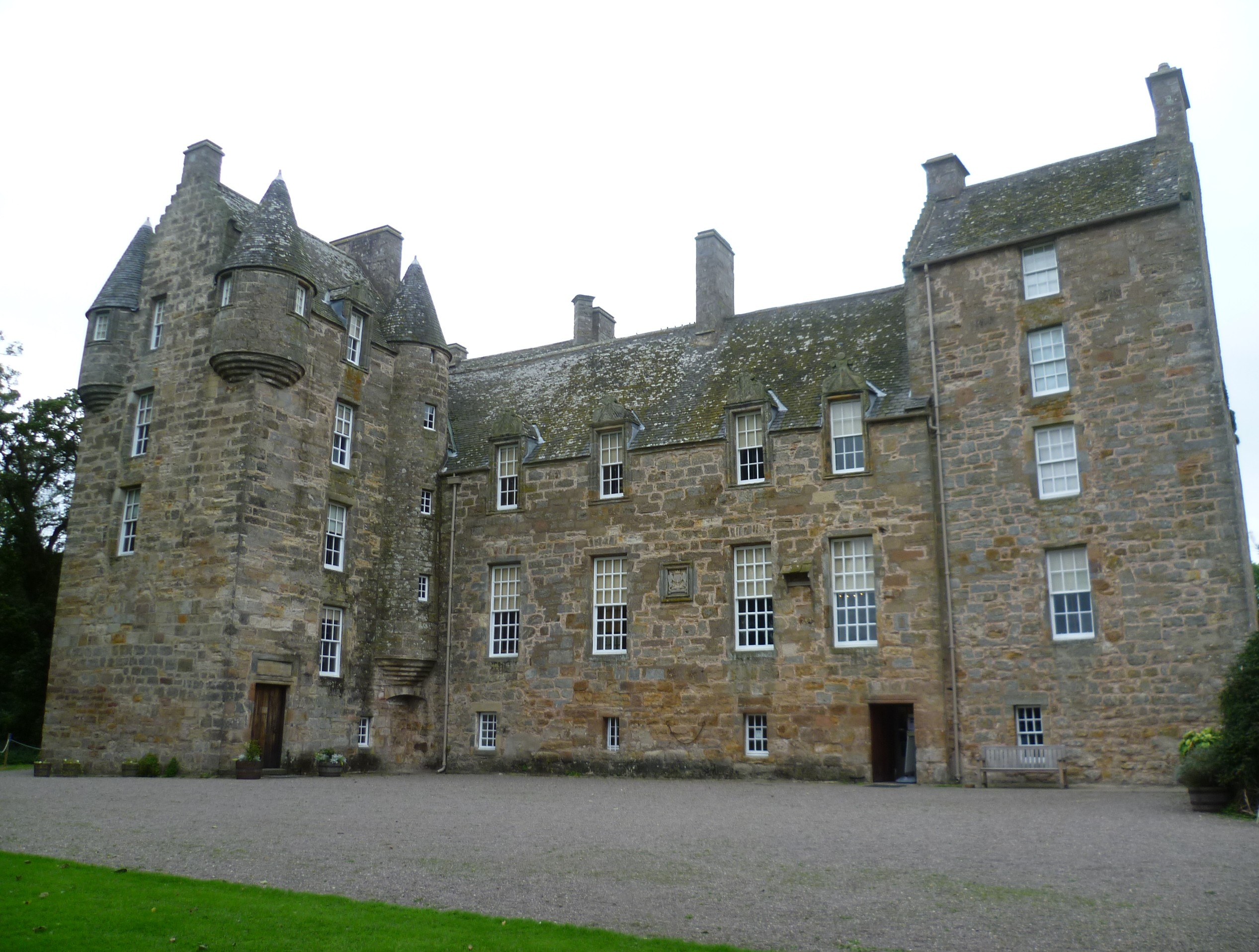
Kellie Castle

It was while renovations were being completed at her family home of Kellie Castle that she learned the skill of moulding plaster ceilings from the tradespeople employed by her father to renovate the castle. She subsequently worked on the moulded plaster ceilings of the Fife residence of Lord Bute. Paintings by im Thurn are owned by the National Trust of Scotland and are on display at Kellie Castle. Also at Kellie is a cast taken from an original bronze sculpture by Hannah of a Sri Lankan boy, given to Kellie by Hannah's niece Miss Esther Chalmers.

On 15 August 1895 she married Everard im Thurn and travelled with him to British Guiana. While in British Guiana im Thurn completed the orchid illustration collection now held at Kew and attributed to her.

im Thurn was also produced several plaster busts now held in various museums. These include a bust of a Macusi boy held in the British Museum but currently unidentified. In 1898 im Thurn donated a bust sculpted by her of a Warrau boy to the Pitt Rivers Museum. im Thurn also donated a bust of Warrau boy to the Guyana National Museum.

In 1912, she exhibited some of her paintings at the Royal Horticultural Society's show in Westminster.

Lady Hannah im Thurn died in Edinburgh on 25 November 1947.
