= Everardia =

Everardia may refer to:

- Everardia (bug), a genus of true bugs in the family Pentatomidae
- Everardia (plant), a genus of plants in the family Cyperaceae
