= Arncroach =

Village in Fife, Scotland

Coordinates: 56.23°N 02.79°W

Arncroach: Scottish Gaelic: Earrann na Croiche
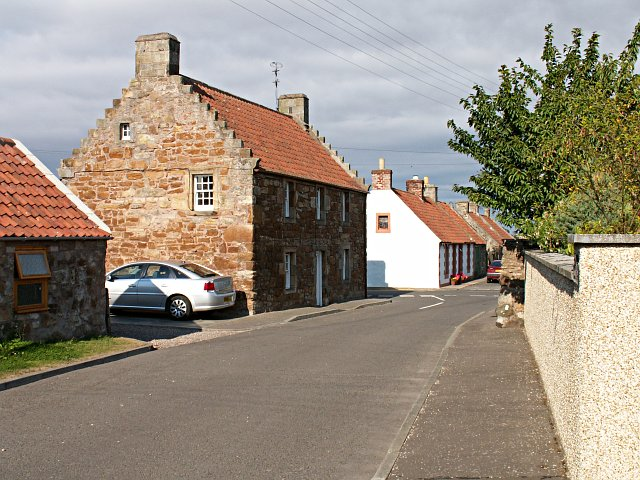
- Blinkbonny Road, Arncroach

- Location within Fife
- OS grid reference: NO5105
- Council area: Fife
- Lieutenancy area: Fife
- Country: Scotland
- Sovereign state: United Kingdom
- Post town: ANSTRUTHER
- Postcode district: KY10
- Dialling code: 01333
- Police: Scotland
- Fire: Scottish
- Ambulance: Scottish
- UK Parliament: North East Fife
- Scottish Parliament: North East Fife

Arncroach is a small village situated in the east of Fife, four miles inland of the fishing village of Pittenweem and around 10 miles away from St Andrews, on the east coast of Scotland. The name Arncroach derives from Scottish Gaelic ‘Height of the gallows’ (àird na croiche) or (less likely) ‘share (of land) of the gallows’ (earrann na croiche). The village green is named after Louise Lorimer. Arncroach is within the parish of Carnbee. Situated about 1/4 of a mile from Arncroach is Kellie Castle, formerly the seat of the Earl of Kellie, and is also where the famous Lorimer family lived. The village saw the installation of the first wind turbine in the East Neuk area of Fife, directly adjacent to the Gillingshill Nature Reserve.

== Geology and geography ==
Arncroach is situated at the foot of Kellie Law, a small hill which is visible from the Firth of Forth. The village has a population of around 120 people.

== Notable residents ==
Furniture maker, William Wheeler of Arncroach. Designer and maker of Chippendale and Gossip Chairs circa 1880.

== Education ==
Arncroach once had two schools, despite it only being a very small village. One was a boys' school and the other was for girls. Later they were combined, as having two became impractical. The Old School of Arncroach closed in the late 1980s and was bought and used as a manufacturing business before being converted into a residential home in 1993. Children living in the village and surrounding area now have to travel to Pittenweem or Colinsburgh Primarys, and Waid Academy in Anstruther for secondary education.
