= Robert Hamilton (advocate) =

Scottish lawyer (1763–1831)

Robert Hamilton FRSE (19 April 1763 – 13 December 1831) was a Scottish advocate and close friend of Sir Walter Scott. Enjoying boat trips and other excursions together, Scott termed him Our Lord High Admiral Hamilton in his diaries. He is noted as a gourmand and suffered repeatedly from gout.

== Life ==
Hamilton was born on 19 April 1763 one of 11 children to Alexander Hamilton of Gilkerscleugh near Crawfordjohn in Lanarkshire, and his wife Margaret (nee MacQueen).

He trained in law at the University of Edinburgh under John Millar, qualifying as an advocate in 1788. In 1796 he purchased (sic) from Allan Maconochie, Lord Meadowbank the chair of Professor of Public Law at the University. He never lectured, as was standard in this role at that time, which was largely titular, but held it until death, receiving £200 per annum for the title. From 1797 to 1822 he served as Sheriff of Lanark. From 1822 he served as Principal Clerk of Session in the High Court.

In 1795 he was elected a Fellow of the Royal Society of Edinburgh. His proposers were Allan Maconochie, Lord Meadowbank, William Wright, and Alexander Keith of Ravelston. In 1799 he successfully pursued William Hamilton of Wishart’s claim to the title of Lord Belhaven.

He lived at 7 Hope Street, just off Charlotte Square in Edinburgh.

He died on 13 December 1831 and is buried in Greyfriars Kirkyard in Edinburgh.

On his death his professorship was not refilled. The post was not recreated until 1867 when Professor James Lorimer took on the role.

== Family ==
In 1804 he married Janet Hamilton Anderson (died 1871), whose stepmother had been Sir Walter Scott's childhood sweetheart. They had no children.
