= Duncan Dundas of Newliston =

The heraldic achievement of the Office of the Lord Lyon King of Arms.

Duncan Dundas of Newliston was Lord Lyon King of Arms of Scotland from 1450 until 1490. The second son of James Dundas of that Ilk, Duncan was much noted in his time and was frequently employed in embassies to England. He is said to have discharged his duty in those negotiations "with integrity and honour". He acquired the feudal barony of Newliston, and founded a branch of the Dundas family there, the Dundases of Newliston.

Duncan's arms were the arms of his father (Argent, a Lion rampant Gules armed and langued Azure), with the addition of a crescent in the dexter-chief corner, as the mark of a second son.

== Arms ==
Coat of arms of Duncan Dundas of Newliston
Escutcheon Argent a lion rampant a crescent for difference all gules

Heraldic offices
Preceded by Alexander Nairne of Sandford	Lord Lyon King of Arms; 1450–1490	Succeeded by Henry Thomson
