= Peter Hately Waddell =

Scottish cleric and author

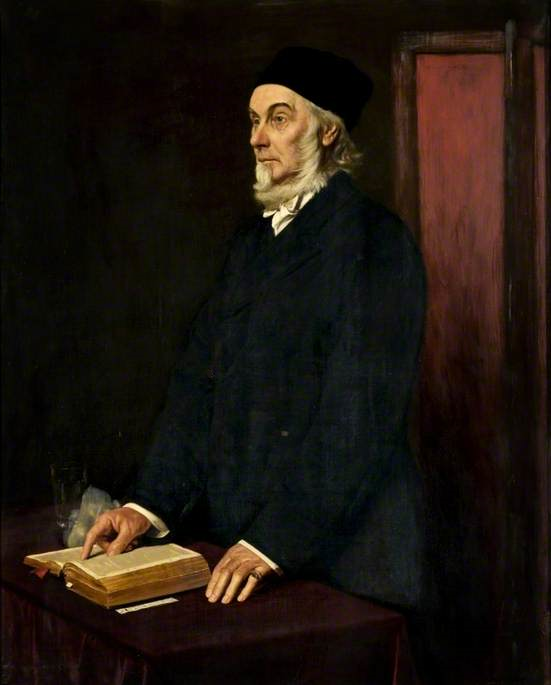
Portrait of Waddell by John Henry Lorimer

Peter Hately Waddell (19 May 1817 – 5 May 1891) was a Scottish cleric and prolific writer. He founded a congregation he called the Church of the Future. He also wrote widely on aspects of Scottish culture and ancient Celtic history, sometimes espousing distinctly non-mainstream views.

== Life ==
Waddell was the son of James Waddell of Balquhatston, and was born at Balquhatston House, Slamannan, Stirlingshire on 19 May 1817. His father soon afterwards disposed of the property and removed to Glasgow, where Waddell attended high school and the University of Glasgow. He was a student of divinity at the time of the disruption of 1843 of the Church of Scotland, and then cast in his lot with the seceders, who afterwards formed the Free Church of Scotland. Having been licensed as a preacher, in 1843 he was ordained as minister of Rhynie, Aberdeenshire, and in the following year he removed to Girvan, Ayrshire, to the pastorate of a small free-church congregation. His attachment to the free church was loosened when he found that its members intended to retain in the entirety the rigid definitions contained in the Westminster Confession of Faith. He had outgrown his early Calvinistic training; finding himself at variance with the church of his adoption, he voluntarily resigned his charge and founded an independent chapel at Girvan styled ‘the Church of the Future,’ defining his aims and intentions in a discourse with the same title, published in Glasgow in 1861. Many of his congregation left the free church and joined with him. Waddell remained at Girvan till 1862, when he went to Glasgow, and began preaching in the city hall as an independent minister. He soon gathered a large congregation, and in 1870 a church was erected for him in East Howard Street, Glasgow. Financial difficulties led to the abandonment of this building, and Waddell once more gathered a congregation by preaching in the Glasgow Trades Hall. In 1888, at the request of friends and adherents, he joined the established church. Advancing years compelled him to retire from the ministry in October 1890; he then began to make selections from his published works to form a volume. The task was not completed when his death took place at Ashton Terrace, Dowanhill, on 5 May 1891. He graduated D.D. from an American university.

== Works ==
Waddell was an orator of very exceptional power. His skill as a dialectician was displayed in a series of lectures on Ernest Renan's Life of Jesus, delivered in Glasgow City Hall before large audiences in 1863, and afterwards published. His profound admiration for Robert Burns led to his issuing a new edition of the poems with an elaborate criticism (Glasgow, 1867–9, 4to). He presided at the meeting held in Burns' cottage on 25 January 1859 in celebration of the poet's birth, and then delivered an impassioned eulogy on Burns.

His chief historical work was a volume entitled Ossian and the Clyde, in which he sought to confirm the authenticity of the Ossianic poems by the identification of topographical references that could not be known to James Macpherson. He also claimed to have verified another work widely accepted to be a forgery, Roger O'Connor's Chronicles of Eri, which he said was "forgotten or treated with contempt as an imposture, but now capable of verification in all substantial respects". He also contributed a remarkable series of letters to a Glasgow journal on Ptolemy’s map of Egypt, showing that the discoveries of Speke and Grant had been foreshadowed by the old geographer. He took a keen interest in educational matters, and was a member of the first two school boards in Glasgow. His most original contribution to literature was a translation of the Psalms of David from Hebrew into the Scottish language, under the title The Psalms: frae Hebrew intil Scottis, in which he showed his profound linguistic knowledge. This work was followed in 1870 by a similar translation of Isaiah. In the early part of his career he attracted much notice by lectures which he delivered in London and the principal Scottish towns. Between 1882 and 1885 he edited the Waverley novels with notes and an introduction.

=== Own works ===
- Protestant delusion in the nineteenth century; being another letter of remonstrance (1843)
- The threefold mystery of life and death in the human soul; being the substance of a discourse; (1843)
- The sanctification of science; or, The application of the gospel to human learning: being an introductory lecture (1843)
- Orthodoxy is not evangelism: being a letter of remonstrance. By a probationer of the Church of Scotland [P.H. Waddell] (1843)
- The Girvan petitions; or The voluntary question in the Free Church (1844)
- Scheme of a confession of faith and Church government, adopted by a reforming Protestant congregation at Girvan
- The Sojourn of a Sceptic in the Land of Darkness and Uncertainty, (1847) Edinburgh:M. MacPhail, 16mo
- The Christ of Revelation and Reality, of Whose Fulness All We Have Received; Being a Series of Discourses ... (1863)
- Life and Works of Robert Burns: Critical and Analytical Edition, (1867, revised ed. 1870) 2 parts
- The Psalms: frae Hebrew intil Scottis (1871) Edinburgh, 4to
- Behold the Man: a Tragedy for the Closet, in five acts, (1872) Glasgow, 8vo (in verse)
- Ossian and the Clyde, (1875), Glasgow, 4to
- Isaiah: frae Hebrew intil Scottis (1879)
- Essays on Faith
- Christianity as an Ideal
- The Gospel of the Kingdom: A Contribution Towards a Liberal Theology (1892)
- (his son, of the same name:) Peter Hately Waddell, John Charles Gibson (1925) P. Hately Waddell, D. D., Minister of Whitekirk, East Lothian: Life and Letters with Extracts from His Works, published by Wylie and co., 1925

=== Lectures ===
- The baptism of letters; or The alphabet before the Bible: a pulpit oration (1857)
- Church of the Future; Arguments and Outlines: A Discourse, Founded on Philp. Iii. 7-16, Read in the City Hall, Glasgow, Sabbath, 8 December 1861
- The gospel in the Passion play of 1890. A lecture

=== Edited works ===
- Sir Walter Scott (1876) Waverley Novels, ed. Peter Hately Waddell. London:T. & A. Constable
