= Isaiah: frae Hebrew intil Scottis =

1879 translation of the Book of Isaiah

Isaiah: frae Hebrew intil Scottis is a translation of the Book of Isaiah into Scots by Peter Hately Waddell, first published in 1879. Like his earlier translation of the Psalms, the book is notable for being translated directly into Scots from an original biblical language, rather than from a pre-existing English translation.

Waddell uses rhyme to give an impression of the literary style of the original text.
