= The Psalms: frae Hebrew intil Scottis =

Scots translation of the book of Psalms

The Psalms: frae Hebrew intil Scottis is a translation of the book of Psalms into Scots by Peter Hately Waddell, first published in 1871. It is notable for being the first translation into Scots from an original biblical language rather than from a pre-existing English translation.

== Sample text ==
PSALM XXIII

The sheep-keepin o' the Lord's kind an' canny, wi' a braw howff at lang last: David keeps his sheep; the Lord keeps David.

Ane heigh-lilt o' David's.

THE LORD is my herd, nae want sal fa' me:

He louts me till lie amang green howes; he airts me atowre by the lown watirs:

He waukens my wa'-gaen saul; he weises me roun, for his ain name's sake, intil right roddins.

Na! tho' I gang thro' the dead-mirk-dail; e'en thar, sal I dread nae skaithin: for yersel are nar-by me; yer stock an' yer stay haud me baith fu' cheerie.

My buird ye hae hansell'd in face o' my faes; ye hae drookit my head wi' oyle; my bicker is fu' an' skailin.

E'en sae, sal gude-guidin an' gude-gree gang wi' me, ilk day o' my livin; an' evir mair syne, i' the LORD's ain howff, at lang last, sal I mak bydan.

== See also ==
- Isaiah: frae Hebrew intil Scottis
