= Cephalocarpus =

Scientific classification
- Kingdom: Plantae
- Clade: Embryophytes
- Clade: Tracheophytes
- Clade: Spermatophytes
- Clade: Angiosperms
- Clade: Monocots
- Clade: Commelinids
- Order: Poales
- Family: Cyperaceae
- Genus: Cephalocarpus; Nees (1842)

Synonyms
- Everardia Ridl. (1886); Pseudoeverardia Gilly (1951)

Genus of flowering plants

Cephalocarpus is a genus of flowering plants belonging to the family Cyperaceae. It includes 20 species of sedges native to tropical South America, ranging from Colombia and Peru to Venezuela, Guyana, Suriname, and northern Brazil.

The former genus Everardia is now considered a synonym. It was named in honour of Everard im Thurn (1852–1932), author, explorer, botanist, photographer and British colonial administrator,

== Species ==
20 species are accepted.

- Cephalocarpus angustus (N.E.Br.) S.M.Costa
- Cephalocarpus confertus Gilly
- Cephalocarpus debilis (T.Koyama & Maguire) S.M.Costa
- Cephalocarpus diffusus (T.Koyama & Maguire) S.M.Costa
- Cephalocarpus distichus (T.Koyama & Maguire) S.M.Costa
- Cephalocarpus dracaenula Nees
- Cephalocarpus duidae (Gilly) S.M.Costa
- Cephalocarpus erectolaxus (T.Koyama & Maguire) S.M.Costa
- Cephalocarpus flexifolium (Gilly) S.M.Costa
- Cephalocarpus glabra M.T.Strong
- Cephalocarpus insolitus S.M.Costa
- Cephalocarpus longifolius (Gilly) S.M.Costa
- Cephalocarpus maguireanus (T.Koyama) S.M.Costa
- Cephalocarpus montanus (Ridl.) S.M.Costa
- Cephalocarpus neblinensis S.M.Costa
- Cephalocarpus obovoideus T.Koyama
- Cephalocarpus ptariensis (Gilly) S.M.Costa
- Cephalocarpus recurviglumis (T.Koyama & Maguire) S.M.Costa
- Cephalocarpus rigidus Gilly ex Gleason & Killip
- Cephalocarpus vareschii (Maguire) S.M.Costa
