= Carnbee, Fife =

Village in Fife, Scotland

Coordinates: 56.249°N 2.759°W

Carnbee: Scottish Gaelic: Càrn Beithe
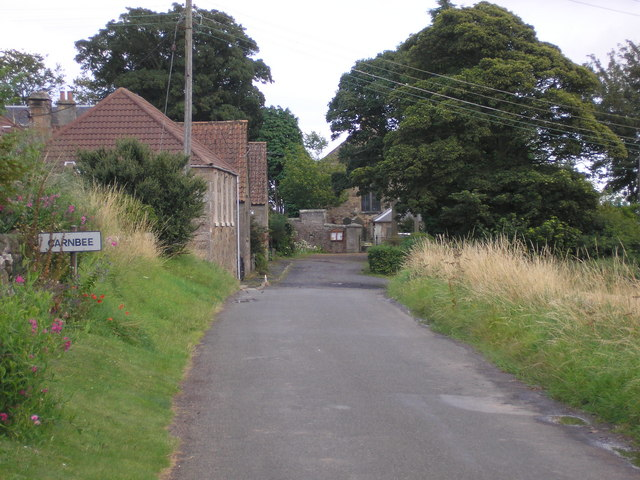
- Approaching Carnbee

- Location within Fife
- OS grid reference: NO530065
- Council area: Fife
- Country: Scotland
- Sovereign state: United Kingdom
- Police: Scotland
- Fire: Scottish
- Ambulance: Scottish
- UK Parliament: North East Fife
- Scottish Parliament: North East Fife

Carnbee is a village and rural parish in the inland part of the East Neuk of Fife, Scotland.

== Location ==
It lies to the north of Anstruther and Pittenweem. There is a very small village and the church (dating from 1793) stands amid agricultural land. The hamlet of Arncroach lies within this parish. It has a nearby cheese factory.

The name Carnbee derives from Scottish Gaelic. The second element, -bee, is obscure but probably derives from the Gaelic beith meaning 'birch' giving: "the cairn of (the) birch tree".

The parish includes Kellie Castle, formerly the seat of the Earls of Kellie and home to the Lorimer family, including Robert Lorimer, who designed the pulpit in the parish church and the Carnbee War Memorial.

== Notable residents ==
- Archibald Constable, the eminent publisher, was born and raised in Carnbee.
