= East Neuk =

Area of the coast of Fife, Scotland

Coordinates: 56°14′35″N 2°42′02″W

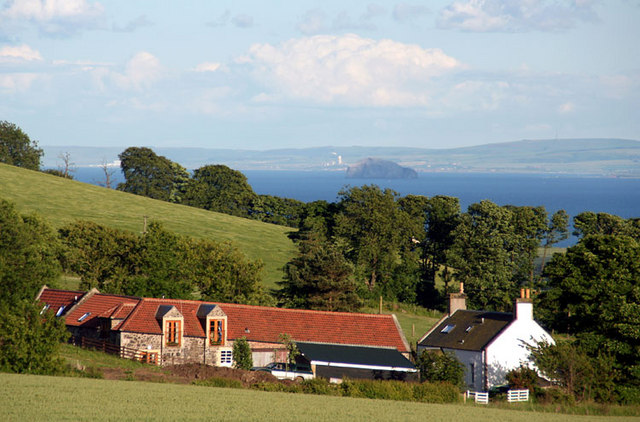
The East Neuk of Fife, looking out over the Firth of Forth to East Lothian, with the Bass Rock in the centre

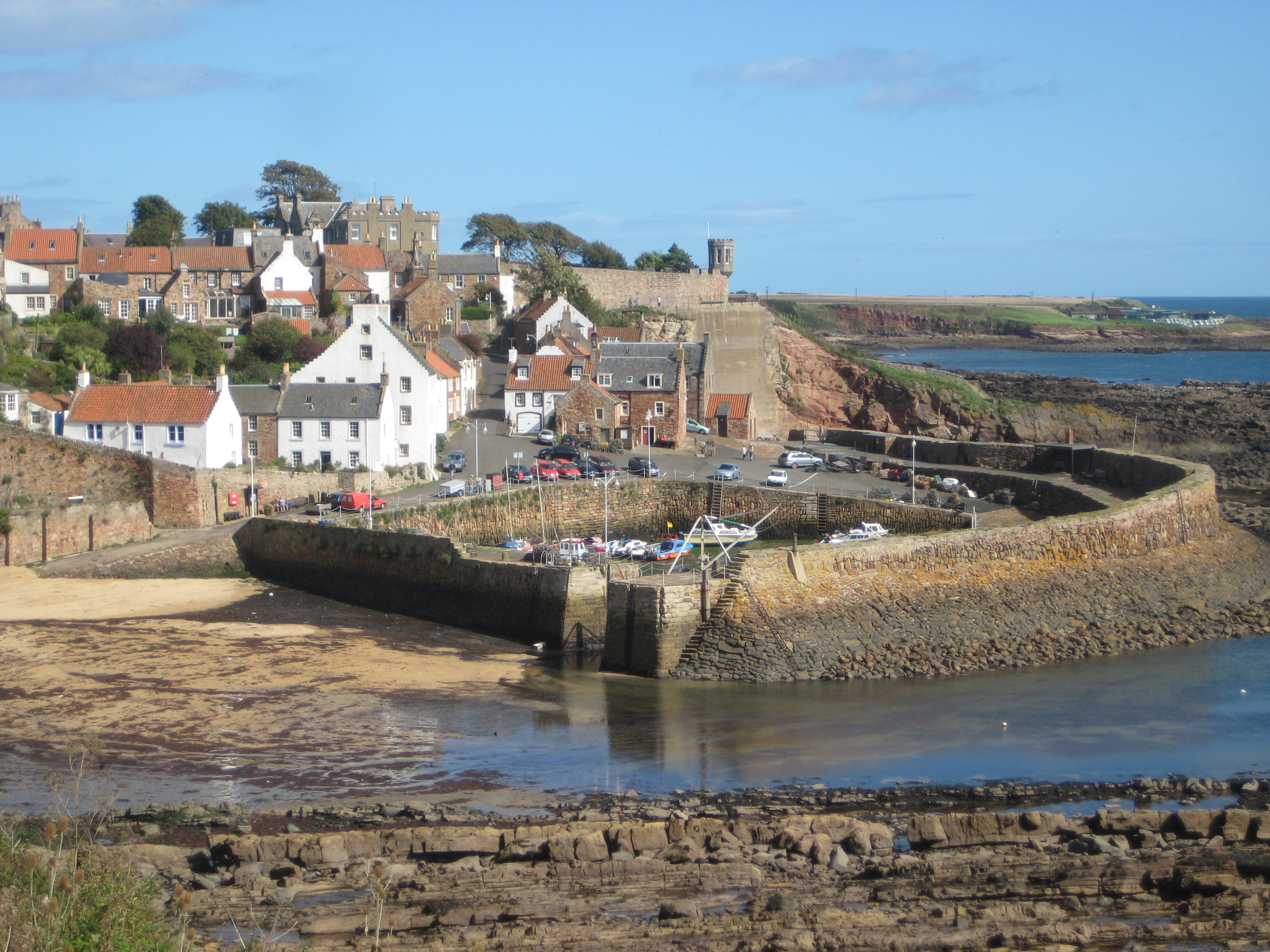
The harbour of Crail

Chalmers Lighthouse in the harbour of Anstruther

The East Neuk of Fife (/iːst njuːk/) is a coastal region of Fife, Scotland, facing the Firth of Forth and the North Sea. It is noted for its picturesque former fishing villages, which exhibit distinctive pan-tiled roofs and enclosed stone harbours. The word "neuk" is Scots for "nook" or "corner".

The East Neuk stretches from Lundin Links to St Andrews and includes the villages of Elie and Earlsferry, Colinsburgh, St Monans, Pittenweem, Arncroach, Carnbee, Anstruther, Cellardyke, Kilrenny, and Crail, as well as their immediate hinterland, as far as the upland area known as the Riggin o' Fife.

The region includes a Cold War-era bunker near Crail. Built in the late 1950s to be a regional seat of government in the event of a nuclear war, it is now a tourist attraction.

== See also ==
- Fife Coastal Path
