= John Henry Lorimer =

Scottish painter (1856–1936)

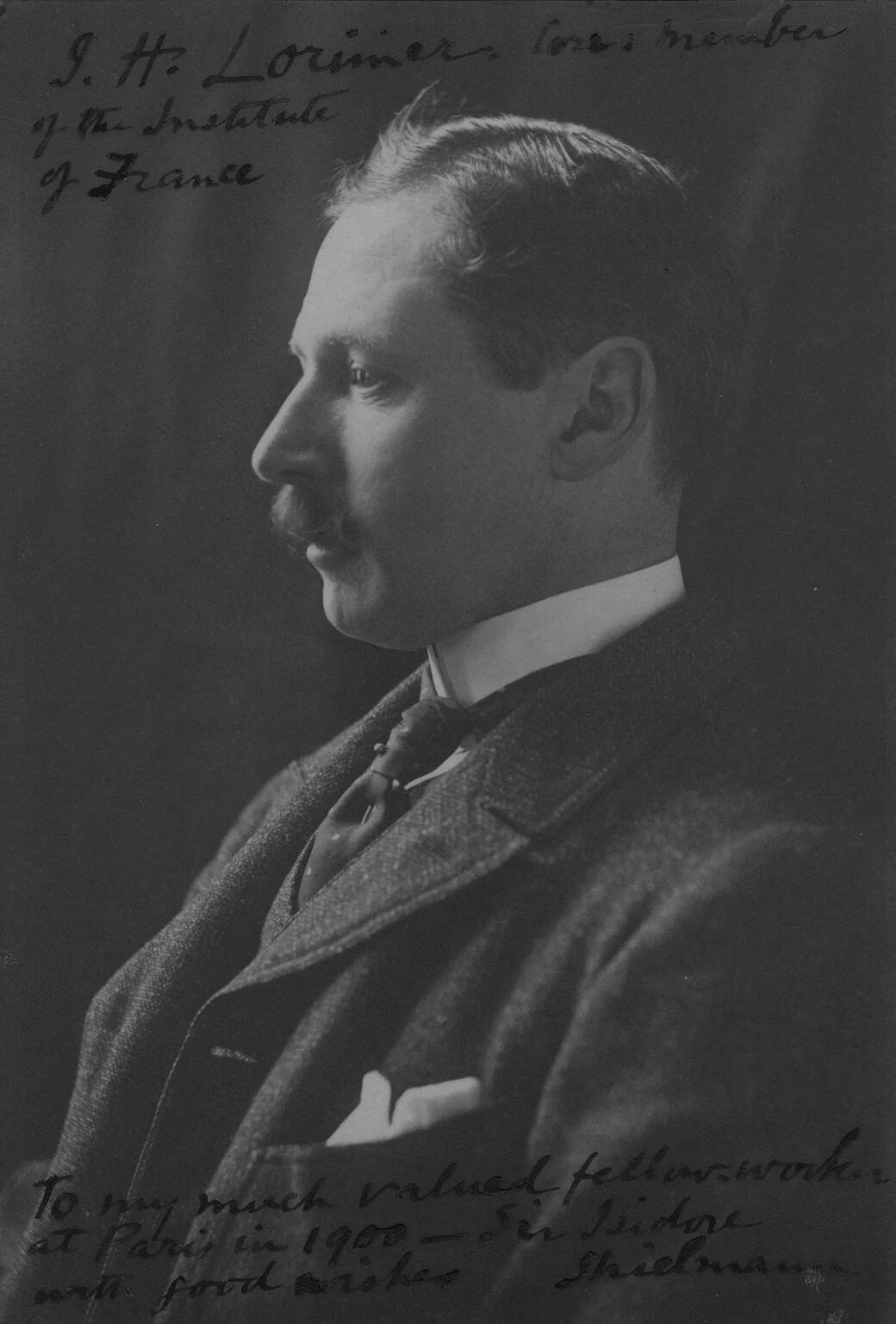
Lorimer, c. 1900

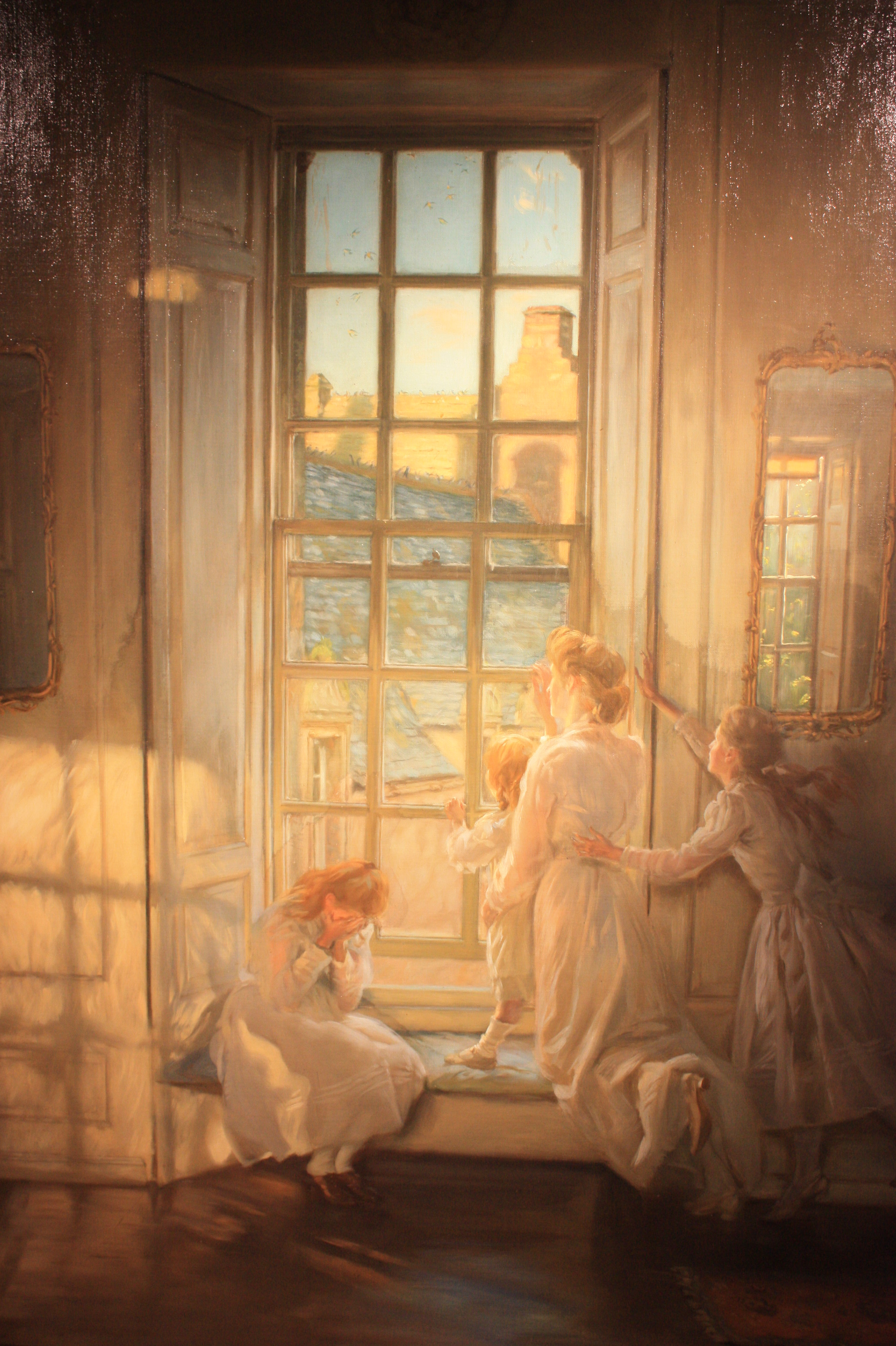
The Flight of the Swallows by John Henry Lorimer, 1906

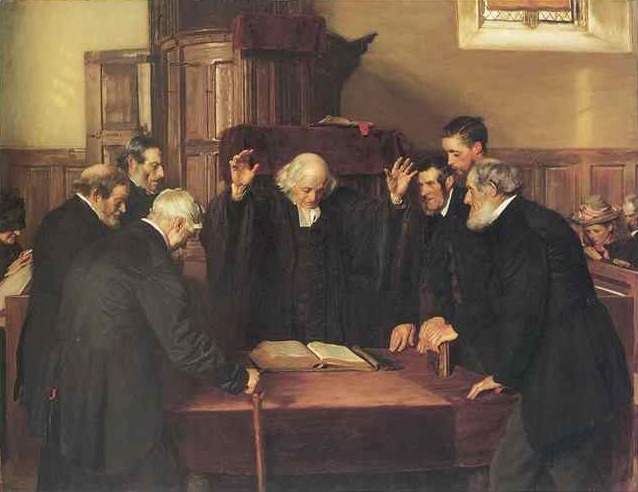
The Ordination of Elders in a Scottish Kirk, 1891. National Gallery of Scotland.

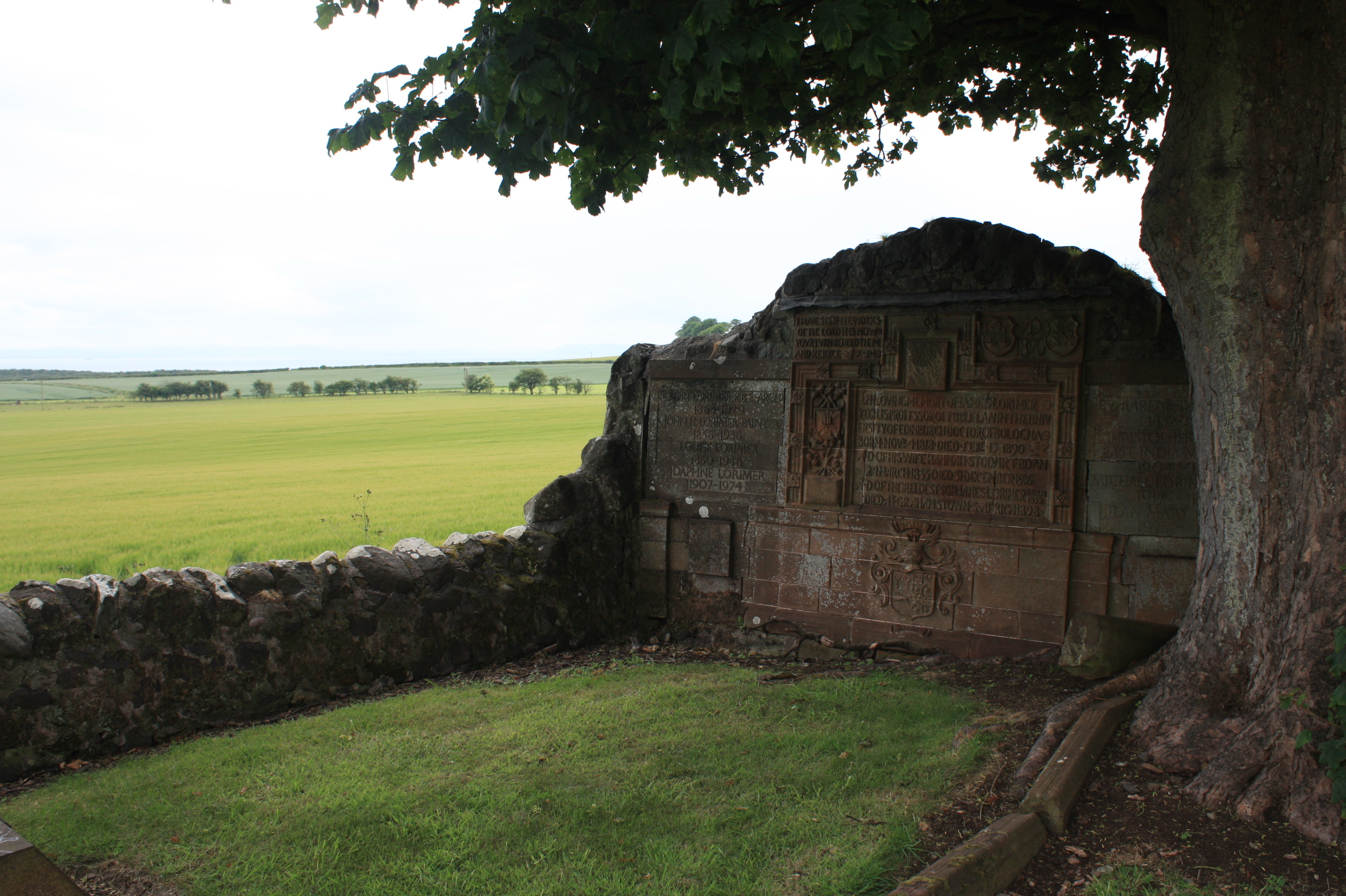
The Lorimer family grave, Newburn, Fife

John Henry Lorimer (12 August 1856 – 4 November 1936) was a Scottish painter who worked on portraits and genre scenes of everyday life.

== Life ==
Lorimer was born in Edinburgh, the son of James Lorimer, who was Regius Professor of Public Law at Edinburgh University from 1862 to 1890. He was educated at Edinburgh Academy, Edinburgh University and in 1875 at the Royal Scottish Academy, taught by William McTaggart and George Paul Chalmers. This was followed by a period spent in Paris studying with Carolus-Duran. His younger brother was the renowned architect Sir Robert Lorimer, who he sketched and painted throughout his life along with his sisters. Lorimer's first portrait was of his mother Hannah, completed in 1875 when he was 19 years old.

Lorimer travelled throughout Spain, Italy and Algiers between 1877 and 1891. He exhibited at the Royal Scottish Academy from 1873 and at the Royal Academy from 1878. Significant amongst his works are The Ordination of Elders in a Scottish Kirk, which hangs in the National Gallery of Scotland, Spring Moonlight, which hangs in Kirkcaldy Museum and Art Gallery and was the favourite painting of the readers of the local newspaper The Fife Free Press, and Kellie Castle Garden, which was sold at auction in 2000 for £32,900. His portraits include those of Lyon Playfair, Joseph Lister, Peter Hately Waddell and Frederick Guthrie Tait.

Lorimer was elected an associate of the Royal Scottish Academy in 1882 and made a full academician in 1900. He showed 123 works at the Royal Scottish Academy and 43 works at the Royal Academy in London.

In 1878, the Lorimer family acquired the lease of Kellie Castle in Fife and began its restoration for use as a holiday home. Many of Lorimer's paintings included Kellie Castle as a subject or as a setting; his studio was in one of the towers and looked out over the garden. Kellie Castle became the permanent family home, after purchase in 1948 by Robert Lorimer's son, the sculptor Hew Lorimer. The castle is owned today by the National Trust for Scotland who maintain a changing exhibition of his works, plus those of his brother, Robert Lorimer and nephew, Hew Lorimer.

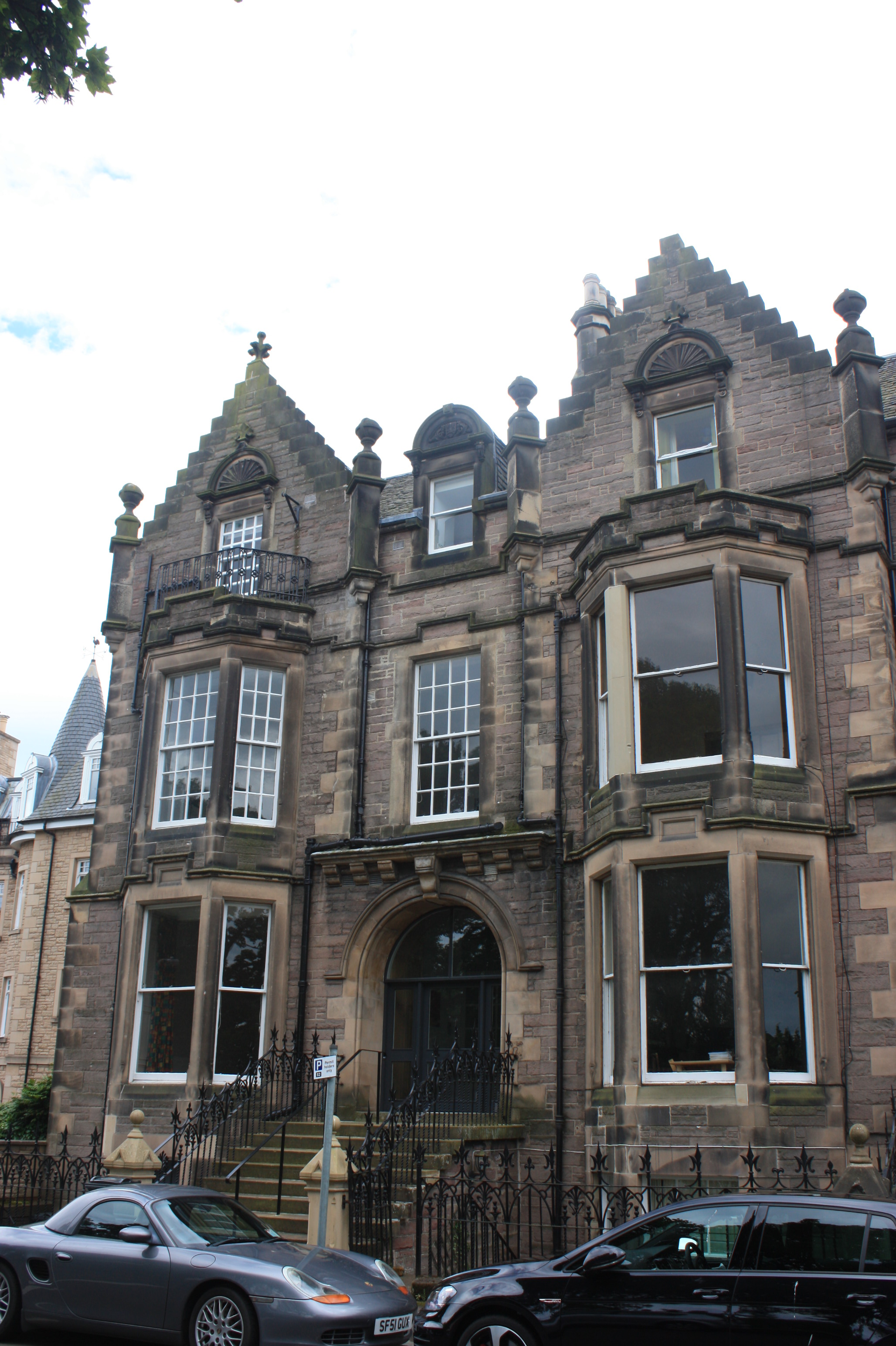
1 Bruntsfield Crescent, Edinburgh

In later life, he lived at 1 Bruntsfield Crescent in Edinburgh in a large house remodelled by his brother Robert Lorimer who also lived there together with their sister Louise Lorimer. The artist Robert Gibb lived next door at 2 Bruntsfield Crescent at that time.

He was a vice-president of the Edinburgh Astronomical Association (now known as the Astronomical Society of Edinburgh) and left a bequest to them on his death. The Lorimer Medal of the Astronomical Society of Edinburgh is now awarded in his name, the first being presented to Sir James Jeans in 1937.

John Henry Lorimer died at Gyles House, Pittenweem, Fife, on 4 November 1936.

He is buried with his parents and siblings in the family grave in the extreme south-west corner of the remote Newburn Churchyard in rural Fife.
