= Newliston =

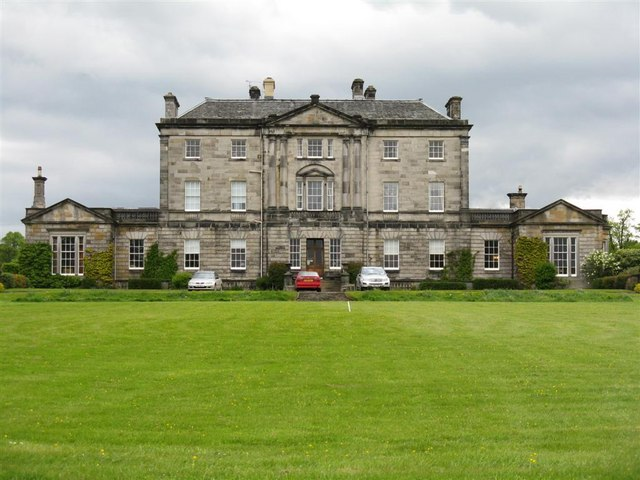
- South façade of Newliston

- Location in Edinburgh council area
- 55.9466°N 3.4251°W

Site notes
- Architect: Robert Adam

Listed Building – Category A
- Designated: 22 February 1971
- Reference no.: LB27578

Inventory of Gardens and Designed Landscapes in Scotland
- Official name: Newliston
- Designated: 30 June 1987
- Reference no.: GDL00298

Newliston is an 18,146 sq ft (1,685.8 m^{2}) country house near Edinburgh, Scotland. It is located 1 mile (1.6 km) south-west of Kirkliston, and 8 miles (13 km) west of the city centre. The house, designed by Robert Adam in the late 18th century, is a category A listed building. The 18th-century gardens, inspired by the French formal style, are included in the Inventory of Gardens and Designed Landscapes in Scotland, the listing of nationally significant gardens. Newliston is within the City of Edinburgh council area and the historic county of West Lothian.

== History ==
Newliston was originally the property of the Dundas family of nearby Dundas Castle. Duncan Dundas, the Lord Lyon King of Arms, acquired the property in the 15th century. His descendant, Elizabeth Dundas, 8th of Newliston, married John Dalrymple, 1st Earl of Stair (1648–1707).

Their son John Dalrymple, 2nd Earl of Stair (1679–1747), served as ambassador to the French court at Versailles from 1715 to 1720. Inspired by the formal style of the gardens of Versailles, Lord Stair set about planning a grand garden for Newliston. The architect William Adam drew up plans for a new mansion, as well as a layout for the gardens, in 1723–1725. William Adam's design for the house was never built, although the stables are probably his work. Much of the detail of the garden design, including canals, cascades and avenues, may have been the work of Lord Stair himself. Work on the gardens continued until 1744, employing up to 200 workmen. Lord Stair was an officer in the British Army, rising to the rank of Field Marshal at the Battle of Dettingen (1743) and opposing the Jacobites during the Rising of 1745. Lord Stair's loyalty has led to suggestions that the 'Union Jack' patterned layout of "Hercules Wood" within the grounds is a celebration of his part in the victory at Dettingen.

In 1747, following Lord Stair's death, Newliston was sold to London merchant Roger Hog. His son, Thomas Hog of Newliston, commissioned Robert Adam, son of William Adam, to design the present house in 1789. The house then became the home of James Maitland Hog, Roger's grandson.

The landscape designer William Sawrey Gilpin worked on improvements to the grounds in the 1830s, during which time the Edinburgh and Glasgow Railway was built through the south-west corner of the Newliston parks. The East Lodge, on the B800 road, was built in 1848, probably to the designs of David Bryce.

The house remains in the ownership of Roger Hog's descendants, and is open to the public during the summer. A ride-on miniature railway runs through the grounds.

In August 2026, Dan Morehead, crypto-billionaire and founder and CEO of Pantera Capital acquired the Newliston Estate for £10,300,000.
