= Guyana National Museum =

Museum in Georgetown. Guyana

- Established: 13 February 1868
- Location: Georgetown, Guyana
- Coordinates: 6.81361°N 58.1657°W

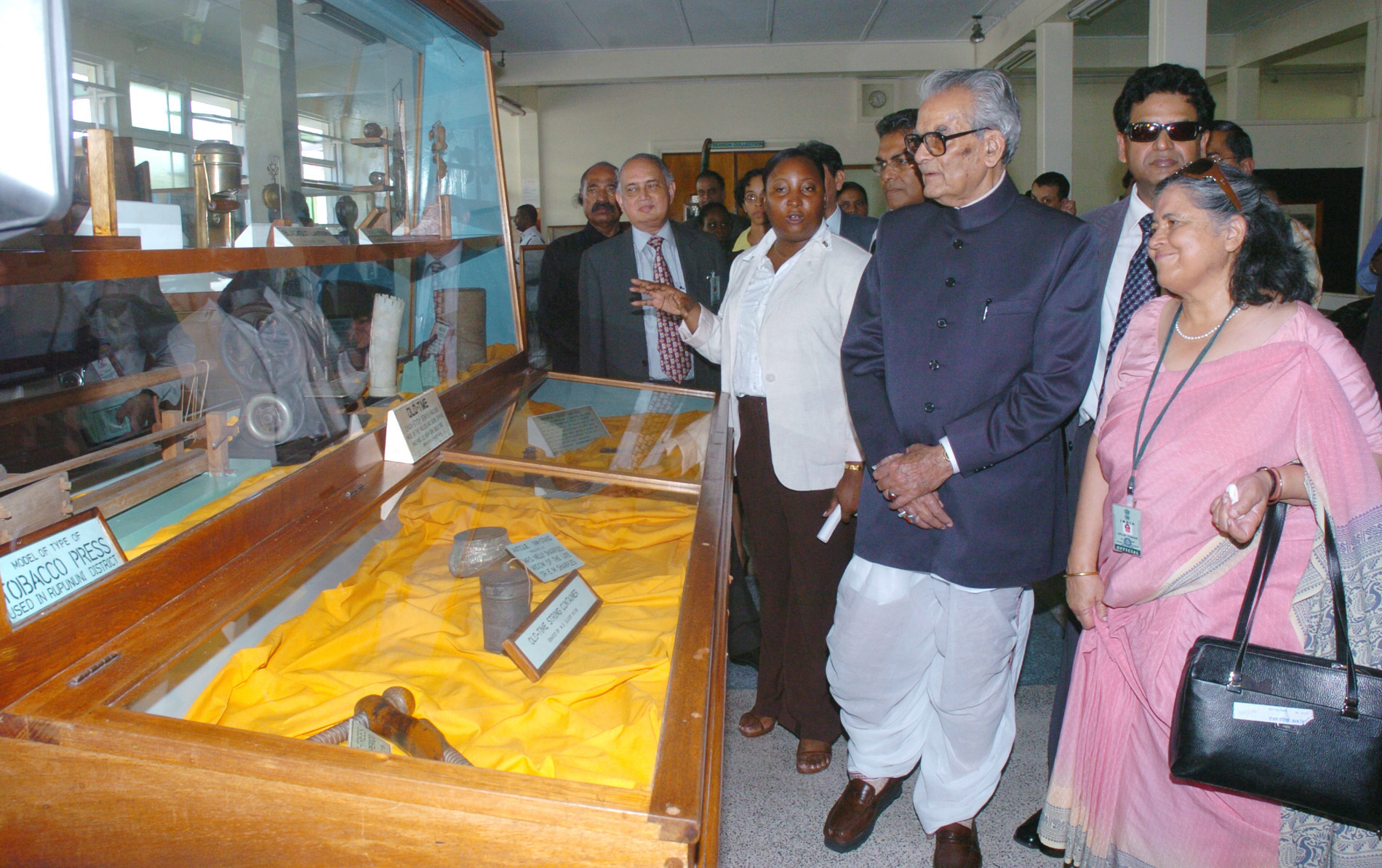
The Vice President of India, Shri Bhairon Singh Shekhawat, visits Guyana National museum at Georgetown, Guyana on November 07, 2006.

Guyana National Museum is a museum in Georgetown, Demerara-Mahaica, Guyana. It was established on 13 February 1868.

Many of the museum's artifacts have been there for more than fifty years, like the Pork-knocker, which has been on display for over sixty years. There are also miniature versions of the Transport and Harbours Department Ferry boats. On display is also the "PR1" vehicle, used by the Prime Minister Dr. Ptolemy Reid, during his tenure in high political office.
