= James Lorimer (advocate) =

British lawyer (1818–1890)

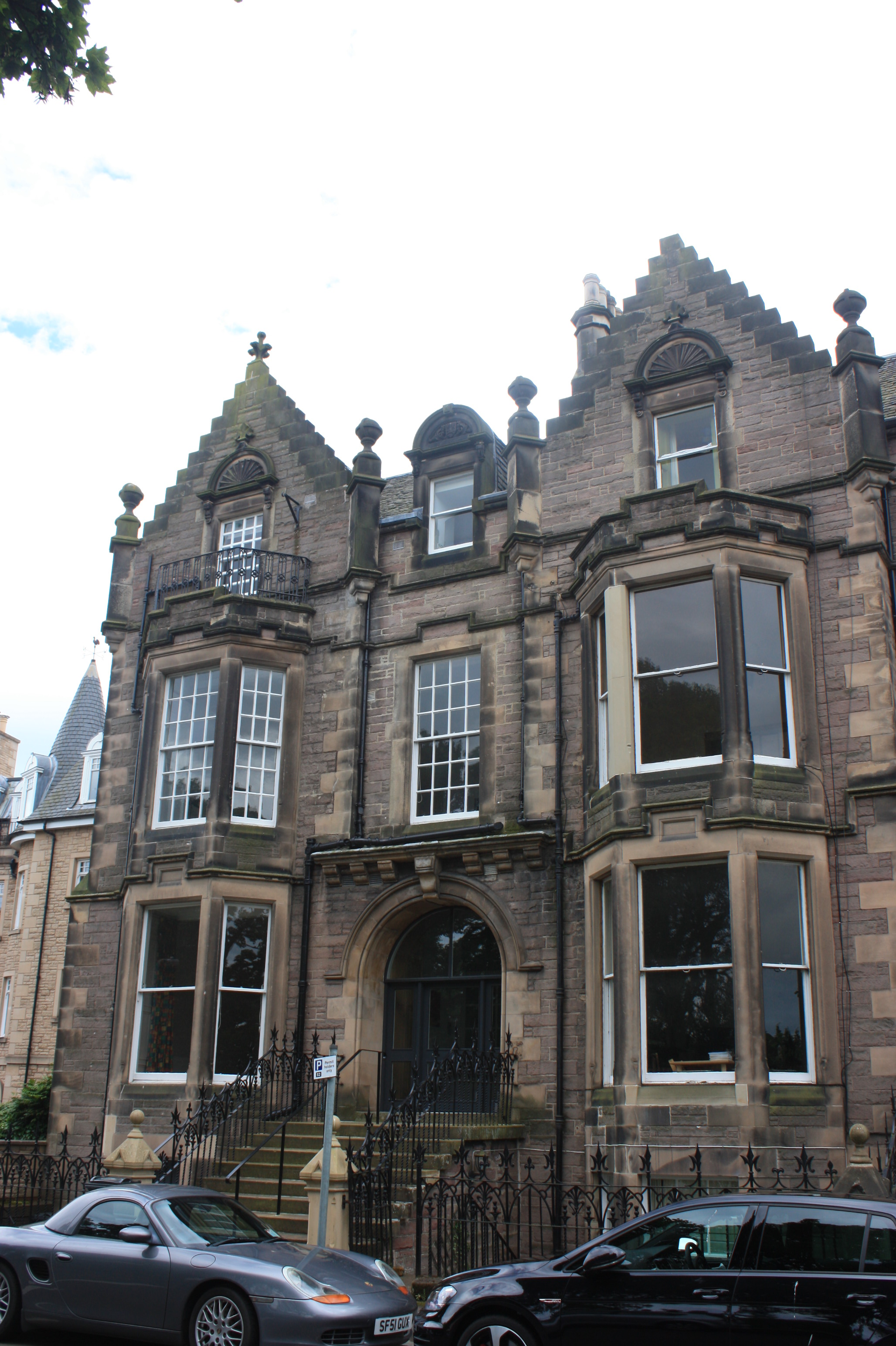
1 Bruntsfield Crescent, Edinburgh

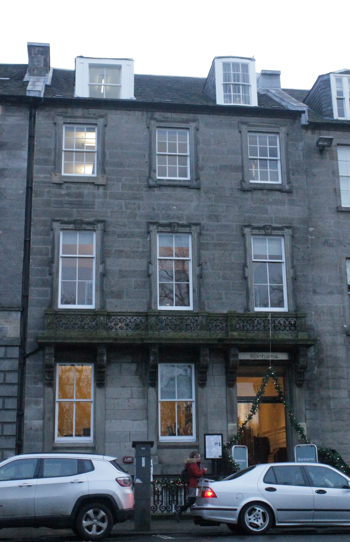
22 Queen Street, Edinburgh

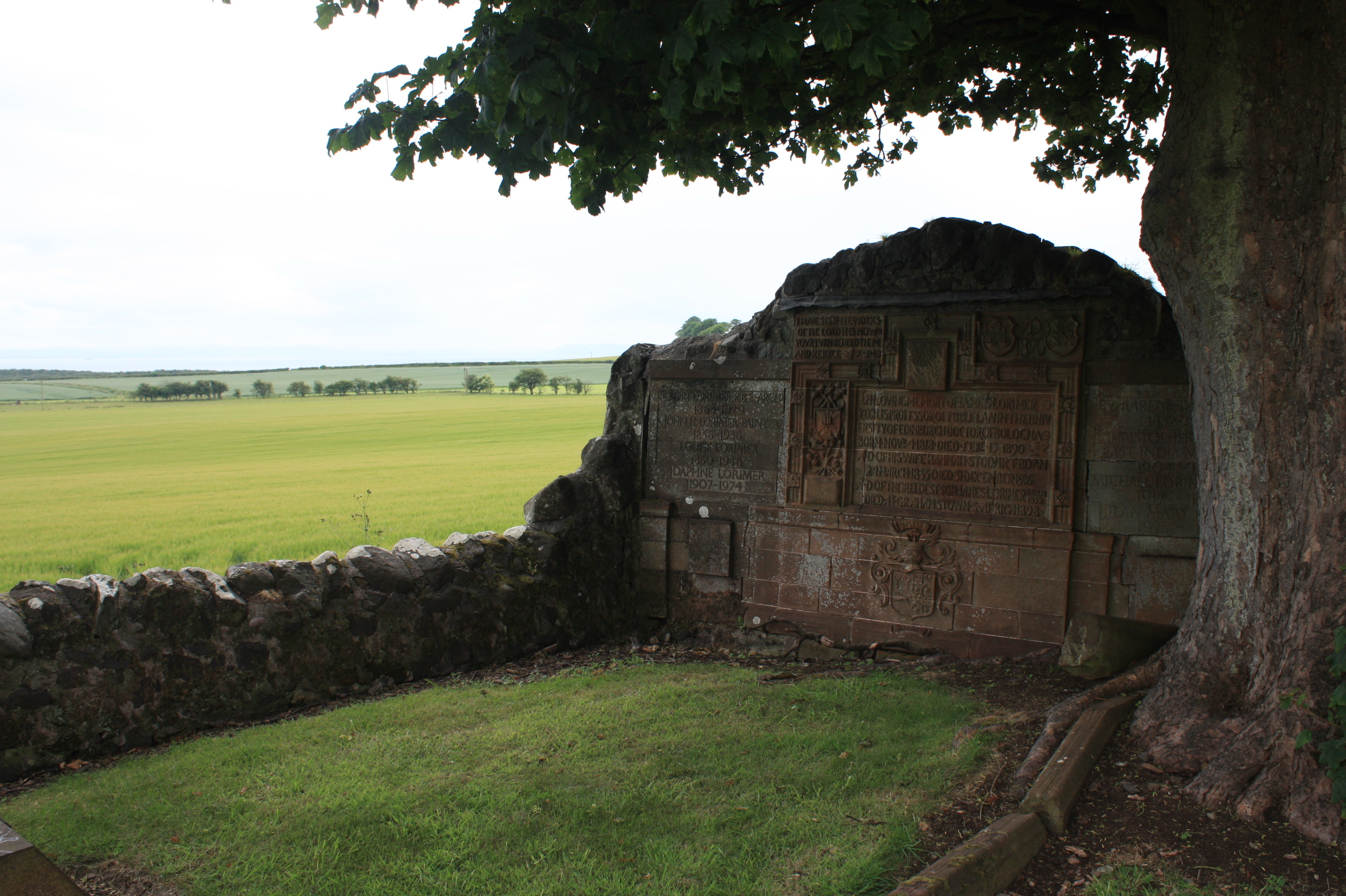
The Lorimer family grave, Newburn, Fife

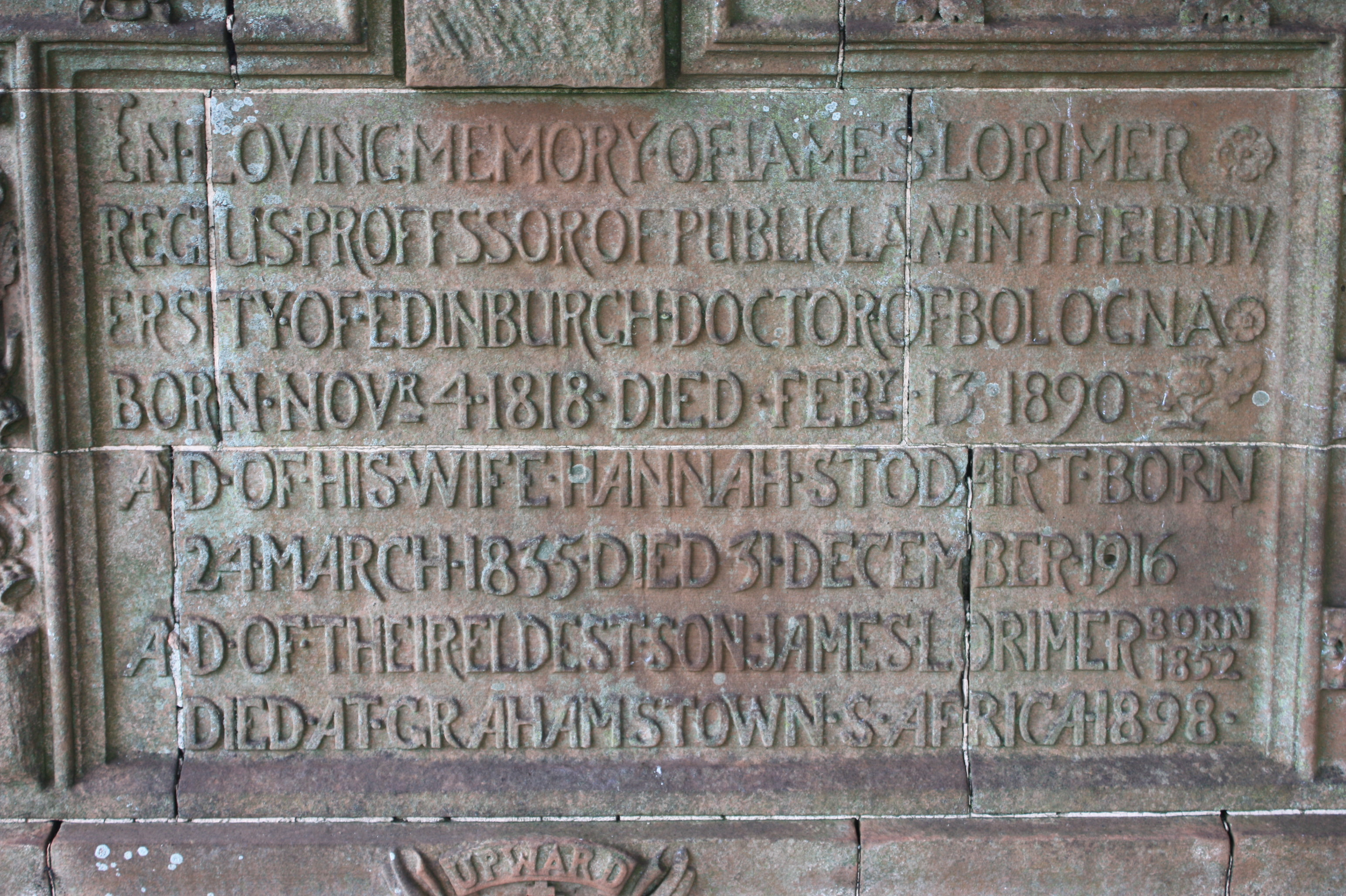
The inscription to James Lorimer

James Lorimer of Kellyfield, FRSE LLD (4 November 1818 – 13 February 1890) was a Scottish advocate and professor of public law. He was an authority on international law. He has been credited with coining the concept of international organization.

== Life ==
Lorimer was born in Aberdalgie House in Perthshire. He was the son of James Lorimer, manager of the Earl of Kinnoull's estates, and Janet Webster. He was educated at the High School in Perth then studied law at Edinburgh University, doing further postgraduate studies in Berlin, Bonn and Geneva, broadening his understanding of European Law.

He was admitted to the Faculty of Advocates in 1845. He purchased an impressive Georgian townhouse at 22 Queen Street, with James Jardine as a close neighbour. In 1861, he was elected a Fellow of the Royal Society of Edinburgh his proposer being Leonard Schmitz.

He became Regius Professor of Public Law at the University of Edinburgh in 1862, a post he retained until his death. The post had been vacant since the death of Robert Hamilton in 1831. After gaining this post, he moved to 21 Hill Street, close to Old College where he worked.

Lorimer first rented Kellie Castle in 1878 and it became the family home. His children included the painter John Henry Lorimer and the architect Sir Robert Lorimer and his grandson was the sculptor Hew Lorimer.

In Edinburgh after retiral he moved to the suburb of Bruntsfield, living at 1 Bruntsfield Crescent.

He is buried in the extreme south-west corner of the very small and remote Newburn Churchyard in Fife with his wife and children. The grave is designed by his son, Robert Lorimer who was later buried in the same grave.

A plaque in his memory is situated at the entrance to the Law Faculty at the University of Edinburgh.

== Works ==
Lorimer's publications include The Institutes of Law: a Treatise of the Principles of Jurisprudence as Determined by Nature (1872) and The Institutes of the Law of Nations: a Treatise of the Jural Relations of Separate Political Communities (two volumes, 1884).

Lorimer has been credited with coining the concept of international organization in a 1871 article in the Revue de Droit International et de Legislation Compare. Lorimer use the term frequently in his two-volume Institutes of the Law of Nations (1883, 1884).

His legal philosophy was one of Natural law that stood against the prevailing Legal positivism. His worldview defined humanity organization divided into civilized states, barbarians and savages.

His concerns with the application of natural law to international relations were particularly influential in formalising the forms of inter-state recognition in 19th century continental Europe. In 1873 he was one of the founders of the Institut de Droit International.

== Family ==
Lorimer married Hannah Stodart (1835–1916) in 1851. She was only 16, he was 33.

Lorimer was the father of both the noted architect, Sir Robert Lorimer, and the famous painter, John Henry Lorimer. These sons are buried with him, together with their sister, Louise Lorimer (1860-1946). He was also the father of the artist Hannah Cassels im Thurn.

Their eldest son James Lorimer (1852–1898) died in Grahamstown, South Africa.

== Artistic recognition ==
Lorimer's portrait, by J. H. Lawson, hangs in the main stair leading to the Playfair Library in Old College, University of Edinburgh.

His sketch portraits of 1884, by William Brassey Hole, are held by the Scottish National Portrait Gallery. He was also sketched and painted by his son John Henry on several occasions.
