= B. N. H. Orphoot =

Scottish architect (1880–1964)

Burnett Naper Henderson Orphoot (1880–1964) was a Scottish architect specialising in building restoration. He was known as "Phootie". As an artist he was also known as an etcher and watercolourist. As an architect he was a traditionalist, but some of his villas adopting an Arts and Crafts style. His career was disrupted by the two World Wars.

== Life ==
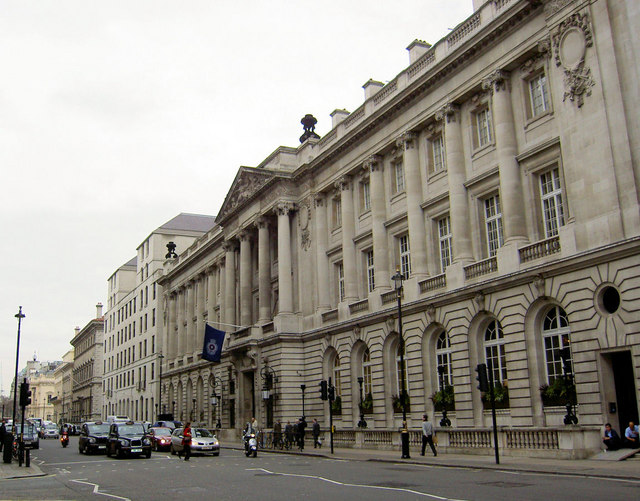
RAC Club, Pall Mall, London

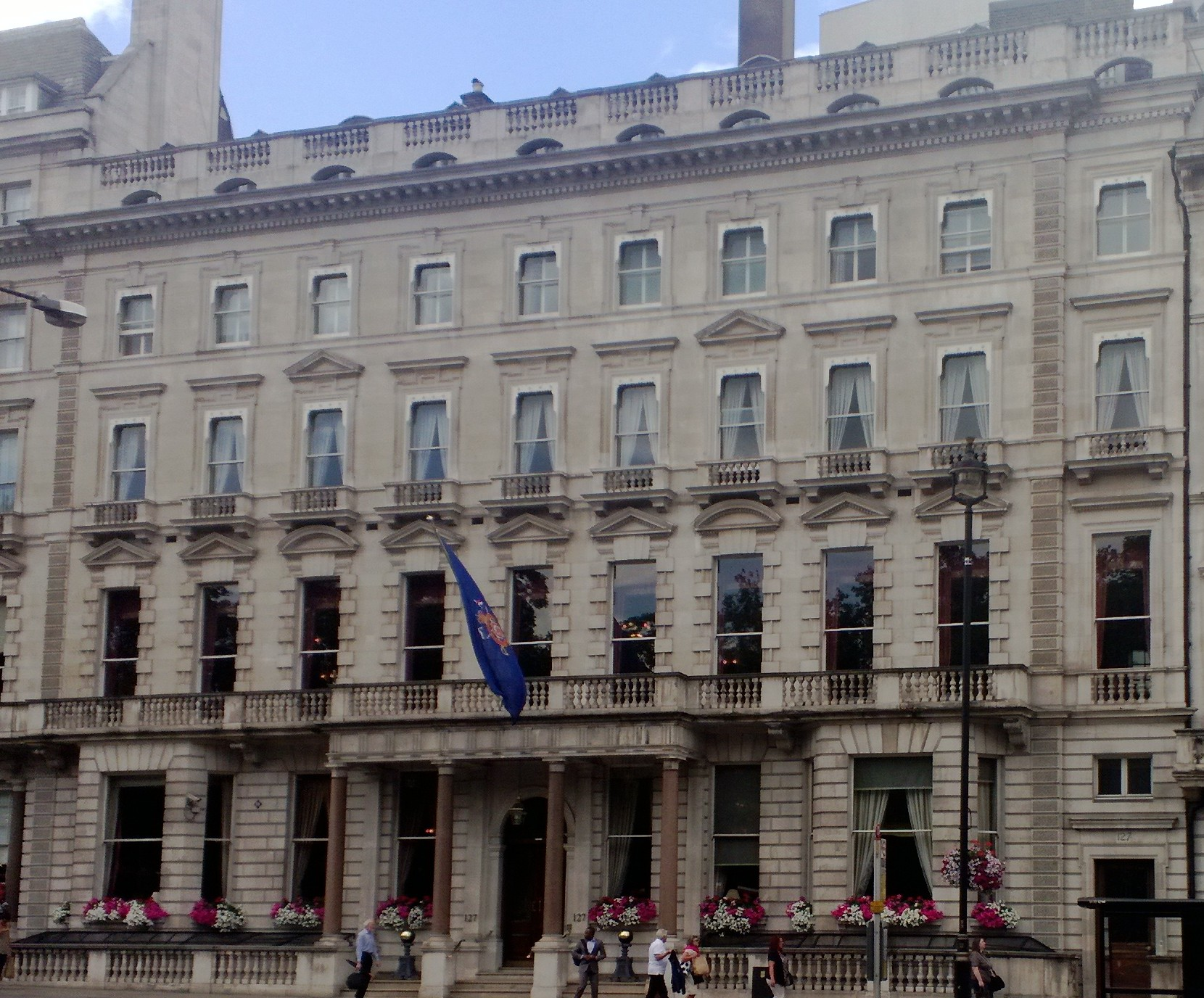
Cavalry Club, Piccadilly

He was born on 13 April 1880 at "The Priory" in Peebles the son of Thomas Henderson Orphoot (1833-1917), Sheriff Substitute of Lothian and Peebles, and his wife, Edith Carmichael Smyth Burnett, daughter of James Burnett of Barns. He was privately educated at Rugby School then studied architecture at Edinburgh University.

He was articled in the office of John More Dick Peddie and George Washington Browne from 1900 to 1903. In 1903 he moved to the offices of Robert Rowand Anderson for a year before going to Paris for two years to work with Gustave Umbdenstock also studying at the Ecole des Beaux Arts. In 1906 he joined the office of Mewes & Davis in London where he was entrusted with some major projects. He did not return to Edinburgh until 1910 when he set up independently at 25 Queensferry Street just off the west end of Princes Street. He was also able to maintain a London office.

In the First World War he joined the Royal Engineers. He returned to the Queensferry Street office in 1919 but closed his London office. In 1921 he went into partnership with F E Whiting.

In 1923 Ian Gordon Lindsay joined the partnership. This was disrupted when both Whiting and Lindsay joined up in the Second World War. Orphoot continued alone, but most projects dried up anyway. After the war Lindsay returned to the partnership. Orphoot continued in name only and did very little design work after 1945.

He officially retired in 1952 and died in Edinburgh on 8 April 1964.

== Restoration projects ==
- Finavon Castle
- Haystoun House near Peebles (1925)
- Arisaig House (after a fire)
- St Ninians RC Church in Tynet (1949)

== New build projects ==
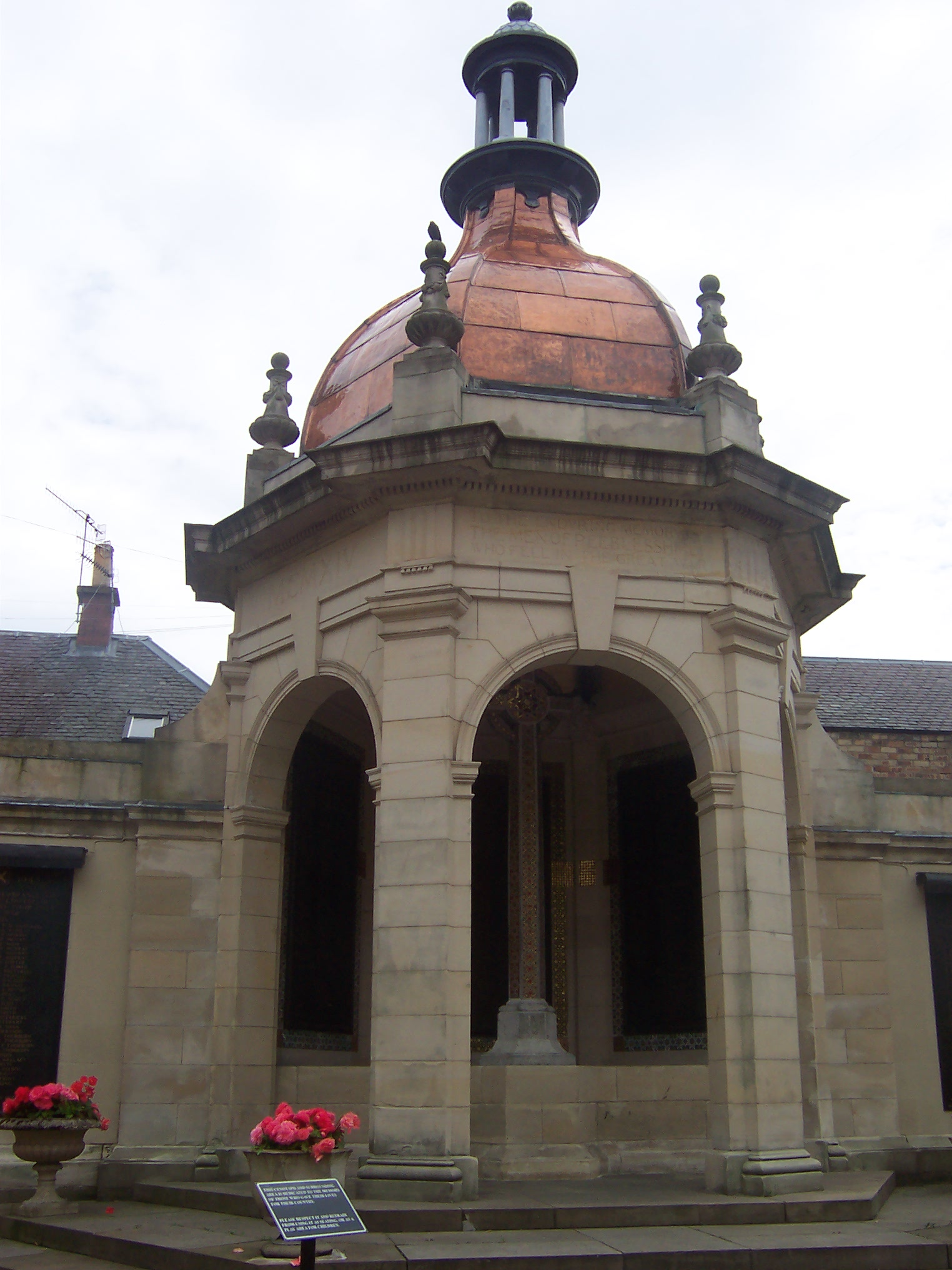
First World War monument, Peebles by Fairlie and Orphoot

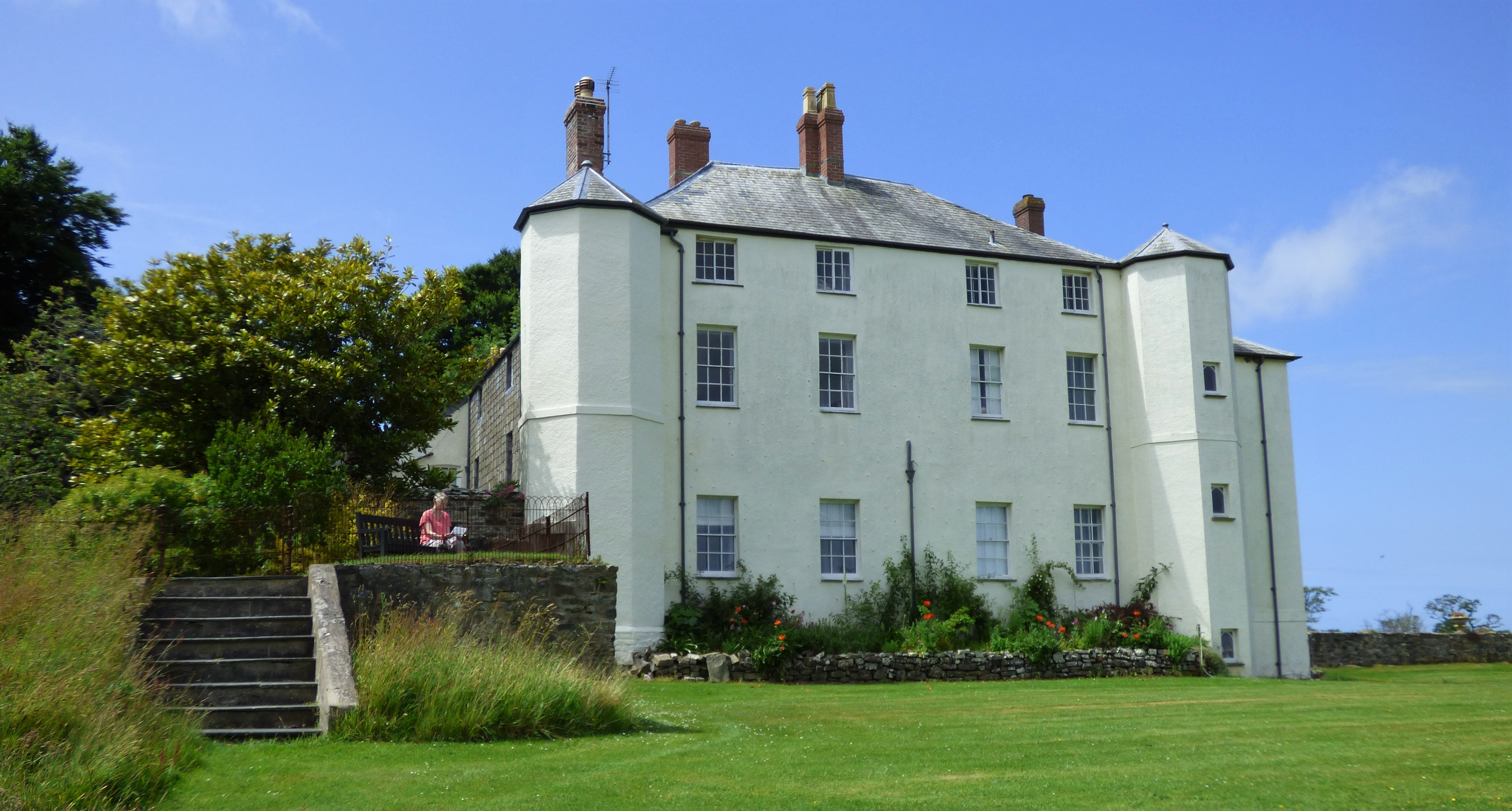
Clovelly Court

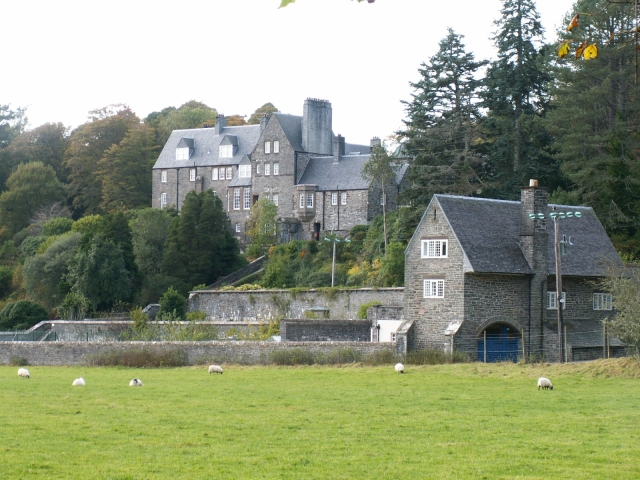
Arisaig House

- RAC Club, Pall Mall, London under Mewes & Davis (1908)
- Cavalry Club, Piccadilly, London under Mewes & Davis (1909)
- New frontage facing Thames at the Savoy Hotel in London (1910)
- Princess Theatre, Edinburgh (1911)
- Housing for Carnegie Trust in Dunfermline (1915)
- Peebles War Memorial (1922) with Reginald Fairlie
- Birnie House in Perthshire
- Clovelly Court in Devon
- Garrows House in Perthshire
- Lethendry in Edinburgh
- Garden City Housing Scheme in Bonnyrigg (1923)
- Dutch House, Budleigh Salterton (1924)
- Cuill in Edinburgh (1928)
- Greybeild in Peebles (1928)
- Well House, 3 Easter Belmont Road in Edinburgh (1928) for himself
- Bruce Hill in Edinburgh (1932)
- Regal Cinema, Barnstaple (1937)
- Harrow Inn, Peebles (1939)

== Artworks ==
- Cochem Castle
- Paris Street Scene (1907)

== Family ==
In 1915, Orphoot married Marjorie Harriet White (1878-1933), the daughter of Rev John Benny White of Devon.

He lived his later life with his sister at Well House. Well House is a listed building.
