= Ian Gordon Lindsay =

Scottish architect (1906–1966)

- Born: 29 July 1906; Edinburgh, Scotland
- Died: 28 August 1966 (aged 60)
- Occupation: Architect

Ian Gordon Lindsay (29 July 1906 – 28 August 1966) was a Scottish architect. He was most noted for his numerous restoration projects, sometimes of whole villages but was also involved in the design of several hydro-electric power stations.

== Early life ==
Lindsay was born in Edinburgh in 1906, son of George Herbert Lindsay, distiller and baillie (town councillor), and Helen Eliza Turnbull. He was educated at Marlborough College and Trinity College, Cambridge. Here he began a lifetime friendship with John Betjeman.

Like many artistically-minded Cambridge undergraduates of his generation, Lindsay came under the spell of "Manny": Mansfield Duval Forbes. In his circle, Lindsay made a number of friends who were to have considerable influence on his later work; amongst these were Raymond McGrath, Oliver Hill, Robert Hurd, Thomas Steuart Fothringham and Robert Simpson.

== Architect ==
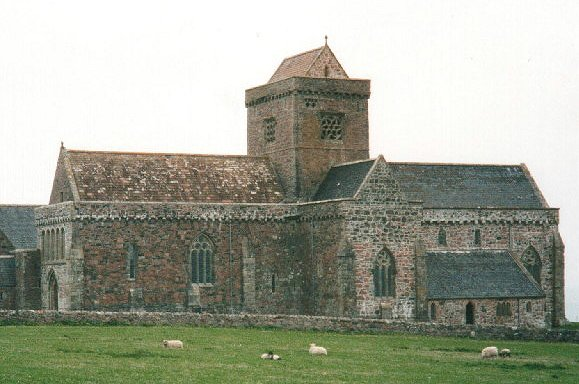
Iona Abbey following restoration

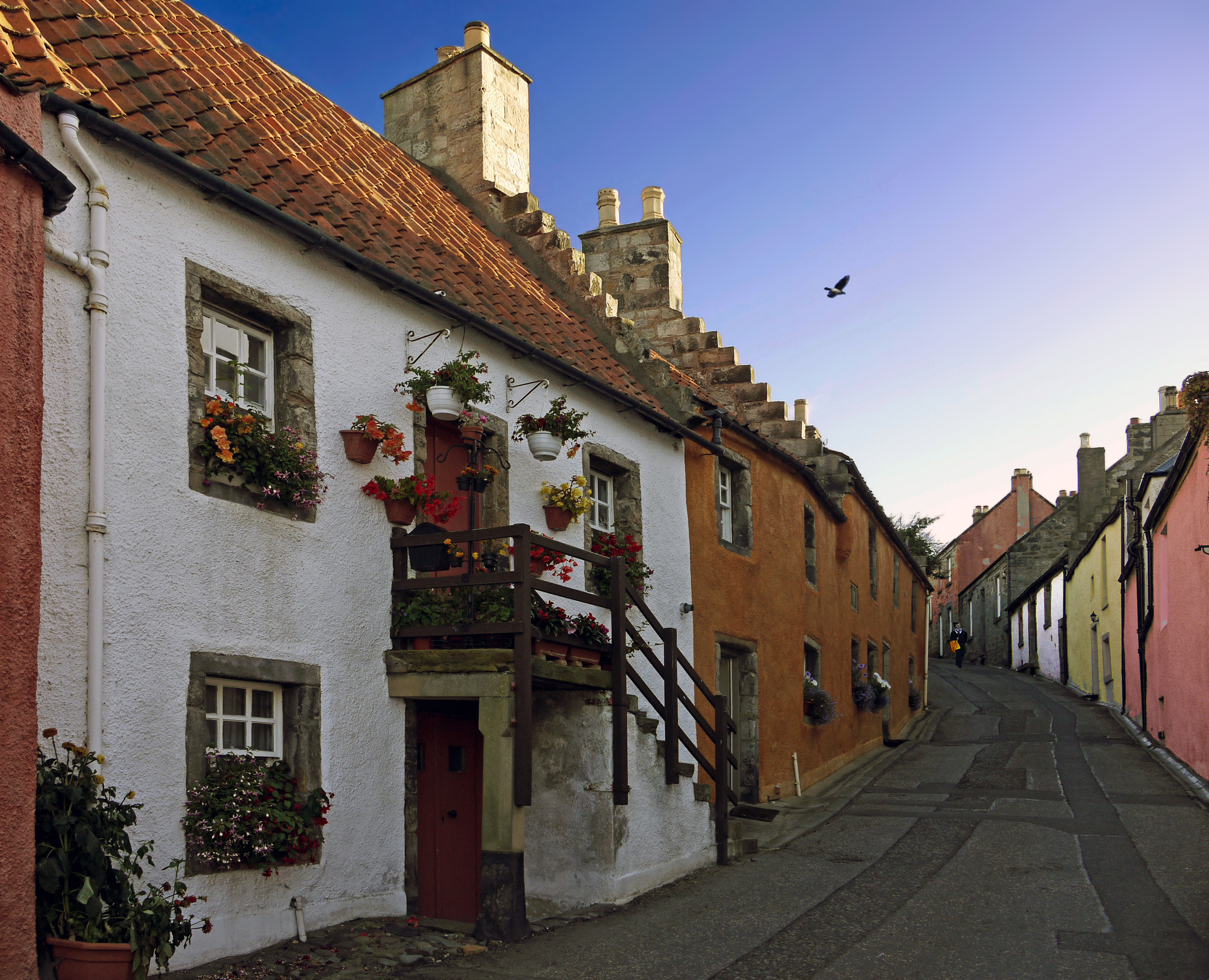
Street in Culross

After leaving Cambridge he was apprenticed to Reginald Fairlie in 1927. In 1931 he commenced practice on his own account before joining the firm of Orphoot and Whiting in 1933. In 1932 Lindsay married the Hon Maysie Elizabeth Loch, daughter of Major General the 2nd Baron Loch of Drylaw and Stoke College.

During the 1930s Lindsay quickly developed a wide circle of personal and professional friends, many of whom were later to provide work for his architectural practice. Amongst these were the 4th Marquess of Bute, and his nephew Major Michael Crichton Stuart, Dr Francis Carolus Eeles (secretary of the Council for the Care of Churches), J S Richardson (principal inspector of Ancient Monuments) and Peter F. Anson the writer and historian.

The Dictionary of Scottish Architects states that Lindsay's circle of influential contacts was further widened when his sister, Ailsa Margaret Lindsay, married Lt Col Charles Findlay DSO, younger son of architect Lt Col James Leslie Findlay and grandson of John Ritchie Findlay of The Scotsman. The connection to the Marquess of Bute (and his links to the National Trust for Scotland) led Lindsay to be commissioned in 1936 to draw up lists of important buildings in 103 Scottish towns and villages, based on an Amsterdam model of three categories (A, B and C). Lindsay continued this work for many years, although interrupted by the outbreak of war, and this produced the basic list upon which statutory protection for listed buildings was later introduced in 1947, following expansion to cover all areas.

As Orphoot, Whiting and Lindsay the firm began major projects of restoration and renovation in the late 1930s at Iona Abbey, and the Canongate Kirk in Edinburgh.

In 1934 Lindsay joined the ruling council of the Cockburn Association, the influential Edinburgh conservation organisation, a position he retained for the next 31 years. In 1939, under the auspices of the Cockburn Association, he published Old Edinburgh, 1947 (Edinburgh, Oliver & Boyd, 1947), containing a comprehensive survey and map of the remaining intact historic buildings in Edinburgh.

During the war Lindsay served in the Royal Engineers. By 1945, in the rank of Major, he was serving with the British Army of the Rhine repairing war damaged buildings and constructing refugee accommodation.

After the war Lindsay returned to architecture, gaining Fellowship of the RIBA in 1949.

In early 1952 the practice became Ian G Lindsay and Partners, and began the reconstruction of many small houses in the historic burgh of Culross in Fife, on behalf of the National Trust for Scotland. Similar projects for the Trust followed, across Scotland.

In the late 1950s and early 1960s Ian Lindsay undertook a major project involving the renovation of more than one hundred buildings in Inveraray, in Argyll, which had been previously gifted to the nation by the Duke of Argyll. Another major restoration, that of Pluscarden Abbey in Moray began at this time and was completed after Lindsay's death by William Murray Jack (1921–1999).

Ian Lindsay died of Hodgkin's Disease in Bangour Hospital in 1966. At his express wish his ashes were scattered from a boat into the waters of Iona Sound. The practice continued his work into the 1970s.

== Legacy ==
Many of Ian Lindsay's drawings and other papers are preserved by the Royal Commission on the Ancient and Historical Monuments of Scotland in the Ian G Lindsay Collection.

In 1980 Dr Ronald Cant (Note: Ronald Gordon Cant MA, D.Litt., (1908–1999) Scottish historian and conservator) established and endowed the Lindsay-Fischer lectureship, administered by The Society of Antiquaries of Scotland, in honour of Ian Lindsay and Gerhard Fischer (1890-1977). The lectureship commemorates the men's work on the historic architecture of Scotland and Norway respectively and their achievements in promoting relations between Scottish and Norwegian scholars. The Lindsay-Fischer Lecture is given in Scotland by a Scandinavian scholar and the Fischer-Lindsay Lecture is given in Oslo by a Scottish scholar, in alternate years.

== Principal works ==
- Interior of Ceres Parish Church
- Private apartments at Inveraray Castle (1930)
- Restoration of Culross village for the National Trust for Scotland (1932-6)
- Memorial Chapel in St John's Episcopal Church, Edinburgh (1933)
- Restoration of St Monans Parish Church (1935)
- St Finnan's RC Church, Invergarry (1936)
- Various rebuilding projects for the National Trust for Scotland in the village of Falkland (1936-8)
- "Period Rooms" for the Glasgow Empire Exhibition (1938)
- Restoration of Iona Abbey (1938) (commission passed by Reginald Fairlie).
- Restoration of Canongate Kirk and manse (1939)
- Restoration of Achnacarry House, Inverness-shire (1947)
- Restoration of pulpit in North Leith Parish Church, Madeira Street, Leith (1948)
- War memorial in St Cuthbert's Church, Edinburgh (1950)
- Restoration of Aldie Castle (1950-5)
- Restoration of Airlie Castle (1956)
- Lussa Hydro-Electric Scheme (for Hydro-Electric Board) (1956)
- Restoration of Culross Town Hall (1957)
- Restoration of St Oran's Chapel, Iona (1957)
- Restoration of Druminnor Castle (1958)
- Major restoration of the town of Inverary (1958)
- Restoration of riverside buildings of Cramond Village (1959)
- Restoration of Tullibole Castle home of the Scott-Moncrieffs (1959)
- Major rebuilding and restoration of Newhaven Village (1960-6)
- Restoration of Cawdor Castle (of Macbeth fame) (1960)
- Restorations and new-build on Dean Path, Dean Village, Edinburgh (1960)
- Restoration of Inveraray Castle (1960)
- Restoration of the "Little Houses" in Culross (1960)
- Various additions and restorations at Pluscarden Abbey (1960)
- Loch Gair Power Station (1961)
- Restoration of Old Breachacha Castle on the island of Coll (1961)
- Expansion of Huntly House Museum into old tenements to west (1962)
- New terraced housing at Union Street, Lochgilphead (1963)
- Prestigious restoration of New Lanark village (1964)
- Restoration and extensions to St. Cecilia's Hall for Edinburgh University (1966)
- Restoration of Barscobe Castle for Sir Hugh Wontner (1970)

== Lindsay's publications ==
- The Cathedrals of Scotland Edinburgh, W & R Chambers, 1926
- Old Edinburgh, 1939 Edinburgh, Oliver & Boyd, 1939
- Old Elgin (with Ronald G Cant) Edinburgh, Oliver & Boyd, 1945
- Old Edinburgh, 1947 Edinburgh, Oliver & Boyd, 1947
- Old Glasgow (with Ronald G Cant) Edinburgh, Oliver & Boyd, 1947
- Old Stirling (with Ronald G Cant) Edinburgh, Oliver & Boyd, 1947
- The Architecture of Scotland London, The Arts Council of Great Britain, 1948
- Georgian Edinburgh Edinburgh, Oliver & Boyd, 1948
- The Church (Canongate booklets; no.1) Edinburgh, Rev.R.S.Wright, 1950
- Culross, The Royal Burgh of Edinburgh, The National Trust for Scotland, 1959 (pamphlet)
- The Scottish Parish Kirk Edinburgh, The Saint Andrew Press, 1960
- Inveraray & the Dukes of Argyll (with Mary Cosh) Edinburgh, The Edinburgh University Press, 1973
