= Canmore =

Canmore may refer to:

- Canmore (database), a Scottish national online database of ancient monuments;
- Canmore, Alberta, a town in Canada;
- the House of Dunkeld, a royal house that ruled Scotland in the 11th, 12th and 13th centuries, including
  - Malcolm III of Scotland, nicknamed Malcolm Canmore, King of Scots 1058–1093; and
  - Malcolm IV of Scotland, also known as Malcolm Canmore, King of Scots 1153–1165;
- the University of St Andrews Catholic Chaplaincy, nicknamed Canmore, a chaplaincy in St. Andrews, Scotland.
