= Reid and Forbes =

Firm of Scottish architects

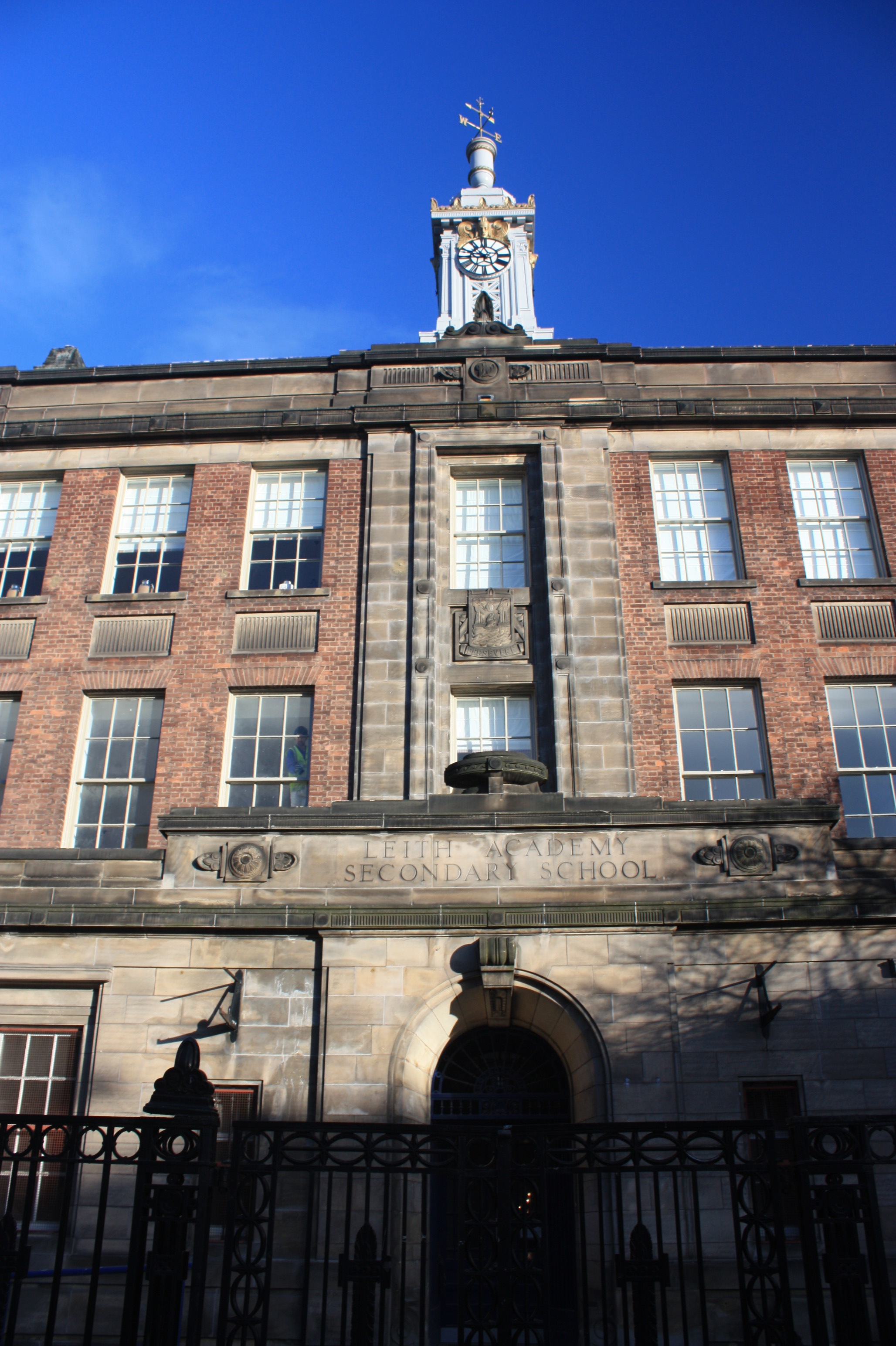
Leith Academy by Reid and Forbes

Reid and Forbes was a firm of Scottish architects specialising in school buildings in central and southern Scotland from 1920 to 1964. They had a very distinctive style and many of their buildings are now listed buildings.

== History ==
The firm was a partnership between George Reid (1893-1984) and James Shiells Forbes (1894-1976). The duo had an early collaboration with Reginald Fairlie, but generally became Reid & Forbes in 1925.

Reid was articled to the architect’s firm Scott Morton & Co in 1910 to 1914 and attended Edinburgh College of Art during the same period. During this period he was also at various points seconded to Robert Lorimer, George Washington Browne and James Bow Dunn.

After World War I Reid joined with James S Forbes and Reginald Fairlie in a private competition for local authority housing in Edinburgh and were awarded Northfield, also known as Willowbrae. Little is known of Forbes's early career, except even after the dissolution of their architectural partnership Forbes lodged in Fairlie’s house. Reid probably met Forbes through Fairlie rather than the other way around.

They had strong Roman Catholic connections and over and above their many school commissions they also were involved in several church projects.

Their heydays were clearly in the 1930s and following World War II they had far less commissions. Their early schemes were Neo Georgian in style but over time they introduced a series of eclectic modernist Art Deco designs.

Forbes died in 1976 and Reid in 1984.

== Principal works ==
see

- Housing in Moffat (with Reginald Fairlie (1921)
- Coldstream Secondary School (1922)
- Housing in Tranent (1922-3)
- Housing in Northfield, Edinburgh (1922-3) (with Reginald Fairlie)
- Innerleithen Primary and Secondary Schools (1922-3)
- Richmond Congregational Church in Niddrie, Edinburgh (1923)
- St John’s RC Primary School, Portobello, Edinburgh (1924)
- Jedburgh Grammar School north-west wing (1926)
- Gatehouse to Edinburgh Castle (incorporating Bruce and Wallace Memorial) (1928)
- Leith Academy (with rich Egyptian detailing) (1928)
- Morebattle Primary School (1931)
- Inverness High School (1932)
- Prep School and Science Block for George Heriot’s School (1933)
- Kelso Academy (1933)
- Niddrie Church and Halls (1934)
- Trinity Primary School in Hawick (1934)
- Niddrie Marischal Junior Secondary School (1935)
- Hobkirk Primary School (1936)
- Chirnside Central School (1937)
- Wilkie’s Department Store, Shandwick Place, Edinburgh (1937)
- Moredun Church and Halls, Edinburgh (1951)
- Royal High School, Edinburgh (1964)
