= Cavalry and Guards Club =

Private members club in Piccadilly, London

Coordinates: 51.5043°N 0.1482°W

- Formation: 1810 (Guards Club); 1890 (Cavalry Club); 1976 (merged club) (Clubhouse occupied since 1908)
- Type: Private members' club
- Purpose: A private members club for Cavalry and Guards officers
- Location: 127 Piccadilly, London
- Members: Military Officers in Guard's and Cavalry regiments of the British Army
- Website: cavgds.co.uk

The Cavalry and Guards Club is a Private members' club, located in London at 127 Piccadilly, Its membership consists of current and former officers of Guards and Cavalry regiments of the British Army.

It is situated next door to the Royal Air Force Club.

== History ==
The club has three foundation dates:

- 1810, the foundation date of the Guards Club, which was based in Pall Mall.
- 1890, the foundation date of the Cavalry Club, which has always been based at its current location.
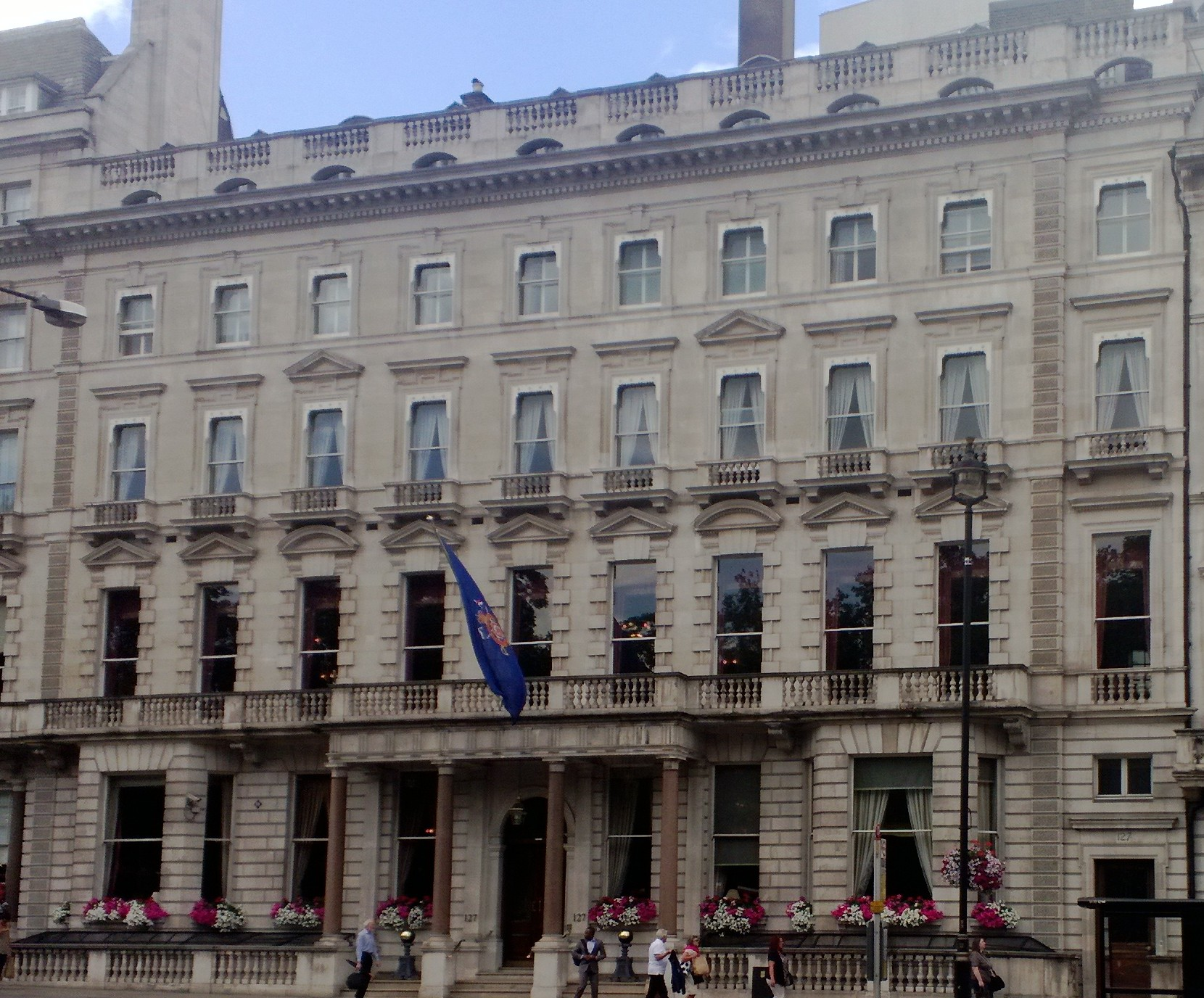
- The clubhouse main entrance
  1975, the date when the two clubs merged.

When the Cavalry Club first occupied the site in 1890, it was a proprietary club owned by an officer in the 20th Hussars, but five years later, ownership passed into the hands of its members and it became a members' club. They raised the funds to build an entirely new clubhouse, which was completed on the site in 1908. The work was carried out by the architect's firm Mewes and Davies.

Edward VIII was known to spend a great deal of time in the Cavalry Club premises in the 1920s and 1930s, when he was Prince of Wales. King Abdullah of Jordan, the Sultan of Brunei and Prince William have also been members.

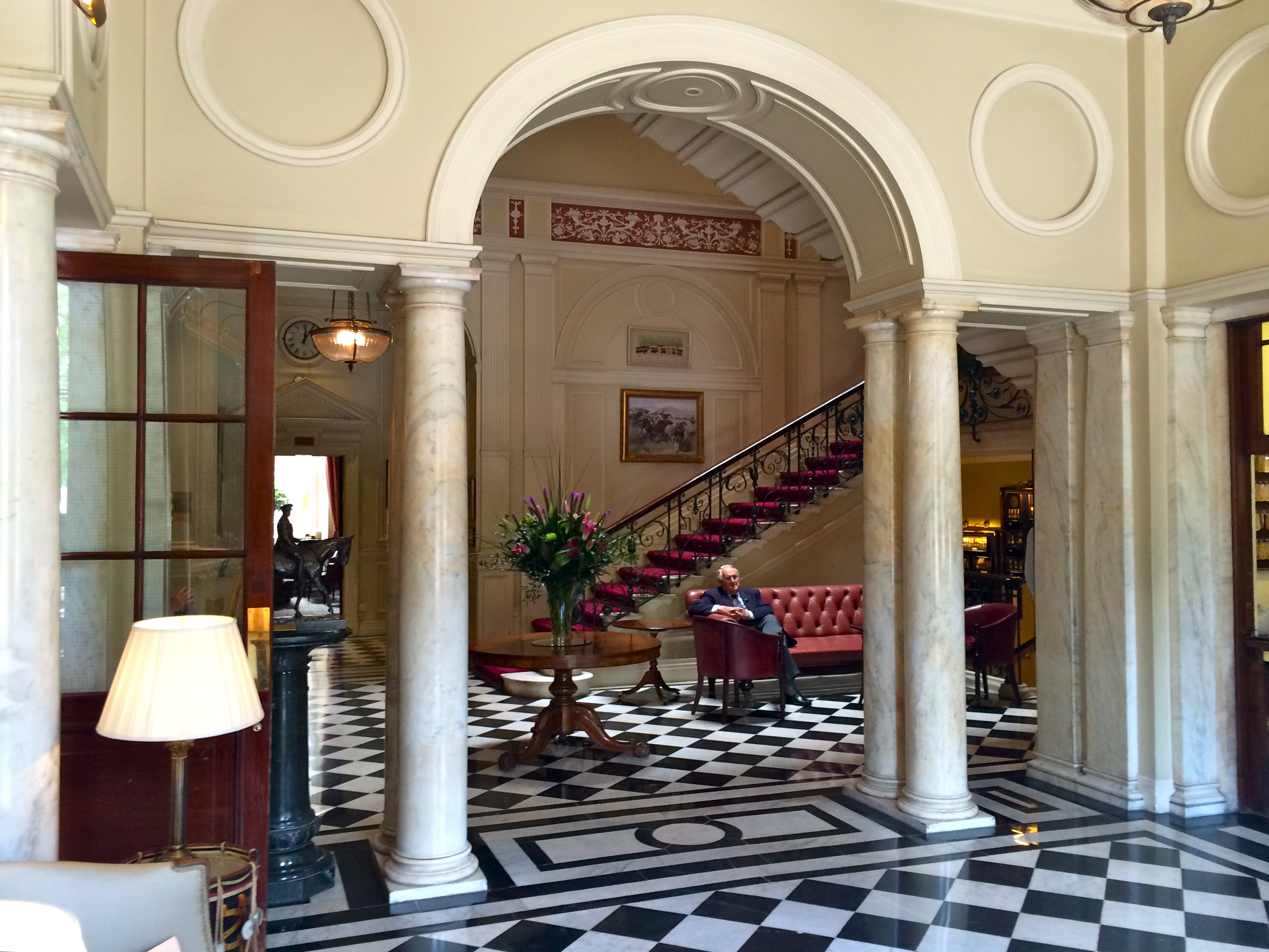
Club interior in 2014

The club narrowly avoided closure in 1987, when its landlord sold the premises on to a property developer, who planned to convert the building into apartments. This was averted through the membership raising the capital to buy the property for the club.

== See also ==
- List of private members clubs in London
