= Cavalry Club =

Gentlemen's club in London, England (1890–1975)

Coordinates: 51.5043°N 0.1482°W

- Founded: 1890
- Defunct: 1975
- Fate: Merged with the Guards Club
- Successor: Cavalry and Guards Club
- Headquarters: 127 Piccadilly, London, England

The Cavalry Club was a London gentlemen's club, which was established in 1890. In 1975, it merged with the Guards' Club, and became the Cavalry and Guards Club, which still exists today.

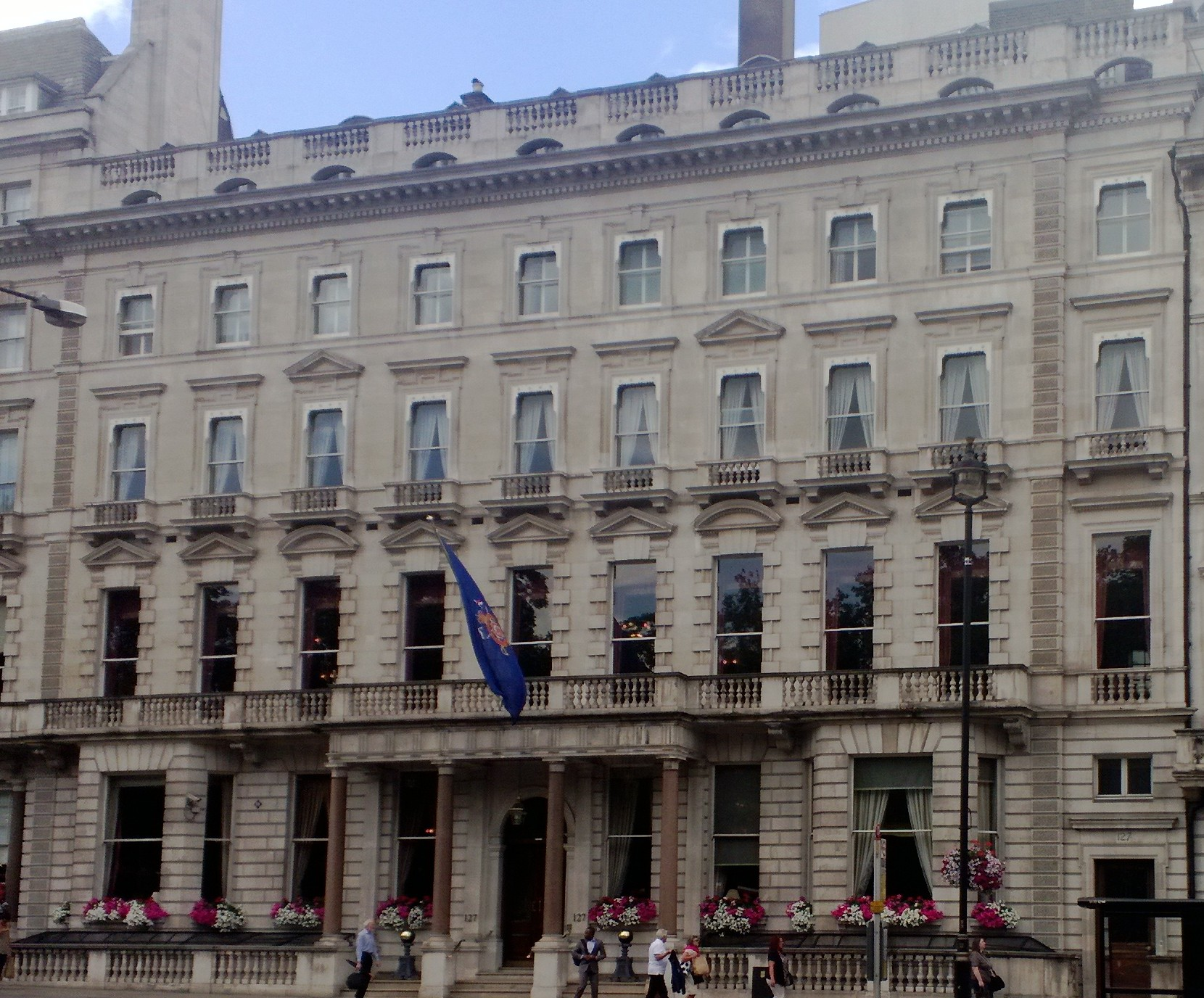
The clubhouse at 127 Piccadilly, designed by Mewès & Davis

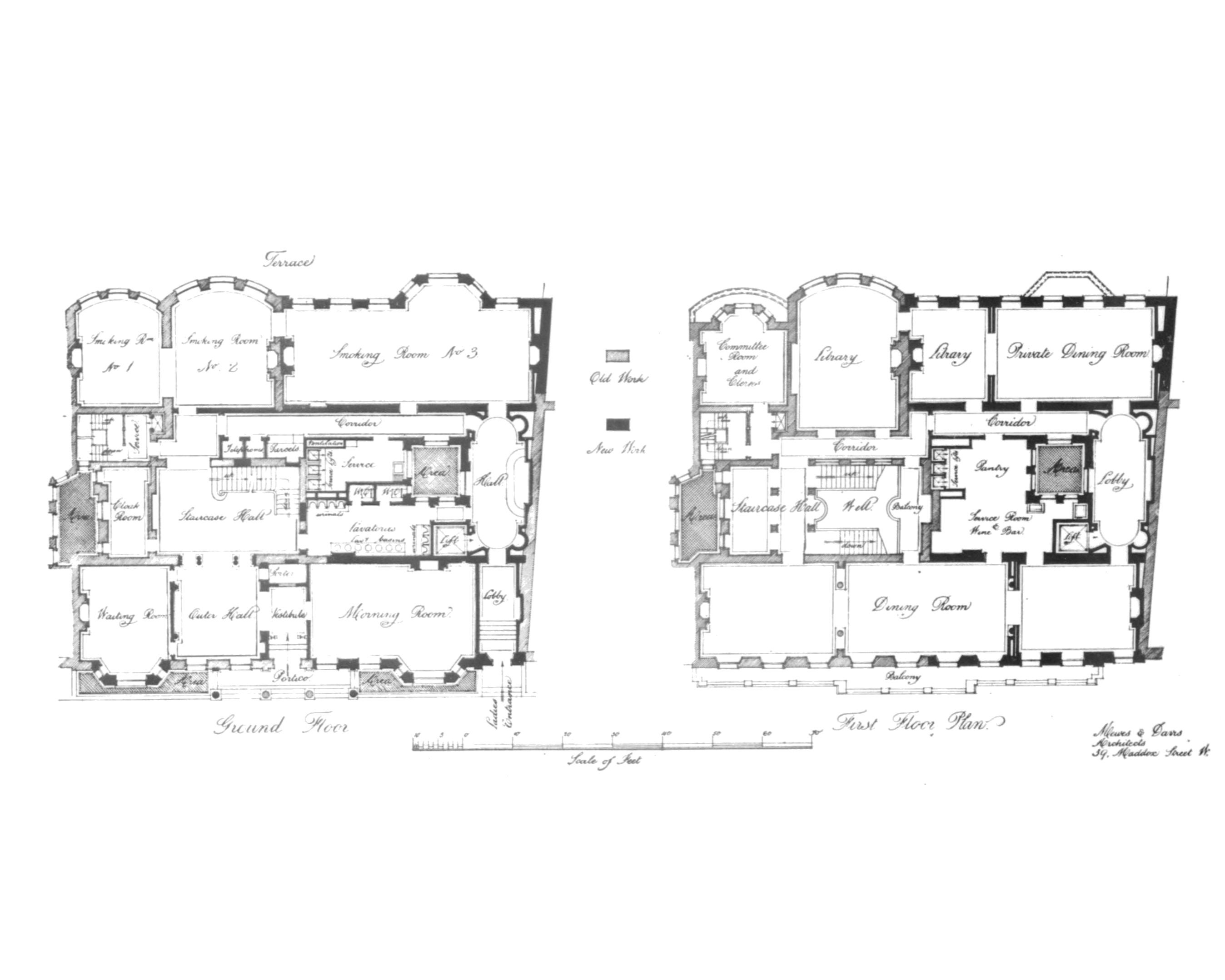
Floor plans of the clubhouse

When the Cavalry Club first occupied the site, on Piccadilly in Mayfair, in 1890, it was a proprietary club owned by an officer in the 20th Hussars, but five years later, ownership passed into the hands of its members and it became a members' club. They raised the funds to build an entirely new clubhouse, which was designed by B. N. H. Orphoot of Mewes and Davies and completed on the site in 1908.

Like many London clubs, both the Cavalry Club and the Guards' Club went through a period of serious financial hardship in the 1970s. The solution proposed was a merger. The Guards' Club was due to close anyway, so their premises closed in 1975, and their 800 members joined the renamed Cavalry Club, also bringing numerous objets d'art with them.

== See also ==
- List of gentlemen's clubs in London
