= Northfield, Edinburgh =

Suburb of Edinburgh, Scotland

Coordinates: 55°56′58″N 3°8′8″W

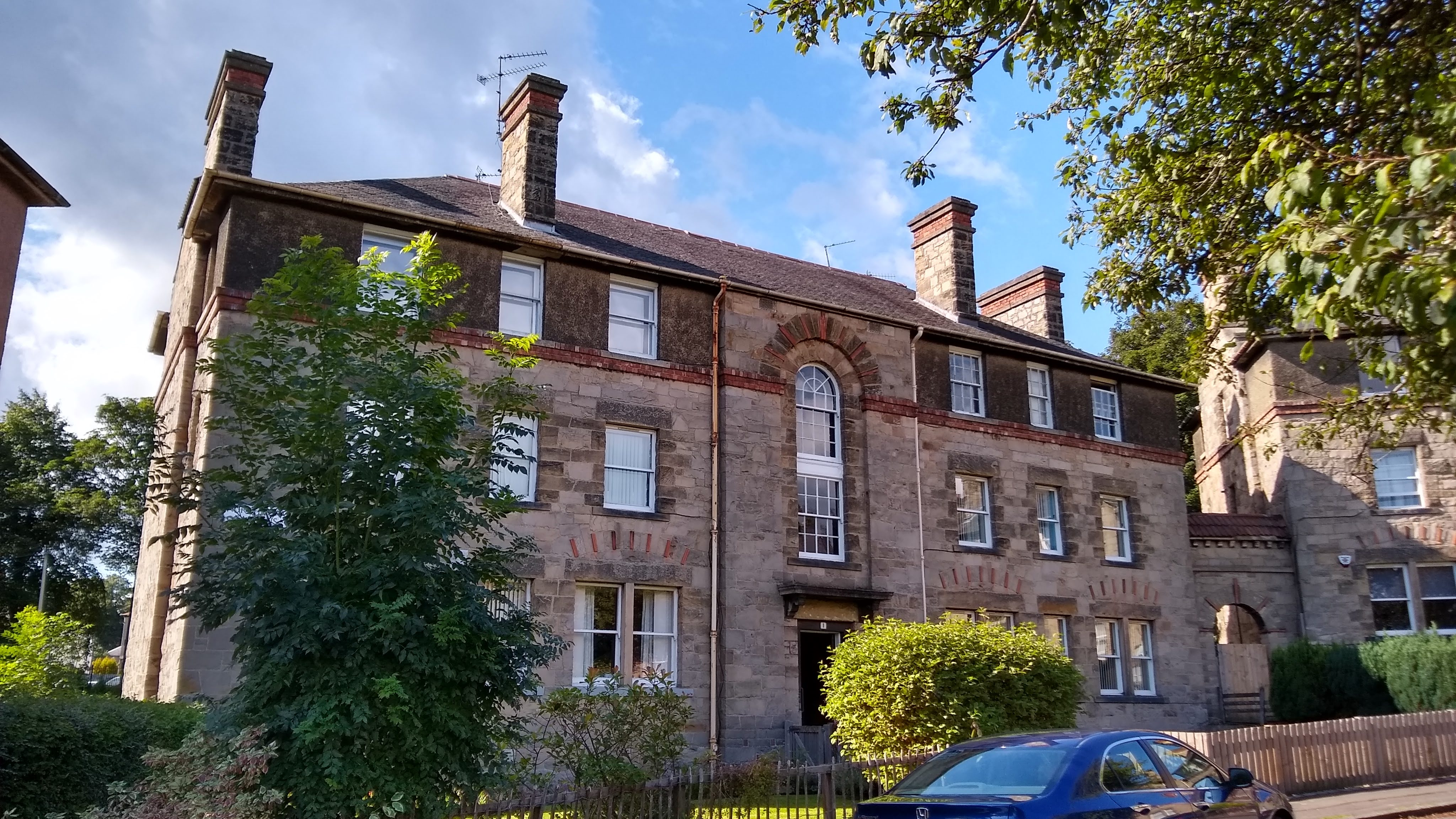
1920s stone tenements (Northfield Gardens)

Northfield is a suburb of Edinburgh, the capital of Scotland. It lies east of the city centre and west of Portobello.

The area was laid out at low densities as local authority housing but the city employed private architects for its design - Reginald Fairlie and Reid and Forbes. It was laid out from 1921 and took around three years to complete.

Due to the high quality of the buildings it was a very popular area for tenants to purchase under the "Right to Buy" scheme and the area is now largely in private ownership.

The quality is also reflected in that several of the groups are now listed buildings.

== History ==
The area was planned out from 1921 following Edinburgh's reorganisation of its boundaries to controversially encompass Portobello, the fiercely independent Leith and certain areas of Midlothian in 1920.

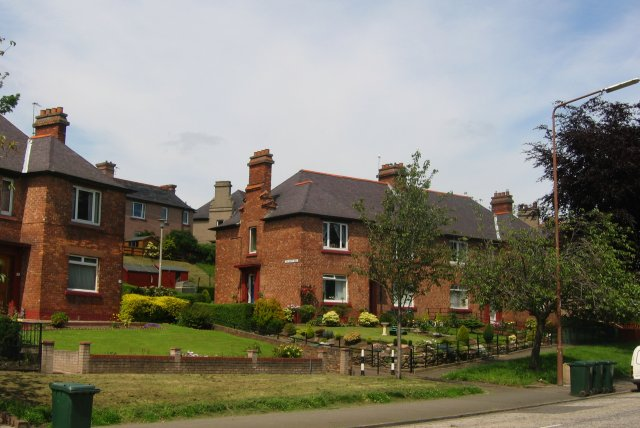
Brick cottage flats (Northfield Broadway)

This area was laid out very generously at very low densities, an attitude seemingly derivative of Edinburgh having gained the land for free. Unusually, although built as Council Housing it was not designed by the city architect, as might be normal but was given as private commission to a prominent local architect, Reginald Fairlie aided by the more practical local firm of Reid and Forbes.

Building began in 1922 and was largely completed in two years.

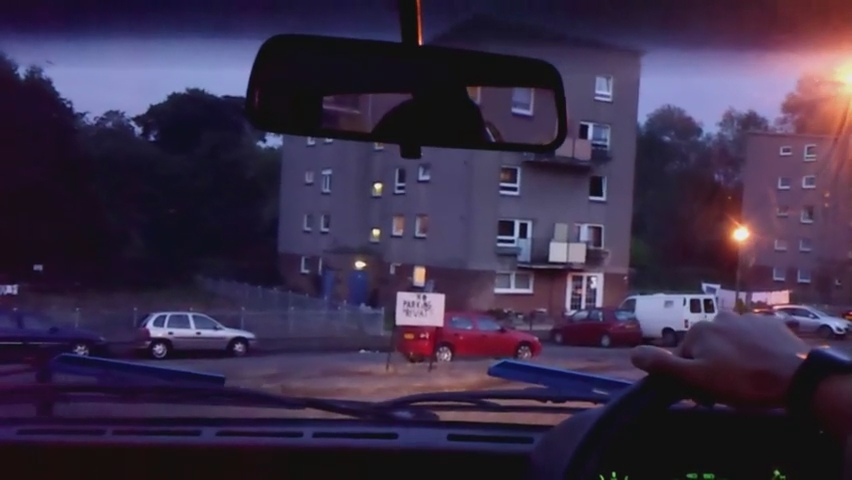
1960s apartments (Northfield Grove)

In the 1960s, a further development of modernist housing was constructed to replace prefabs at nearby Mountcastle.
