= Guards Club =

Gentlemen's club in London, England (1810–1975)

Coordinates: 51°30′21.24″N 0°8′11.1″W

- Founded: 1813
- Defunct: 1975
- Fate: Merged with the Cavalry Club
- Successor: Cavalry and Guards Club

The Guards Club, established in 1810, was a London Gentlemen's club for officers of the Guards Division, originally defined by the club as being the Coldstream Guards, Grenadier Guards or Scots Guards, traditionally the most socially elite section of the British Army. Officers of the Welsh and Irish Guards were not able to join until the second half of the 20th century. Its clubhouse at 70 Pall Mall was the first to be built on that street, which later became noted for its high concentration of clubs; earlier clubs had been focused on the adjoining St James's Street. The clubhouse was designed by Henry Harrison.

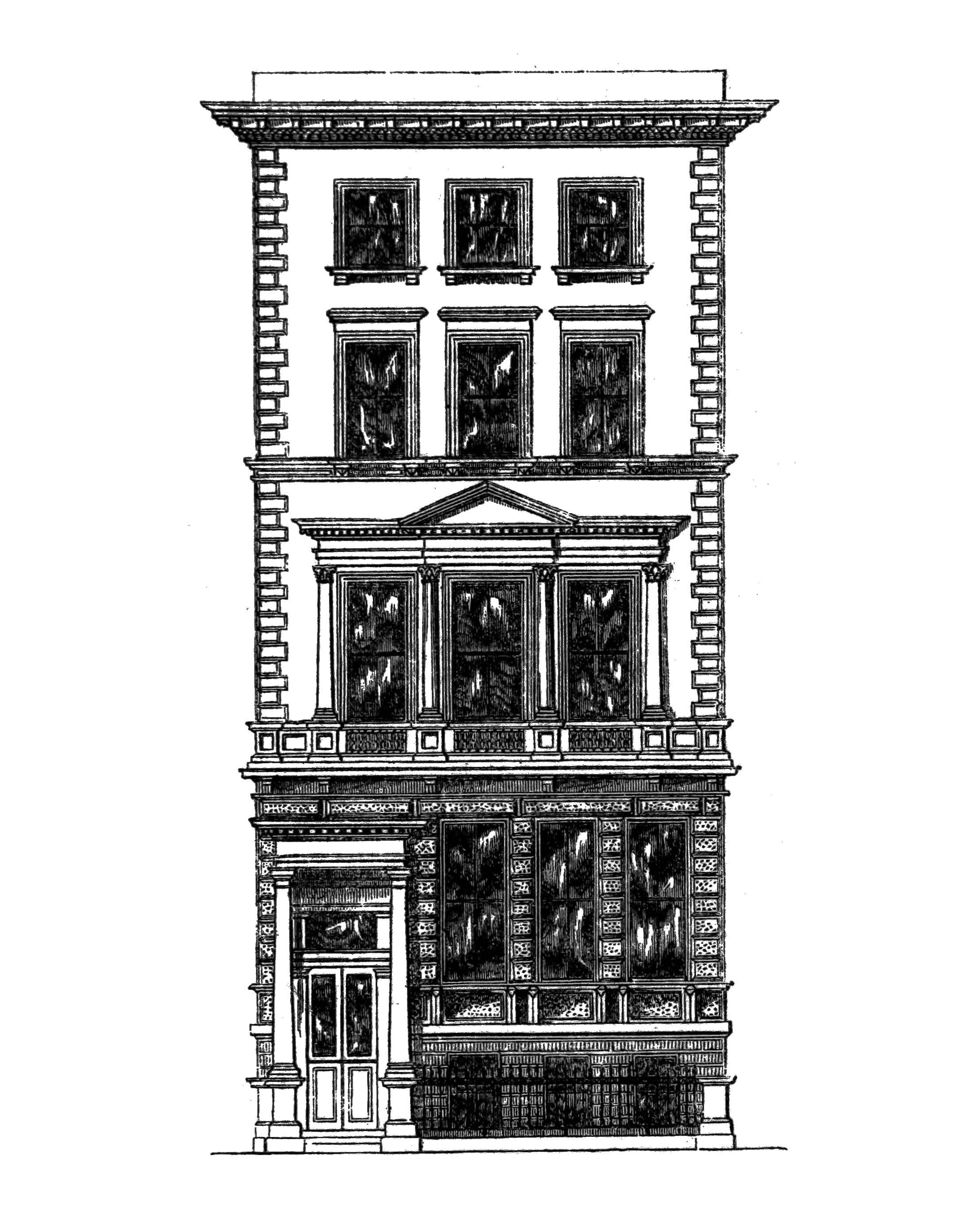
The clubhouse at 70 Pall Mall, designed by Henry Harrison, opened in May 1849. The club vacated the building in 1920, and it was demolished in 1922.

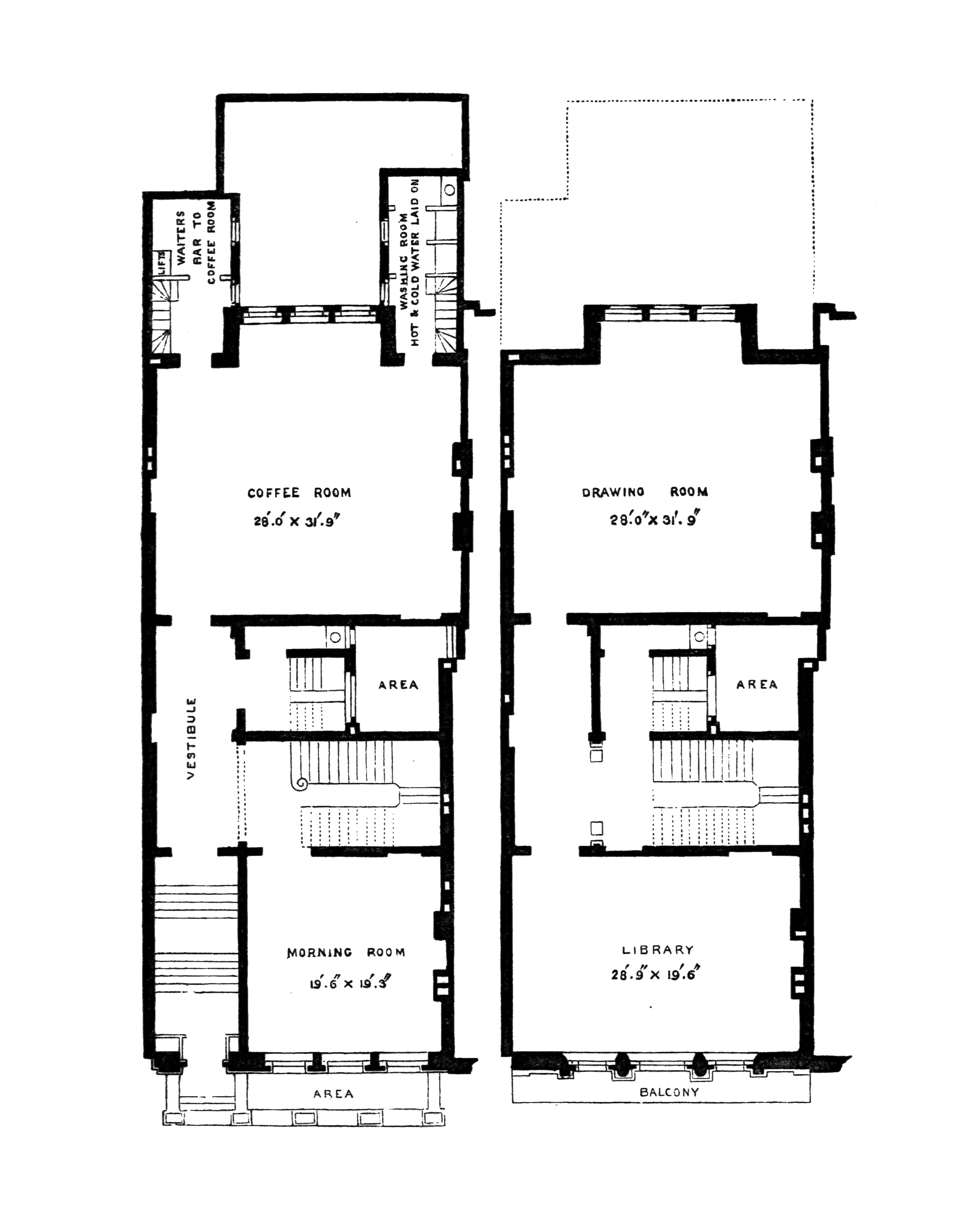
Floor plans of the clubhouse

Stephen Hoare states that: "Three Guards officers, Captain Rees Howell Gronow, Jack Talbot and that well-known acrobatic dandy Colonel Dan MacKinnon established the Guards Club at the St James's Coffee-House at number 88 St James's Street opposite Lock's the hatter. The link between coffee-houses and the club formation remained as strong as it was a century earlier. The establishment provided exactly the kind of relaxing and informal atmosphere where officers home on leave or waiting to be posted could enjoy decent hospitality. In fact, not long afterwards St James's Coffee-House became the St James's Club in 1840. Meanwhile, the Guards Club acquired premises at 49 St. James's Street, opposite Whites, finally moving to a newly commissioned clubhouse at 70 Pall Mall in 1849".

In 1975 it gave up its premises and merged with the Cavalry Club in nearby Piccadilly to form the present-day Cavalry and Guards Club.

== See also ==
- List of London's gentlemen's clubs
- Guards Polo Club
