= University of St Andrews Catholic Chaplaincy =

Catholic chaplaincy in Scotland

The University of St Andrews Catholic Chaplaincy, known as Canmore, houses the Chaplaincy to Catholics at the University of St Andrews. The current chaplain is The Right Reverend Monsignor Patrick Canon Burke, who is also the parish priest.

== Chaplaincy ==
The chaplaincy is based at Canmore, 24 The Scores and opposite the Catholic church of St James.

The chaplaincy has a small chapel dedicated to St Margaret of Scotland, who was married to Malcolm III of Scotland (nicknamed Canmore), where the Blessed Sacrament is reserved. During term-time, Wednesday daily Mass of the parish of St James is celebrated in the chapel.

Weekly talks and other events of the Catholic (Canmore) Society are held at the chaplaincy.

== History ==
Canmore was constructed in 1895 and from 1947 it served as a religious house for the White Fathers and subsequently the Brothers of Christian Instruction. In 1964 it was purchased and placed in a trust to serve as a chaplaincy for university Catholics. For twenty years, from 1973 to 1993, a small community of the Religious of the Assumption were resident on the top floor of the Canmore building, and exercised a pastoral ministry in the university chaplaincy.

Until September 2010, the chaplaincy provided subsidised accommodation for a small number of students. The day-to-day management was overseen by the chaplaincy warden, who was usually either a senior postgraduate student or a university academic. The chaplaincy celebrated its 50th anniversary in November 2014, with an anniversary mass dedicated to the chaplaincy's patron Saint, St Margaret of Scotland. It was led by Archbishop Leo Cushley, Fr Scott Deeley, Fr Michael John Galbraith (the chaplain as of January 2019), and Fr Andrew Kingham (the former chaplain, and chaplain to Catholics at the University of Stirling as of January 2019). In June 2024, Archbishop Leo Cushley announced that The Right Reverend Monsignor Patrick Canon Burke would step down as the Dioceses' Vicar General to become Parish Priest of St James’s, St Andrews, and Chaplain of Canmore.

== List of chaplains ==
- Rev. Fr. I. Thomson Gillan (1953 - ????)
- Rev. Fr. Jock Canon Dalrymple (1970 - 1974)
- Rev. Fr. B. McKean (1974 - 1979)
- Rev. Fr. J. Thompson (1979 - 1983)
- Rev. Fr. Rab McGarrigle (1983 - 1987)
- Rev. Mgr. Brian Canon Halloran, Ph.D. (1987 - 2010)
- Rev. Fr. Andrew Kingham (2010 - 2014)
- Rev. Fr. Michael John Galbraith (2014 - 2024)
- Rt. Rev. Mgr. Patrick J. Canon Burke (2024 - Present)

== See also ==
- Cambridge University Catholic Chaplaincy
- Oxford University Catholic Chaplaincy
- St Albert's Catholic Chaplaincy, Edinburgh
