= Francis Carolus Eeles =

Francis Carolus Eeles OBE (1876 – 17 August 1954, Dunster) was an English liturgical scholar and ecclesiastical historian.

Eeles was on the Advisory Committee of the Warham Guild, established in 1912. He gave the Rhind Lectures in 1914, on The Liturgy and Ceremonial of The Mediaeval Church in Scotland.

Eeles was the first secretary of the Central Council for the Care of Churches, serving as honorary secretary from 1917 and paid secretary from 1926 until his death in 1954. He was made OBE in 1938. In 1939 he began systematically collecting details of English parish churches in order that they might be restored after wartime damage. Eeles bequeathed his books to form the nucleus of the library of the Council for the Care of Churches. His papers are held at the Church of England Record Centre.

He is buried in the churchyard of All Saints at Selworthy, Somerset.

== Works ==
- Traditional ceremonial and customs connected with the Scottish liturgy, 1910
- (ed.) Rentale Dunkeldense : being accounts of the bishopric (A.D. 1505-1517) with Myln's Lives of the bishops (A.D. 1483-1517), 1915
- Ancient stained and painted glass in the churches of Surrey, 1930
- The coronation service, its meaning and history, 1952
