= Regal Cinema, Barnstaple =

Coordinates: 51°04′44″N 4°03′36″W

The Regal Cinema on The Strand in Barnstaple, England, was a prominent independent cinema that opened its doors on 2 January 1939. The venue featured a 30-foot proscenium, a 20-foot-deep stage, and six dressing rooms, and hosted silver-screen entertainment for generations of North Devon residents. Yet it closed down 1 May 1982.

The building's construction was driven by Morris Prince, a prominent regional figure who worked his way up through the early British cinema industry. He paired the Regal on the Strand with the Stranton cinema in nearby Bideford. Together, these two premium North Devon theatres formed what locals fondly referred to as Prince's "little empire".

The physical location of the Regal Cinema had deep theatrical roots. Long before the cinema was built, the site was partly occupied by Barnstaple's early Theatre Royal, which closed down around 1832. The old theatre structure was used as a warehouse for decades until the land was cleared for the Regal. Echoes of this past remain in local geography, as the cinema was built fronting the Strand, but with its side elevation running directly along Theatre Lane.

While the exterior was a stately Neo-Georgian white stone designed to blend in with the Strand's traditional architectures, the interior was an entirely different world. Stepping inside revealed a pure Art Deco auditorium. It was a massive single-screen venue built to hold 1,839 patrons, split between 1,165 seats in the stalls and 674 up in the circle balcony.

For the first few decades, the cinema was independently operated and locally run. However, on 28 August 1962, it was officially renamed the ABC after being fully absorbed into the Associated British Cinemas circuit. For the final twenty years of its cinematic life, generations of locals knew its strictly as the ABC rather than the Regal.

During the late 1970s, as cinema audiences dwindled across the UK, there were intense industry rumours that the building's vast auditorium would be carved up and divided into multiple smaller screens to survive. Ultimately, these plans fell through. The ABC proudly resisted the multiplex trend and stayed a grand single-screen theatre until its very last commercial film screening in 1982.

== Later uses ==
=== The snooker era ===
In 1983, the building was converted into a snooker club alongside retail space. Converting grand high-ceiling former cinemas into snooker halls was a massive trend across the United Kingdom during the 1980s, capitalizing on the sudden British boom in the sport's popularity.

=== The nightclub era ===
The building is perhaps most fondly remembered by locals for its long life as a prominent town nightclub. The sprawling auditorium proved to be an ideal space for a dance floor and sound system.

It went by a long succession of different names:

- Babylon
- Rockabillies
- Coco
- Club Tropicana
- Kaos
- The Venue
- The Worx (its final incarnation)

=== Recent status ===
The building finally stopped operating in April 2019. Shortly after its closure, the iconic building was put up for sale on the commercial property market for £225,000, marking the end of it its multi-generational run as an entertainment venue.
