= Bridge of Tynet =

Hamlet in Moray, Scotland

Coordinates: 57.638462961871°N 3.03344928446°W

Bridge of Tynet: Scots: Brig o Tynet
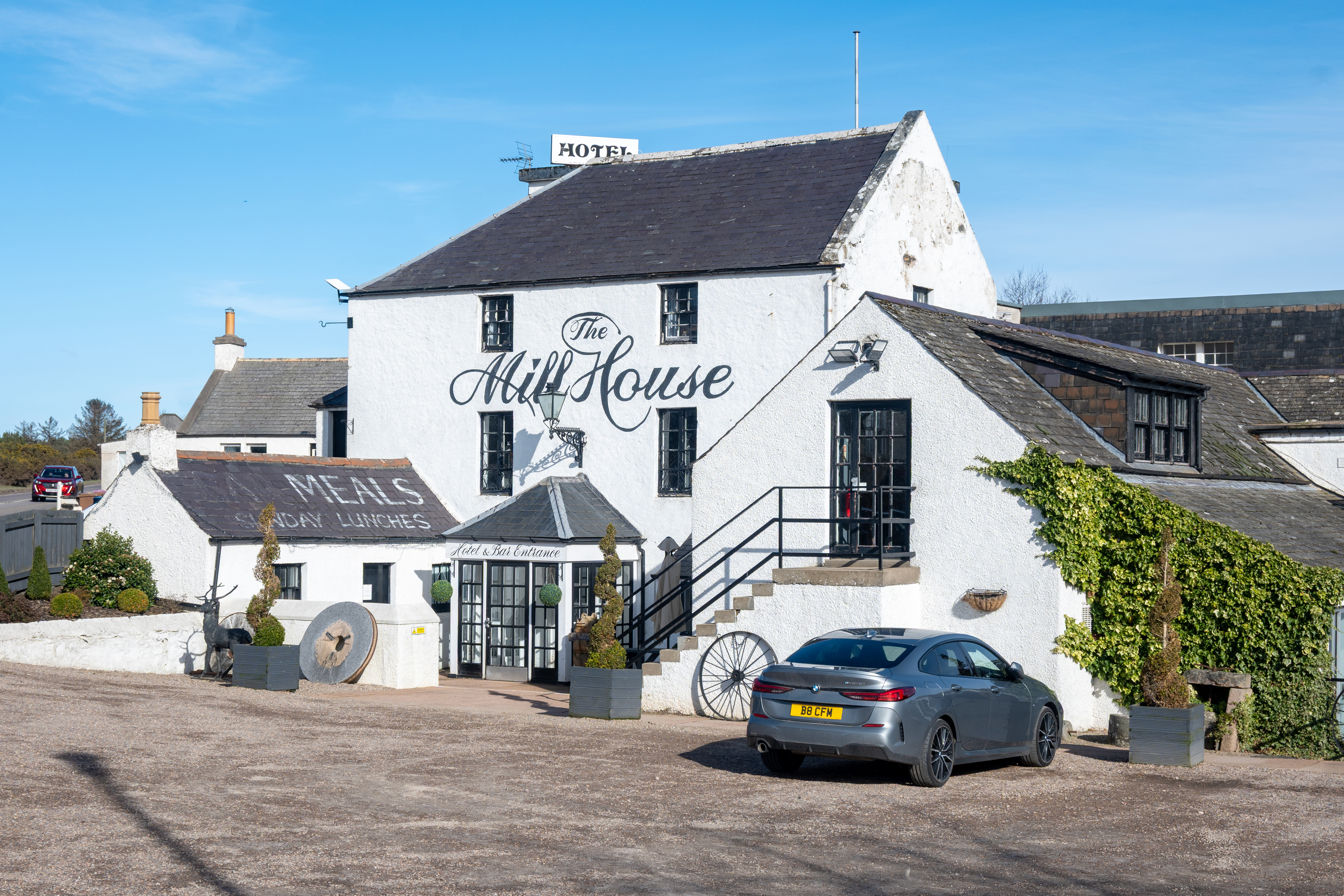
- Mill House Hotel

- Location within Moray
- Council area: Moray
- Lieutenancy area: Moray
- Country: Scotland
- Sovereign state: United Kingdom
- Police: Scotland
- Fire: Scottish
- Ambulance: Scottish

Bridge of Tynet (or Tynet for short) is a hamlet in Moray, Scotland located about 2.8 miles (4.5 kilometres) south-west of Buckie.
