= St James Church, St Andrews =

Church in Fife, Scotland

Coordinates: 56°20′35″N 2°47′51″W

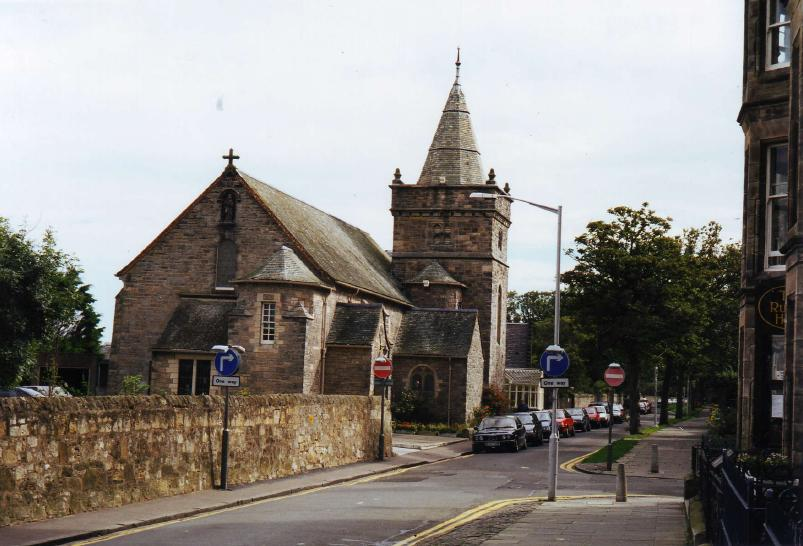
St James Church in St Andrews, 1997

St James is a small Roman Catholic church at 17 The Scores (next to the seashore) in St Andrews, Fife, Scotland. The church was designed by Reginald Fairlie and built in 1910, replacing a former 'tin' church, and is a Category B listed building.

As of summer 2024 the Parish Priest is Msgr Patrick Burke who is also honorary Roman Catholic Chaplain to the University of St Andrews.
