= Reginald Fairlie =

Scottish architect (1883–1952)

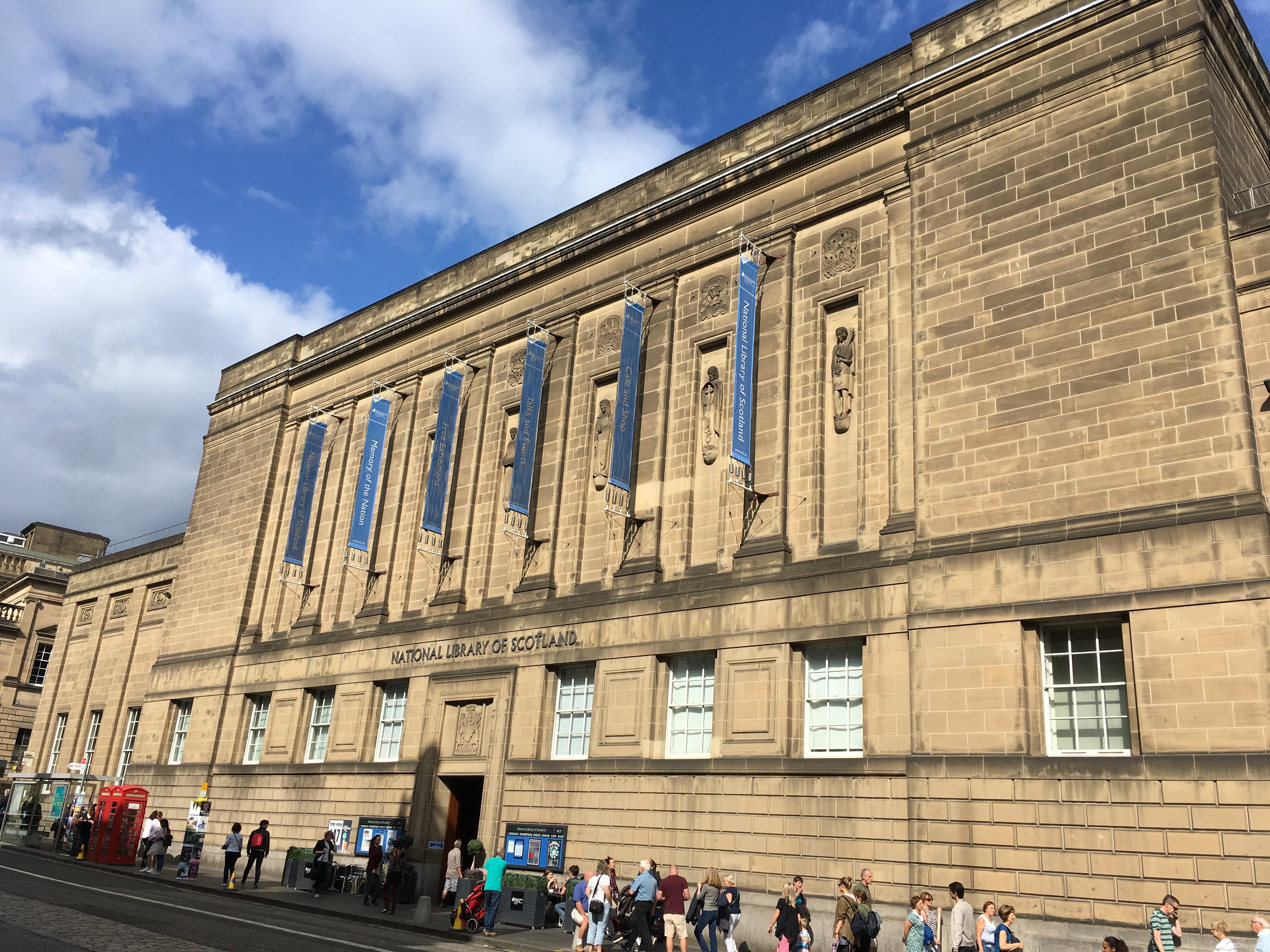
National Library of Scotland, 1938-1956

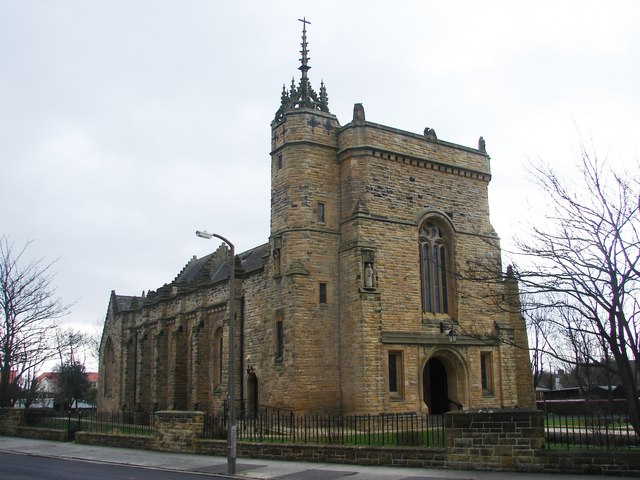
Church of Our Lady of the Assumption and St Meddan, Troon, Ayrshire

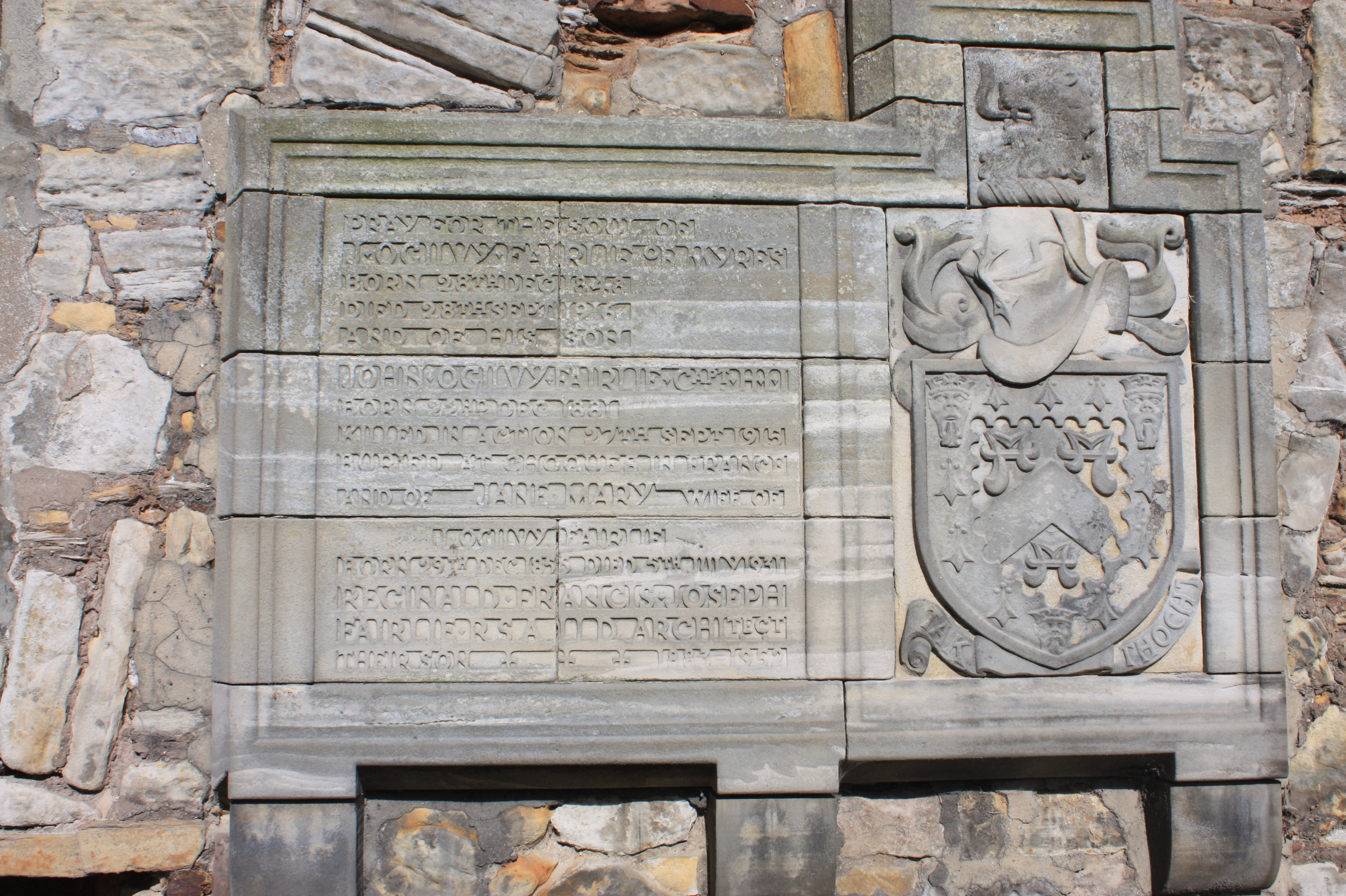
The grave of Reginald Fairlie, Eastern Cemetery, St Andrews

Reginald Francis Joseph Fairlie FRSE FRIAS FRIBA RSA LLD (7 March 1883 – 27 October 1952) was a Scottish architect. He served as a commissioner of RCAHMS and on the Ancient Monuments Board for Scotland.

== Life ==
Born at Kincaple, Fife, he was the son of J. Ogilvy Fairlie of Myres (1848–1916) and Jane Mary Fairlie. He was educated at the Oratory School in Birmingham.

He was apprenticed to Robert Lorimer in 1901, and much of his style echoes that of Lorimer. Ian Gordon Lindsay trained under him (1927–30).

A faithful Roman Catholic, Fairlie designed many war memorials, churches and restorations of castles. From a long list of commissions, only a handful fall outside the borders of Scotland.

He set up office at 14 Randolph Place in 1908.

He served in Royal Engineers in World War I. His older brother John Ogilvy Fairlie was killed in action on 25 September 1915. With the death of his father on 28 September 1916, Reginald fell heir to the family estate of Myres. In the early 1920s he designed a series of war memorials, largely working with the sculptor Alexander Carrick.

After the war (around 1920) he joined forces briefly with the architects Reid and Forbes and worked on some award winning housing schemes including Northfield in Edinburgh. He set up his own office at 7 Ainslie Place (which was also his home) in 1925 but remained linked with Reid and Forbes until 1926.

Curiously, James Smith Forbes of Reid and Forbes lodged with Fairlie even after the end of their business partnership. His neighbour at 7 Ainslie Place was Francis Cadell the artist, and they became friends and remained so even after Cadell moved house. He was also close friends with the sculptor Hew Lorimer, whom he met during his connection with Robert Lorimer as Hew was his second son. He pulled Hew into some of his projects, including the prestigious National Library project, where Hew provided the figurative sculpture on the frontage. From 1930 to 1935 Schomberg Scott worked in his office as a junior.

He generously passed the commission for the restoration of Iona Abbey to his friend and employee Ian Gordon Lindsay in 1938.

Fairlie lived the life of a bachelor, with a personal servant, Robertson, serving him faithfully until death in 1938. He leased Inchrye Abbey from 1931 to 1939 for shooting parties and falconry. Work ceased on most projects during World War II, including his major commission for the National Library. The work on the library did not resume until 1950.

In 1946 Fairlie was elected a fellow of the Royal Society of Edinburgh. His proposers were Sir David Russell, Sir James C Irvine, Sir Ernest Wedderburn, and Robert James Douglas Graham.

Fairlie died in St. Raphael’s Nursing Home in the Grange, Edinburgh, but was buried with his parents in the Eastern Cemetery in St Andrews. His grave stone was carved by his friend Hew Lorimer. It lies on the eastern wall, towards the south-east corner.

== Achievements ==
Fairlie rose to the position of chairman of the Directorate of Ancient Monuments.

In 1933 he became elected a full member of the Royal Scottish Academy.

In 1937 he received a doctorate from the University of St Andrews (LLD) for his work on St Salvator’s Chapel there.

He was also a member of the Royal Fine Art Commission and the Forestry Commission.

== Principal works ==
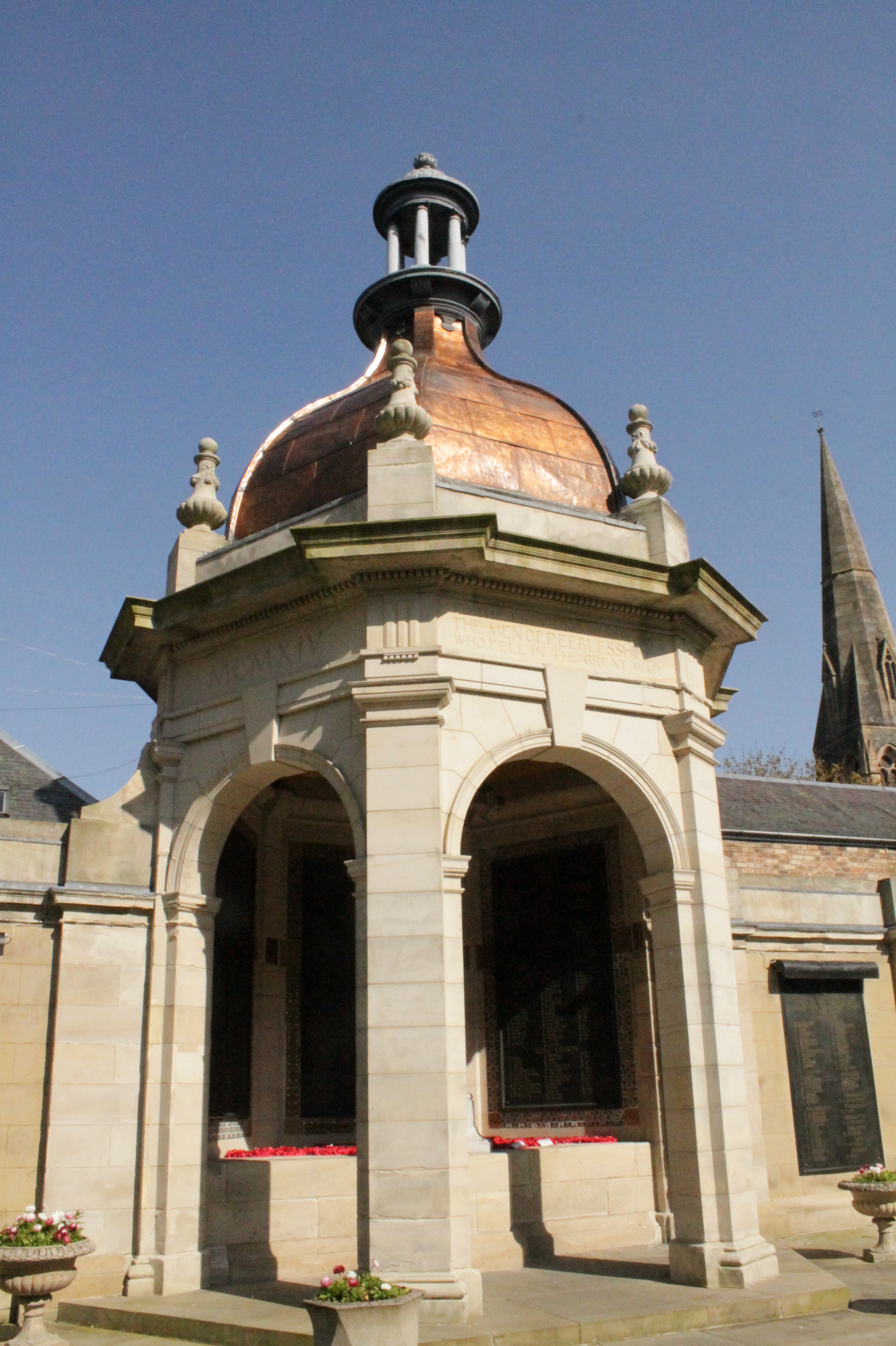
Peebles War Memorial

His works include:

- Our Lady of the Assumption and St Meddan, Troon, listed as Category A. 1909-1911.
- St James Church, St Andrews, 1910
- Housing scheme in Moffat, 1921 (with Reid and Forbes)
- Housing scheme in Northfield, Edinburgh, 1921 (with Reid and Forbes)
- Restoration of Hutton Castle, 1926
- Side chapels of St Mary, Our Lady of Victories Church, Dundee, 1926
- Cloister at Kelso Abbey, 1933
- Scottish Classroom, one of the Nationality Rooms at the Cathedral of Learning, University of Pittsburgh, 1938
- National Library of Scotland, Edinburgh, 1938–56

== Memorials by Fairlie ==
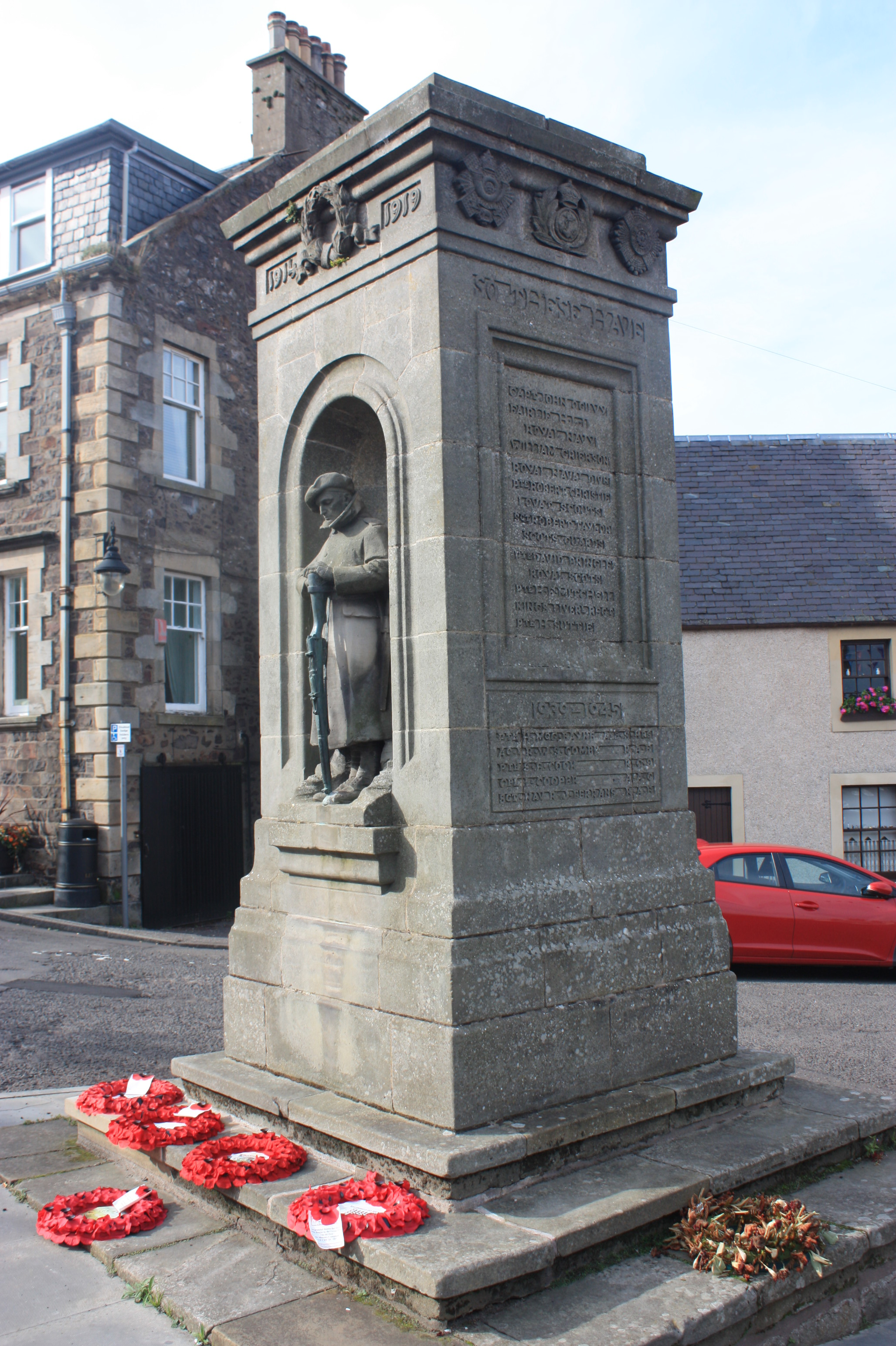
Auchtermuchty War Memorial

Memorials he designed include:

- Kinclaven War Memorial, 1919
- Moffat War Memorial, 1919
- Peebles War Memorial, 1919
- Auchtermuchty War Memorial, 1920
- Blairgowrie War Memorial, 1920
- Monzievaird and Strachan War Memorial, 1920
- Tomb of Canon Lyle, St Joseph's RC Church, Peebles, 1920
- Memorial Chapel (Lady Chapel) Dunblane Cathedral c.1922
