= Church Buildings Council =

The Central Council for the Care of Churches of the Church of England was formed in 1917, developing from the Central Committee for the Protection of English Churches under the Archbishops' Council. It became the Church Buildings Council in 2007, after having joined the Cathedrals Fabric Commission for England.

Francis Carolus Eeles was the first honorary secretary from 1917, and served as paid secretary from 1926 until his death in 1954. Judith Scott was general secretary from 1957 to 1971, and Peter Burman was general secretary from 1977 to 1990.

The body produced a series of reports on its work which were published by the Church Information Office.
