= John Rankine Barclay =

Scottish painter

- Born: 22 October 1884; Edinburgh, Scotland
- Died: on or after 22 October 1964 (aged 80); St Ives, Cornwall, England
- Known for: Oils, Watercolours
- Awards: Guthrie Award, 1922

John Rankine Barclay (9 April 1884 – on or after 22 October 1964) was a Scottish painter, born in Edinburgh. He won the third annual Guthrie Award in 1922 with his work, the oil painting The Artist's Wife.

== Life ==
John Rankine Barclay was born in Edinburgh. His parents were James Weston Barclay (19 July 1859 - 20 March 1935) and Mary Rankine (c. 1860 - 24 February 1936). They had married in Kirkcaldy in 1881. John was one of their 4 sons.

At 16, Barclay was recorded on the 1901 census as an engraver's apprentice.

He moved to Cornwall in 1935, staying at Zennor.

It is noted that towards the end of his life he was suffering mental illness.

== Art ==
Barclay trained at the Edinburgh College of Art from 1908. He was awarded a travelling bursary at the college and went to France and Spain.

Barclay exhibited with the Royal Scottish Academy from 1910 with his first exhibit A Wood In Winter. In 1911 his two works The Laundress and The Dockyard at Dusk; 1912 Jardin Du Luxembourg and The Church Tower, Dordrecht; 1913 Miss Jeanie Gardner Sinclair and Monty and March.

He met Alick Riddell Sturrock; and he and Sturrock then joined the 'Edinburgh Group' that included David Macbeth Sutherland, William Oliphant Hutchison, William Mervyn Glass, John Guthrie Spence Smith and Dorothy Johnstone; as a group of progressive painters. The Edinburgh Group exhibited at their Edinburgh Exhibition of 1919, with Barclay's work drawing plaudits from E. A. Taylor.

After he won the Guthrie Award in 1922 he exhibited at the RSA in 1923 with A Dance Hall and Betty; in 1924 with Green And Black; in 1925 The Riverside and A Breton Landscape; and in 1926 The Minister Of Currie; and in 1927 Arpeggios, and 1928 Dorothy MacDonald.

His Edinburgh addresses chopped and changed throughout the late 1920s and early 1930s but he continued to exhibit in Scotland. He exhibited in 1934 at the RSA at his last Edinburgh address 136 Gilmore Place with the work On The Marne.

Right up to the start of the Second World War, Barclay continued to exhibit with the RSA but with an address now in Tregarthen, St Ives, in Cornwall. In 1937 his works Road To Land's End and Rotten Row, Hyde Park and The Canal Bank; in 1938 he submitted Sunday Morning At Hammersmith; and in 1939 he submitted his last pieces Northerly Gale Over Cornwall and Windsor Great Park.

He joined the St. Ives Society of Artists after the Second World War, becoming its Secretary in 1939.

== Death ==
His death is on the English civil registration death index register, volume 7a, page 105 as being in the last quarter of 1964, in the October to December period, marked in the Penzance region where St Ives sits. His age is recorded as 80 years old death, which means he died on or after his 80th birthday on 22 October 1964.

== Works ==
His works include Kirkcudbright and Zennor Village; Cornish Scoutmaster. and Fisherman On A Quayside

Stoke-on-Trent Museum and Art Gallery have his work The Pont Neuf.
