= David McClure (artist) =

Scottish artist and lecturer

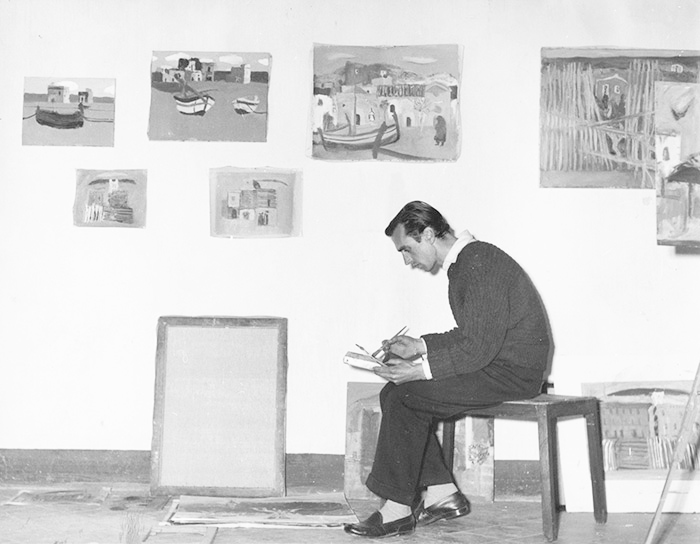
- David McClure, Casteldaccia, Sicily 1956.
- Born: David McClure; 20 February 1926; Lochwinnoch, Scotland
- Died: 20 February 1998 (aged 72); Dundee, Scotland
- Education: Edinburgh College of Art
- Known for: Painting, drawing, printmaking
- Awards: Guthrie Award, 1956

Signature
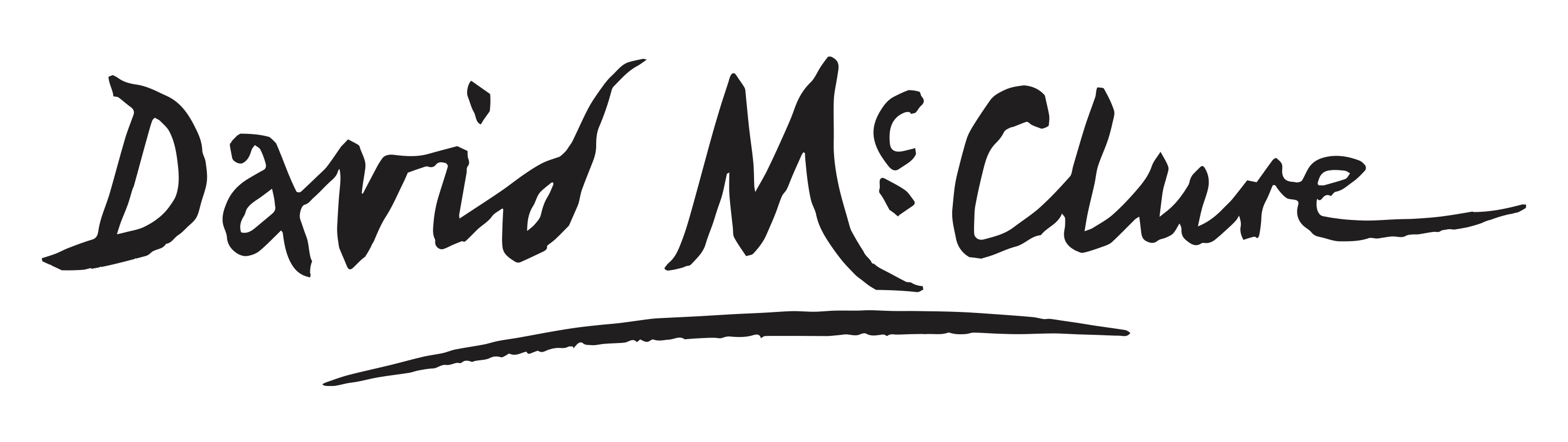

David McClure RSA RSW (20 February 1926 – 20 February 1998) was a Scottish artist and lecturer. He is most well known for his paintings of still lifes, interiors, figures and family portraits as well as his landscape and townscape paintings of Scotland, Italy, Sicily and Spain where he lived and travelled throughout his life.

Born in Lochwinnoch in 1926, McClure graduated in the early 1950s from Edinburgh College of Art. In his early career he spent significant periods working in Spain, Italy, Sicily and later Norway. He spent the majority of professional life in Dundee where he lived with his wife and family and taught at Duncan of Jordanstone College of Art (now part of the University of Dundee) from 1958 and spent the last two years of his career there as head of painting, a post he took over from his friend, colleague and fellow artist, Alberto Morrocco, before retiring in 1985.

== Early life and education ==
McClure was born in Lochwinnoch in 1926 and attended Queen's Park School in Glasgow. During the Second World War David served as a Bevin Boy in the mines of West Lothian. Some of his earliest known works depict these times; mining scenes and portraits of the miners themselves as well as surrealist and cubist landscapes depicting pitheads and bings, richly influenced by the works of Graham Sutherland. Previously he had been studying English and History at Glasgow University but his mining experiences seemed to have help determine that an already strong interest in the visual arts developed into a need to paint. On his father's side of the family were several generations of Lochwinnoch furniture designers and manufacturers; many of the great, Clyde-built liners were fitted out with Lochwinnoch furniture and decorative woodwork. His father, Robert, in his spare time was active in the local art society and went to drawing classes, even painting portraits of locals' prize pets or racing pigeons. David first enrolled in the Fine Art course at Edinburgh, his time divided between History of Art at the University of Edinburgh and Drawing and Painting at the Art College. Tellingly, after a year, he moved solely to the Art College and to painting.

McClure studied at Edinburgh College of Art from the late 1940s, where his contemporaries included Elizabeth Blackadder, John Houston and David Michie and where students came under the influences of the major Edinburgh figures of the time such as Anne Redpath, William Gillies, John Maxwell, William MacTaggart and Robert Henderson Blyth. His art was inspired by his regard for the French Post-Impressionists masters such as Matisse, Gauguin, Picasso, Braque, Chagall and Redon, in a long-standing Scottish tradition. Always informed by an intellectual rigour and reference to the wider history of art, literature and music, it is generally celebratory of the positive things in life and nature.

== Travel and work ==
In 1952 McClure was awarded a Travelling Scholarship by the Art College which saw him working in France, Spain and Italy. In 1955 they awarded him an Andrew Grant Scholarship which led to a period of travelling and painting in Scotland, Florence and Sicily where he concentrated on landscape and townscape scenes with some still life painting. After Sicily, McClure returned to Scotland where he taught at Edinburgh College of Art, while continuing to paint. During this period he was commissioned as the artist involved in the reconstruction of the King's room at Falkland Palace, Fife where his murals and ceiling paintings can still be seen today. In 1957 a gouache Moon, Santa Zita of the Basilica of San Frediano in Lucca, Italy, was included as one of the 'Young Artists of Promise' in Jack Beddington's book.

The rest of his professional life was spent in Dundee, where he lived with his family and taught from 1958 at Duncan of Jordanstone College of Art (now part of the University of Dundee), where he earned a reputation as an inspirational and caring teacher. McClure had a strong adherence to the core values of sound drawing, the importance of tradition, art history, and learning the craft of painting. He found time to work with students who were less gifted and was appreciated for his rigorous intellect which made an impact on the college. He is remembered at Duncan of Jordanstone for opening the minds of staff and students alike and spent the last two years of his career there as head of painting a post he took over from his great friend, colleague and fellow Scottish artist, Alberto Morrocco, before retiring in 1985. After his retirement from College, David continued to paint full-time in his studio at the family home at Strawberry Bank, Dundee. During this period he periodically suffered from ill-health, but not until the very end did this affect his painting indeed in his last years he produced what some regard as some of the finest, direct landscapes of his career inspired by summer visits to North-West Sutherland. Such was his determination and commitment to his art that he had an oxygen cylinder rigged up in his studio with a lengthy lead and mask.

== Family life ==
McClure married Joyce Flanigan in 1950 and they had three children Robin, Paola and Kevin. David remarried in 1991 to artist and former model Angela Bradbury who he lived with for the remainder of his life. David died peacefully on his 72nd birthday at the family home at Strawberry Bank, Dundee in 1998.

== Collections ==
David McClure's paintings are held by a number of public and private collections across the UK which include:

- Aberdeen Art Gallery
- Argyll Education Committee
- University of Dundee
- Dundee Museum and Art Gallery
- National Galleries of Scotland
- National Trust for Scotland
- Edinburgh College of Art - University of Edinburgh
- City Art Centre Edinburgh
- Royal Scottish Academy
- University of St Andrews
- University of Stirling
- Glasgow Art Gallery
- Perth Art Gallery
- Paisley Museum and Art Gallery
- The Fleming Collection
- Royal Dutch Shell
- Bank of Scotland
- British Rail
- BBC Scotland
- Edinburgh Fund Managers
- Towner Art Gallery
- University of Birmingham
