= Ian Fleming (artist) =

Scottish painter

- Born: 19 November 1906; Glasgow, Scotland
- Died: 24 July 1994 (aged 87); Aberdeen, Scotland
- Known for: Etching, engraving, oils, watercolours
- Awards: Guthrie Award, 1938
- Elected: Royal Scottish Academy, 1956

Ian Fleming (19 November 1906 – 24 July 1994) was a Scottish painter, born in Glasgow. He won the Guthrie Award in 1938 with his work The Painters: McBryde and Colquhoun. The painting is now at the Glasgow School of Art.

== Life ==
Ian Fleming was born in Glasgow as John Fleming, though he was always known as Ian. His parents were John Fleming (died 1939) a painter and decorator, and Catherine McLean (died 1970). Catherine was from Tiree and was a Gaelic speaker.

Fleming went to Church Street Primary School and then Hyndland Secondary School before going on to the Glasgow School of Art.

Fleming married Catherine Weetch in 1943. They had 3 children.

Fleming studied at Jordanhill Teacher Training College; then taught at Glasgow School of Art.

During the Second World War he was first a reserve policeman in Glasgow; and then joined the Pioneer Corps in their thrust from Normandy to Germany. He was demobbed in 1946 as Acting-Major.

Fleming re-joined the Glasgow School of Art in 1946. He then moved to Arbroath in 1948 as the warden of the Patrick Allan-Fraser Art College. Then in 1954, he moved north again to Gray's School of Art, Aberdeen. He revamped and energised the whole school:- moving it to a proper college setting in Garthdee; creating a library; and made a bigger department of printmaking; and gave it a much bigger curriculum. He also encouraged students to go the School of Art in Aberdeen when visiting all of Aberdeen's schools.

Fleming was the local chairman of the Saltire Society in Aberdeen. He was also a Rotarian. He said for recreation in Who's Who was to be 'anything Scottish'.

== Art ==
Fleming was at the Glasgow School of Art from 1924 to 1929. Later as a member of staff he painted the portrait of the two students Robert Colquhoun and Robert McBryde. It was that portrait that won the Guthrie Award in 1938.

Fleming first exhibited in the Royal Glasgow Institute of the Fine Arts exhibition in 1927; and in the Royal Scottish Academy in 1930.

Fleming was a member of the Royal Scottish Society of Painters in Watercolour in 1947.

Fleming was elected associate member of the RSA in 1947 and a full member in 1956.

Fleming revived the Aberdeen Artists Society after arriving in Aberdeen. It had been dormant since the start of the Second World War. It now has an annual exhibition in Aberdeen Art Gallery.

== Death ==
Fleming died on 24 July 1994. He died of kidney failure in his home in Aberdeen.

== Works ==
Harbour Pattern is in the Grampian Hospital Arts Trust.

A portrait of the artist is in the National Galleries of Scotland, and another is in the RSA collection.

The Wallace Tower, Aberdeen is in the Blairs Museum, near Aberdeen.

His Fishermen is in the Scottish Maritime Museum.
