= David Michie =

Scottish artist (1928–2015)

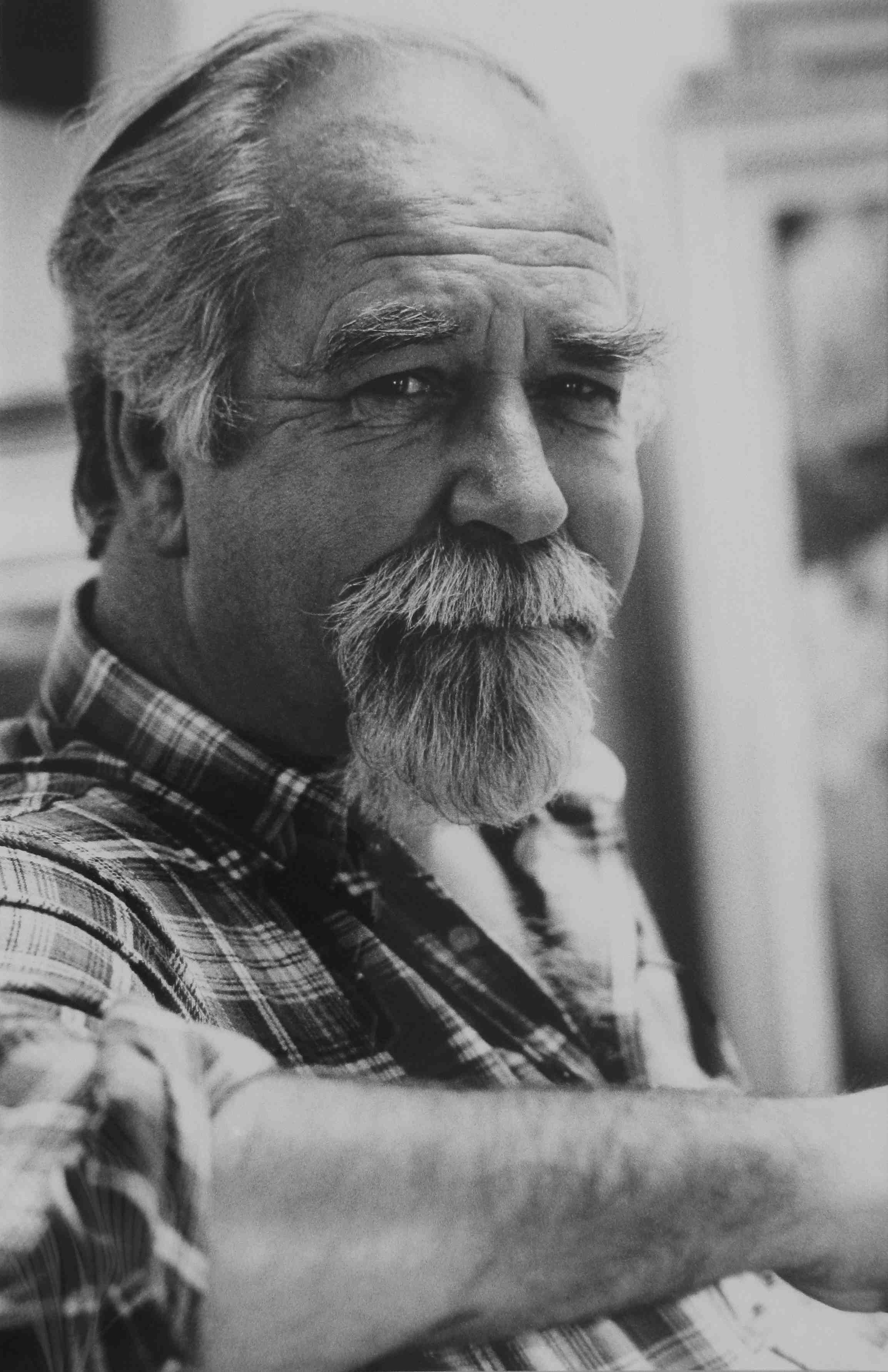
- David Michie, 1995 (Photo Eric Thorburn)
- Born: David Alan Redpath Michie; 30 November 1928; Saint-Raphaël, Var, France
- Died: 24 August 2015 (aged 86); Edinburgh, Scotland
- Education: Edinburgh College of Art
- Known for: Painting, oils, watercolour
- Awards: Guthrie Award, 1960 (joint winner)

David Michie OBE, RSA, PSSA, FRSA, RGI (30 November 1928 – 24 August 2015) was a Scottish artist of international stature.

== Life ==
The third son of the architect and painter James Beattie Michie, and the renowned Scottish artist Anne Redpath, he was born in 1928 in Saint-Raphaël, in the Var département in the south of France. David was the younger brother of the painter and sculptor Alastair Michie, His father had a position there as private architect to Charles Thomson, a wealthy American, and the Michie family lived in the boathouse of his villa, the Chateau Gloria. After Charles Thomson suffered losses in the Crash of 1929, the decline in his fortunes eventually brought an end to the Michie family's life there, and in 1934 David returned with his mother and brothers to Hawick, his mother's home town in the Scottish Borders. From the age of six he attended primary school at Hawick, before going on to Hawick High School.

In 1946, he went from school to Edinburgh College of Art (ECA), but his time there was interrupted when he was called up, following the introduction of National Service in 1947, to serve two years in the Signals Corps, mostly in Wales, qualifying as an instructor in the Royal Artillery Signals Training regiment. After his national service he returned to ECA from 1949 to 1953, where he was taught by William Gillies. The three talented young Scottish painters David Michie, David McClure and John Houston, although born in different years, as a result of the national service of the first and the war service of the second, all finished College in the same year and remained close friends afterwards. Awarded a travelling scholarship by the college in 1954, Michie went to Italy together with John Houston. They travelled to different parts of the country, but also stayed for a memorable period in the hill-top town of Anticoli Corrado.

Michie originally lectured at Gray's School of Art in Aberdeen. In 1961 he returned to Edinburgh to teach at ECA. From 1982 to 1990 he was Head of the Drawing and Painting School. He served as Vice Principal from 1974 to 1977 and was made a professor in 1988. He retired in 1990. In 1979 he was Visiting Artist at the University of the Arts in Belgrade. In 1991 he went to the University of California at Santa Barbara as visiting professor. In 1997 he was appointed an OBE, and in 2009 he received an Honorary Fellowship from ECA "in recognition of [his] outstanding contribution to the life of the College and the education of its students".

David Michie had many gallery and museum exhibitions, including the Royal Scottish Academy, the Lemon Street Gallery, and the Mercury Gallery. Numerous works by the artist have been sold at auction, notably Aeroplanes Passing By, sold at Christie's King Street in The Scottish Sale in 2007. Several articles about him have been published, including Art review: The Michie Family, The Scottish Gallery, Edinburgh. He is represented in many private as well as in numerous public collections, including those of Aberdeen Art Gallery, Glasgow Museums, The City of Edinburgh Museums, The University of Edinburgh, Tate Gallery, Art in Healthcare and Maggie's Centre, Edinburgh.

His work, often inspired by travel, was always colourful and light in touch. Even in the Fifties, when the painting of his close friends was often sombre, his own, though it could be dark in tone, was usually lightened in mood by flashes of bright colour. Later this same lightness of touch was often expressed in humorous observation of human behaviour. His interest lay, "not in grand historical paintings but in the beauty of the everyday observed at first hand, the view from his window, the racing pigeons shown by miners at a local Pigeon Fancying fair, a bunch of flowers in a jug". Some of his paintings reflect his travels in the US and Australia. Favourite subjects include birds, Nature, and people in the street. He worked both in oils and watercolour.

== Memberships ==
Royal Scottish Academy, Society of Scottish Artists, Fellow Royal Society of Arts, Founding Fellow Institute of Contemporary Scotland, Royal Glasgow Institute of the Fine Arts.
