= Grosvenor Thomas =

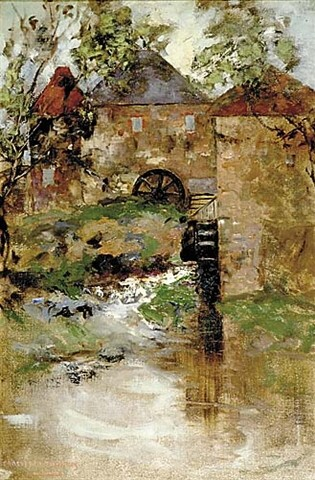
The Watermill

George Grosvenor Thomas (1856 - 1923) was an Australian-born Impressionist painter of Scottish ancestry; known primarily for landscapes and still-lifes.

== Life and work ==
Thomas was born in Sydney. In 1885, possibly because he thought he would find more opportunities in Europe, he left Australia for the United Kingdom and settled in Glasgow, around 1886. There, due to a long-standing interest in art, he became acquainted with several members of the Glasgow Boys, an artists' group that was influenced by the Barbizon School and credited with introducing Post-Impressionism to Scotland. This inspired him to become a serious artist. Despite his association with the group, he appears to have been largely self-taught.

He focused on rural landscapes, although he also created genre works and urban scenes, and he was equally at home in watercolors or oils. Much of his work shows the influence of Jean-Baptiste-Camille Corot and Charles-François Daubigny. He exhibited his works at the Royal Academy of Arts, Royal Scottish Academy and the Royal Scottish Society of Painters in Watercolour, which elected him a member in 1892. In addition, he held showings on the Continent, notably in Munich and Dresden, where he was awarded a gold medal.

He eventually moved to London, which served as a base for his extensive travelling, but maintained his contacts with the Glasgow Boys. He died there in 1923.
