= James Hillocks =

Scottish painter (born 1915)

- Born: James Hillocks; 28 January 1915; Buckie, Scotland
- Known for: Portraits, Landscapes
- Awards: Guthrie Award, 1947

James Hillocks (born 28 January 1915) was a Scottish painter. He won the Guthrie Award in 1947 with his work, the oil painting Portrait Of My Mother. He went to teach art in Ghana.

== Life ==
Hillocks was born on 28 January 1915 at 8 Cluny Terrace, Buckie. His father was Edward Hillocks (1870–1962) and his mother was Margaret Johnston (born c. 1872). His elder brother Edward Hillocks (1902–1962) was a motor engineer.

In 1949, he married Kathleen Kerr Moyes, known as Kay. They had a son, who was born in Buckie in January 1951.

The Hillocks had already moved to Ashimola in the Gold Coast, but Kay had returned to Scotland to have her baby.

On 4 May 1955, Kay had a daughter. This time she did not return to Scotland and the baby was born in Suntresu Hospital, Kumasi, Gold Coast.

== Art ==
Hillocks studied at Gray's School of Art in Aberdeen. He studied under Robert Sivell and was a contemporary of Alberto Morrocco and Taylor Bremner. With Morrrocco and Taylor he painted murals under Sivell's supervision, notably in Aberdeen University Union's exhibition hall.

James McClellan MacKendrick (1920-1988) had known Hillocks since 1945. Hillocks had followed the full course of 'Arts and Crafts' at Gray's School of Art and also obtained a teacher's certificate from the Education Department of Scotland.

Hillocks became an Art Teacher in Keith Grammar School.

While staying at 5 Cluny Terrace, Buckie, Hillocks entered two works into the Royal Scottish Academy exhibition of 1947. It was the first and only time he exhibited at the RSA. The works were: Portrait Of My Mother and The Schoolroom Window. He won the Guthrie Award with the portrait of his mother.

He received a Carnegie Trust grant which allowed him to travel Europe until September 1949.

His friend James MacKendrick became a supervisor of the School of Art in Kumasi College in Gold Coast (now Ghana) for the period 1952–62. W. E. Duncanson became Principal of the college from 1954 to 1961. A number of Scottish art appointments were made by the college:- Tom McCrorie MacNair, Conrad McKenna, G. W. Lennox Patterson; and the Glasgow School of Art became a clearing house for teachers. The external examiner of the period was Douglas Bliss, the Director of the Glasgow School of Art.

In 1950, Hillocks was another that went to the Gold Coast as he had got a job there as an Art Teacher at a Teacher Training College. The Gold Coast implemented a Scottish style of art training - from 1952 to 1962 this is known as 'the Scottish Period' in Ghana - and Hillocks was one of the teachers at College of Art of the Kwame Nkrumah University of Science and Technology (KNUST), Kumasi.

One of Hillock's students was Edmund Tetteh, better known as Professor E. J. K. Tetteh, a painter of Kumasi Realism. Tetteh said of Hillocks that he was a great colourist.

Another student Grace Kwami received realist and impressionistic techniques from James Hillocks. Hillocks introduced those techniques from 1952.

The Hillocks went back and forth from Scotland to the Gold Coast over the next few years. The Gold Coast became independent in 1957, becoming Ghana. It is known that James Hillock stayed there after Ghana's independence. For how long is not clear. The Hillocks took a ship to England from Ghana in December 1958. They were returning to the Schoolhouse in Portknockie in Banffshire. It is not known if they returned to Ghana as usual later.

== Works ==
The Schoolroom Window has been for auction.
