= George William Salvesen =

Scottish sculptor

- Born: George William Cochrane Salvesen; 1 September 1897; Helsinki, Finland
- Died: 30 May 1970 (aged 72); Haddington, Scotland
- Known for: Sculpture
- Awards: Guthrie Award, 1924

George William Salvesen (1 September 1897 – 30 May 1970) was a Scottish sculptor, born in Helsinki, Finland. He was a joint winner of the fifth annual Guthrie Award in 1924 with his work, the sculpture The Dance.

== Life ==
George William Salvesen was born in Helsinki in 1897. Finland at the time of his birth was a Grand Duchy but still part of the Russian Empire.

On 20 October 1911 his father George Adolph Stevenson Salvesen was given UK naturalisation, when George William Salvesen was 14. The naturalisation was approved by Winston Churchill, in his last days as Home Secretary before becoming First Lord of the Admiralty. The certificate [Certificate No. 21128] noted all of the children and it is assumed that they were all naturalised by the same process. The address given on the certificate was 21 Royal Circus, Edinburgh. This was the Salvesen's family home.

== Art ==
He was a student at the Edinburgh College of Art from 1916 to 1922. He won a commendation for his diploma in sculpture in 1921.

He was still at 21 Royal Circus, Edinburgh when he first exhibited work at the Royal Scottish Academy in 1921. Two pieces Inspiration in plaster; and Head of a Girl in bronze were seen.

Salvesen was elected to the Society of Scottish Artists in 1923.

In 1924, he had moved to 12 Belgrave Crescent Lane and exhibited The Hoop and The Dance with the RSA. It was The Dance that was named as the Guthrie Award winner. It was a joint award with that of the painter Donald Moodie.

In 1925 he exhibited The Pillar of Salt. This was illustrated in a periodical regarding the RSA.

He was at the Scottish War Memorial workers dinner in 1927; a dinner hosted by the Duke of Atholl, and invited by Sir Robert Lorimer and J. F. Matthew. This was for all the sculptors, artists and workmen who were engaged in erecting the War Memorial.

He was listed as a sculptor in the 1930–31 Post Office Directory for Edinburgh and Leith.

== Death ==
He died on 30 May 1970. His address was given as Whitelaws Garvald in Haddington.

== Salvesen and the Arts ==
George William Salvesen was part of the Salvesen family that came to own the Shipping and Logistics company in Edinburgh that was Christian Salvesen. The original Christian Salvesen that ran the company was George's great uncle; the brother of his paternal grandfather Carl Emil Salvesen.

George's involvement with sculpture meant that the Christian Salvesen company was a keen arts sponsor. In 1989 they sponsored a £8000 sponsorship with the RSA in a new RSA Salvesen scholarship.
