= Laelia Armine Cockburn =

Scottish painter (1894–1969)

- Born: 23 March 1894; Glencairn, Dumfries and Galloway, Scotland
- Died: 16 November 1969 (aged 75); Hawick, Scotland
- Education: Lucy Kemp-Welch
- Known for: Watercolours, especially of animals
- Relatives: Henry Cockburn, Lord Cockburn, great grandfather
- Awards: Guthrie Award, 1925
- Elected: Royal Scottish Society of Painters in Watercolour

Laelia Armine Cockburn (23 March 1894 – 16 November 1969) was a Scottish painter, born in Glencairn, Dumfries and Galloway. She won the Guthrie Award in 1925 with her work A Rough Lot For Sale.

== Life ==
Laelia Armine Cockburn was born in Glencairn, Dumfries and Galloway. Her parents were John Cockburn (18 October 1858 - 22 November 1928) and Isabel Mary Dew (3 April 1864 - 21 July 1952). Laelia was one of their four children. She was the Great granddaughter of Henry Cockburn, Lord Cockburn and on 26 April 1954 attended the opening of a commemorative plaque in Edinburgh commissioned by the Saltire Society.

While growing up at North Berwick, she played golf at the North Berwick Ladies Club.

== Art ==
She studied at the Lucy Kemp-Welch School at Bushey.

She was elected to the Royal Scottish Society of Painters in Watercolour in 1924.

She won the Guthrie Award in 1925 with her work A Rough Lot For Sale at the Royal Scottish Academy open exhibition in that year.

The 1925 Royal Glasgow Institute of the Fine Arts exhibition in the McLellan Galleries saw Cockburn exhibit Baby Blue Hare which was soon after sold.

At the 1929 RSW exhibition at the McLellan Galleries in Glasgow, Cockburn entered her work, the Aberdeen Press and Journal headlining 'Women shine at fine exhibition'. The Scotsman newspaper commented on Cockburn's fine watercolours of animals:

Miss Laelia A. Cockburn paints horses not only with knowledge and observation, but also with a sympathy which makes them remarkably eloquent and expressive and gives them a definite individuality. The same quality of sympathy is to be seen in her sketch of a couple of dogs, entitled Contemplative, in the second room.

It was reported by the Dundee Evening Telegraph that her work In the Shed had been sold.

In the 1940 Society of Scottish Artists exhibition in Edinburgh, Cockburn exhibited The Foal.

She exhibited three works at the 1943 RSW exhibition at the RSA Galleries in Edinburgh:- Pads, of a sporting dog; Little Friend, another dog study; and The Rubbing Post.

In the Scottish Society of Woman Artists exhibition of 1960, Cockburn exhibited a seascape Rising Tide.

== Death ==
She died on 16 November 1969, in the St. Andrews Convent care home, in Hawick.

== Works ==
She normally signed her work 'LAC'.
