= Kate Campbell Muirhead =

Scottish sculptor (1893–1980)

- Born: 9 April 1893; Perth, Scotland
- Died: 20 July 1980 (aged 87); Dumfries, Scotland
- Known for: Sculpture
- Awards: Guthrie Award, 1920 (joint winner)

Kate Campbell Muirhead (9 April 1893 – 20 July 1980) was a Scottish sculptor, born in Perth. She won the first Guthrie Award in 1920 with her work, the portrait bust Elizabeth. As Muirhead got older she moved into painting rather than sculpture.

== Life ==
Kate Campbell Muirhead was born in Perth to parents George Muirhead (8 May 1861 - 28 December 1945) and Elizabeth Campbell Farquharson (17 February 1861 - 8 November 1948). They had married on 30 June 1892 in Perth. Her father was a painter and decorator for J. Muirhead and Sons. The 'J. Muirhead' was George's grandfather John Muirhead (born 1803).

Kate went to school, she was admitted to Sharp's Institution, Perth on 20 November 1899. There she was encouraged in Art by the Art Master Mr. Smeaton. After school she went to the Edinburgh College of Art.

In Edinburgh she stayed at Shandwick Place. On 24 April 1924 she married George Stalker Nicoll (12 October 1892 - 13 May 1953). He was a medical student at the university. They had two sons Alasdair and Angus.

Before the Second World War, the family moved to Exeter in Devon. George died in 1953, and Kate then moved back to Scotland, staying in Gatehouse of Fleet, first with her son at Low Barlay, then at East Neilson, then to her last home at Bogside.

== Art ==
Importantly, she received a travel scholarship with the Edinburgh College of Art in 1915 (which allowed her to study in London, sketch monuments, and develop her sculptural style). With the First World War ongoing and ruling out travel to continental Europe, Muirhead went to London. She went round the city sketching tombs and monuments; reportedly this helped her sculpture develop.

She worked with James Pittendrigh Macgillivray in his Edinburgh studio from 1914 to 1924.

Muirhead exhibited at the Royal Scottish Academy 6 times:- in 1914 (1 work), 1919 (2 works), 1920 (3 works) - when she won the first Guthrie Award - 1921 (1 work), 1923 (3 works) and 1924 (2 works).

She exhibited at the Royal Glasgow Institute of the Fine Arts 3 times between 1919 and 1923.

The bust with which she won the Guthrie Award in 1920 was a portrait of Elizabeth Murray Usher. Elizabeth became a Laird of Gatehouse of Fleet when she inherited 40,000 acres on her father's death in 1924. Muirhead's son Angus later became a farm manager at Low Barlay, Gatehouse before he got a Government post in Northern Rhodesia.

Her Guthrie Award win when she was around 27, the first win of the award, was a joint win with David Macbeth Sutherland. The award rules later solidified so that only under 35s could win the award. Sutherland with his early win is the only over 35 year old to win the award, as he was around 37 when he won the award.

On moving to England, her art career lulled; but when she returned to Scotland she began exhibiting again. As she got older she moved away from sculpture and into painting. She exhibited at the RSA in 1960.

Her son Angus stayed in Zambia; and Muirhead went there to see him. While there she painted natives at work in the fields.

Muirhead exhibited her work locally at the Dumfries and Galloway Fine Arts Society at Gracefield Art Gallery; and at the Harbour Cottage Gallery in Kirkcudbright.

== Death ==
Muirhead died on the 20 July 1980. She died in Dumfries and Galloway Royal Infirmary.

Her memorial service was on 28 October 1980 at Bogside, Planetree Park, Gatehouse of Fleet.

== Works ==
There is a bronze bust of Elizabeth Murray Usher in the Murray Arms hotel in Gatehouse of Fleet.

The Victoria and Albert Museum has photographs of three of her busts.

The Stewartry Museum has a painting Still Life With Cactus.

A self-portrait painting is in the Gracefield Arts Collection in Dumfries.
