= William Oliphant Hutchison =

Scottish portrait and landscape painter

Sir William Oliphant Hutchison

Director of the Glasgow School of Art
- In office 1933 – 1943
- Preceded by: James Gray
- Succeeded by: Allan Walton

Personal details
- Born: 2 July 1899
- Died: 5 February 1970 (aged 70)
- Education: Glasgow School of Art
- Occupation: Artist, educationalist

1926 Self-portrait

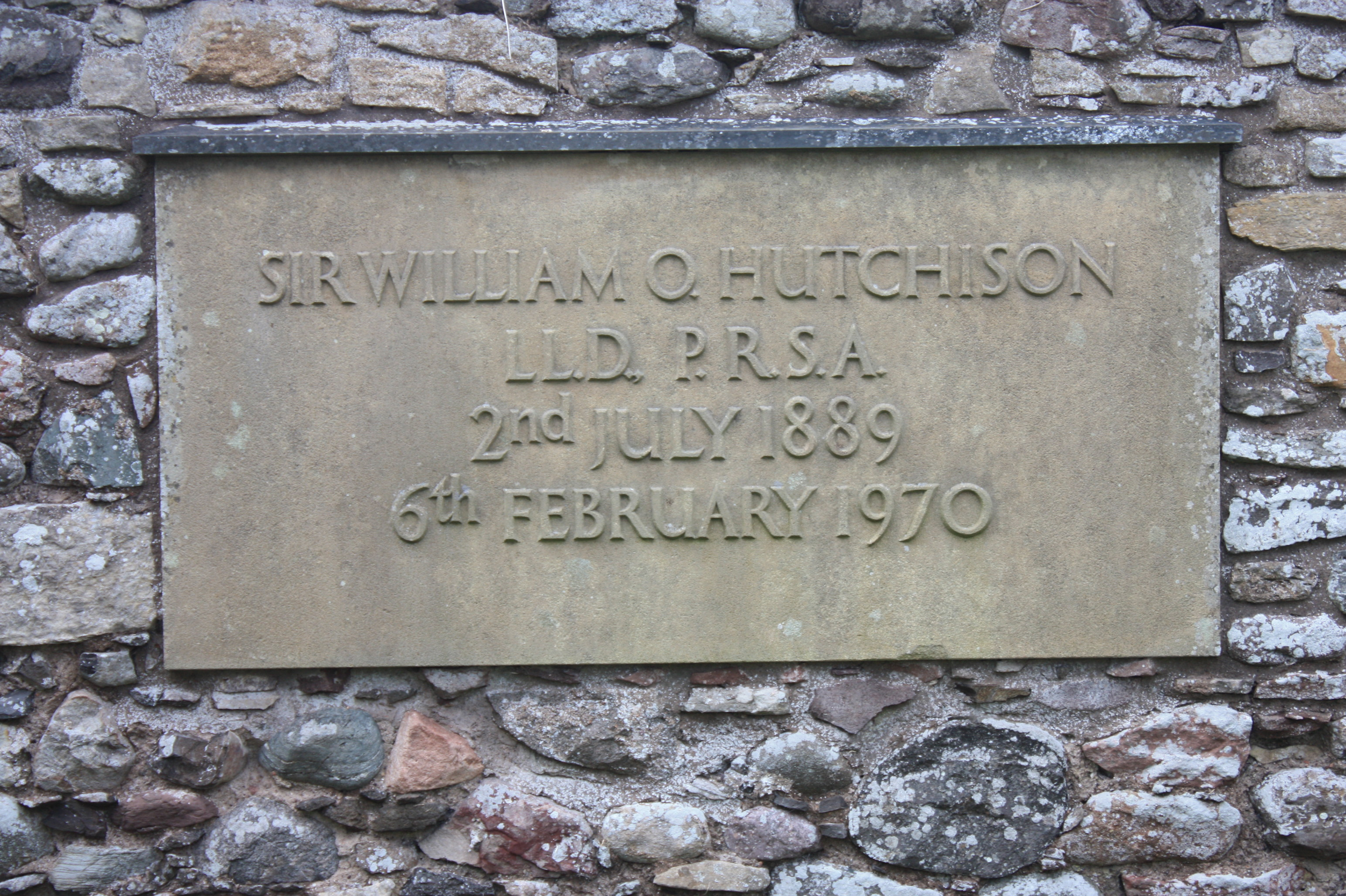
The grave of William Oliphant Hutchison, Collessie, Fife

Sir William Oliphant Hutchison LLD PRSA (2 July 1889 – 5 February 1970) was a Scottish portrait and landscape painter. He was an Honorary Member of the Royal Academy, President of the Royal Scottish Academy and a member of the Royal Society of Arts.

== Life ==
Born in Kirkcaldy, Hutchison was a scholar at Kirkcaldy High School, and subsequently at Rugby School. He attended the Edinburgh College of Art between 1909 and 1912. On leaving he started the Edinburgh Group, holding exhibitions for three consecutive years, with Eric Robertson, Alick Riddell Sturrock, John Guthrie Spence Smith, Dorothy Johnstone, Mary Newbery, and David Macbeth Sutherland who later became Principal at Gray's School of Art in Aberdeen. Hutchison also worked and studied in Paris for a while, mainly painting portraits though also producing landscape and figure paintings.

Hutchison enlisted during the First World War serving with the Royal Garrison Artillery and being stationed in Malta, later being badly wounded in France. After demobilization in 1918, he and his wife occupied a studio flat in Edinburgh until 1921, before moving to London. Here he successfully worked as a portrait painter, exhibiting at the Royal Academy, becoming a member of the Savage Club, and enjoying a large circle of friends, mainly from the art world.

Hutchison was Director of the Glasgow School of Art from 1933 to 1943, from all accounts being an excellent director. Though a great traditionalist he encouraged those who tended to the avant-garde. The school maintained an interest in those staff and students serving during World War II, sending them gifts and cards.

In 1955 Hutchison was commissioned to paint Prince Philip, Duke of Edinburgh for the Royal College of Surgeons of Edinburgh.

On leaving the Glasgow School of Art, Hutchison carried on with portraiture both in Edinburgh and London. A large exhibition of his work was held in London in 1964.

Hutchison served on numerous art-related bodies—he was a Committee member of The Edinburgh College of Art, the Board of Management of the Royal Scottish Academy, Director of The Glasgow School of Art, an Associate of The Royal Scottish Academy, President of The Glasgow Art Club, and Vice-president of The Scottish Modern Arts Association.

He served as President of the Royal Scottish Academy from 1950 to 1959 and was knighted in 1953.

He died on 5 February 1970 at his home at 30 Oakwood Court, Kensington, London.

He is buried in Collessie churchyard in central Fife in Scotland, just east of the church.

== Personal life ==
He married Edward Arthur Walton's youngest daughter Margery in 1918. They raised two sons, Henry Peter (1919), and Robert Edward (1922), and a daughter (1935).

Hutchison was the son of Henry William Hutchison, of Kinloch, a Kirkcaldy business man, and Sarah Hannah Key, who raised a family of four sons and two daughters.
