= Robert Henderson Blyth =

Scottish artist (1919–1970)

- Born: 21 May 1919; Newlands, Glasgow, Scotland
- Died: 18 May 1970 (aged 50); Aberdeen, Scotland
- Education: Glasgow School of Art
- Known for: Painting
- Awards: Guthrie Award, 1945

Robert Henderson Blyth RSW RSA (21 May 1919 – 18 May 1970) was a Scottish landscape painter and artist.

== Life and work ==
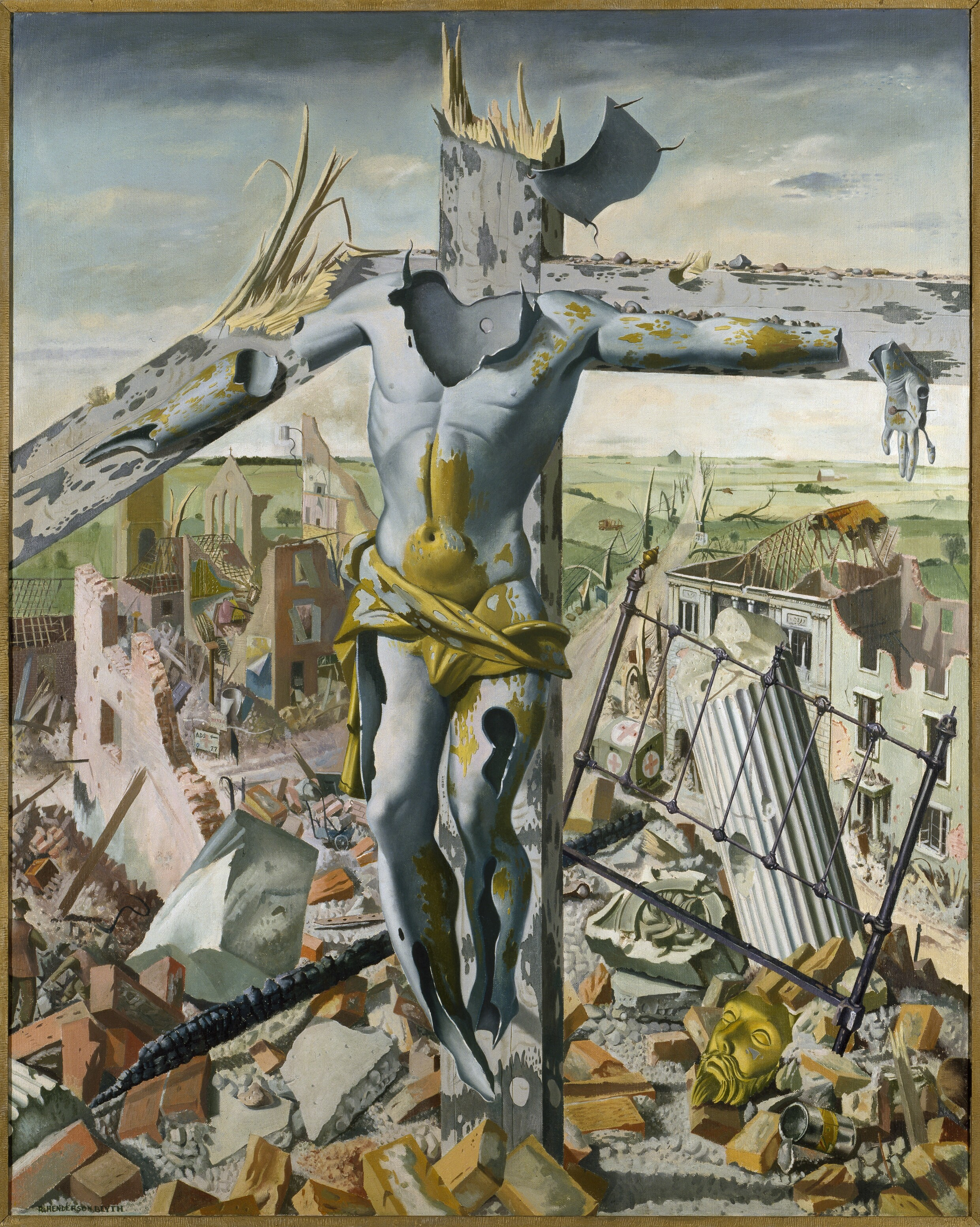
In the Image of Man (1947), (Art.IWM ART16010)

Blyth was born in the Newlands area of Glasgow and studied at the Glasgow School of Art from 1934 to 1939.

Blyth joined the Royal Army Medical Corps in 1941 and served with them until the end of the Second World War. During the war Blyth continued to paint and sketch, whilst on active service in France, Belgium, the Netherlands and Germany. Four paintings from this period were acquired by the War Artists' Advisory Committee. Towards the end of the conflict Blyth's unit, 157 Ambulance, was based in Hamburg much of which had been devastated by RAF bombing raids in 1943. Blyth used the background of a destroyed city in his most famous painting, In the Image of Man. Painted after the war ended the painting's title parodies the Judeo-Christian concept of man made in the image of God and shows a city in ruins behind a bomb damaged crucifix.

In 1945 Blyth won the Guthrie Award from the Royal Scottish Academy. In 1946 he painted Existence Precarious, a self-portrait as a soldier in a trench, which is now in the National Gallery of Scotland. Also in 1946 he began teaching at the Edinburgh School of Art and became an artist in residence at Hospitalfield House.

In 1954 he moved to Aberdeen to take a post at Gray's School of Art, where he became head of drawing in 1960, a post he maintained until his death in 1970.

The Scottish Arts Council organised a memorial exhibition to Blyth which toured Scotland during 1972.

== Memberships ==
- Associate Royal Scottish Academy, 1949
- Member Society of Scottish Artists, 1949
- Member Royal Scottish Society of Painters in Watercolour, 1949,
- Member Royal Scottish Academy, 1958.
