= Colin Gibson (artist) =

Scottish painter (1907–1998)

- Born: Colin Hutcheon Gibson; 5 November 1907; Arbroath, Scotland
- Died: 7 April 1998 (aged 90); Arbroath, Scotland
- Known for: Nature and landscape painting
- Awards: Guthrie Award, 1943

Colin Gibson (5 November 1907 – 7 April 1998) was a Scottish painter, born in Arbroath, Scotland. He won the Guthrie Award in 1943 with his work, the painting Lisbeth. Lisbeth was the name of his wife. He was also a noted journalist, writing largely about nature and also his local Angus area.

== Life ==
Colin Gibson was born in 1907. His parents were Colin Gibson, a missionary, and Euphemia Sophia Axworthy (1879 - 8 February 1954). They had married in 1903 in Arbroath. They had two sons Colin, and his elder brother William Axworthy Gibson (1904 - 1979).

He was Art medallist at Arbroath High School. While still at High School he wrote nature notes for the Arbroath Guide and drew football cartoons for the Arbroath Herald.

He worked in journalism, writing for the People's Friend and wrote nature diaries in the Dundee Courier.

Gibson loved nature and visited the island of Rona, near Skye in 1933–34 to study the flora and fauna.

He married Elizabeth Jarvis Lawrence (1911 - 1990) on 6 July 1938, known as Lisbeth.

== Art ==
He went to Gray's School of Art and studied there from 1925 to 1929. He won two travelling scholarships at the School and went to Italy then Spain. His paintings of Venice are considered noteworthy.

Gibson first exhibited at the Royal Scottish Academy when he was staying at Lynash in Arbroath. In 1935 he submitted two works:- The Mountain Blaaven, Skye; and the Premlinary Sketch For Panel In The Rowett Agricultural Research Institute, Aberdeen.

He moved to Monifieth and in 1941 he submitted two works to the RSA:- Arbilot Mill; and Dalbrack, Glenesk, In Spring. In 1942 that increased to five works:- Lisbeth; Pensive Girl; Girl Seated With Hand Poised; Still Life; and My Love Is Young!.

In 1943 he submitted six works to RSA:- another portrait Lisbeth; L'Allegra; Itinerant; Girl, Seated Reading A Book; Artist At Work; Figure Studies - Red Chalk. This paid off with the RSA giving him the joint Guthrie Award alongside Alberto Morrocco.

Six works was his high point, but he continued exhibiting work at the RSA. His last year to do so was in 1948:- Young Model; Women Disrobing; and Woman In White.

In 1969 the Earl of Strathmore asked Gibson to paint the then Prince Charles' favourite fishing spot on the River Dee. The work is now part of the Royal Collection.

== Death ==
He died on 7 April 1998 in Arbroath. He is buried in the Western Cemetery in Arbroath.

In 2017, the colour sketches that Gibson did from the isle of Rona were turned into island stamps; his sketches of Dry Harbour, Church Cave and the cliffs seen in rough weather from Dry Harbour were all turned into local issue stamps.

== Works ==
Dundee's Barrack Street museum hosted a retrospective exhibition of his work in 1988.

Gibson's work should not be confused with that of the Belfast painter Colin Gibson, notable for paintings of Northern Ireland.
