= Ian Campbell (artist, born 1902) =

Scottish painter

- Born: 22 October 1902; Oban, Scotland
- Died: 13 January 1984 (aged 81); Dollar, Scotland
- Known for: Particularly portraits and etchings
- Awards: Guthrie Award, 1931

Ian Campbell (22 October 1902 – 13 January 1984) was a Scottish painter, born in Oban, Scotland. He won the Guthrie Award in 1931 with his work, the painting Self Portrait.

== Life ==
Ian Campbell was born in Oban in 1902. His parents were John Campbell (born 30 November 1865) of Oban Mansions, a well known solicitor in the town, and one of the founders of An Comunn Gàidhealach. His mother was Jane Sutherland Forbes. They married in 1891.

One of his sisters was married to the Town Clerk Depute J. W. N. Black.

He went to Oban High School before moving on to the Glasgow School of Art.

After leaving the Art School, he was an Art Teacher at the schools in Glasgow.

He married Noreen Kathleen Bull in 1935.

He became the Art Master at Dollar Academy. He taught there from 1937 to 1968 when he retired.

== Art ==
He studied at Glasgow School of Art from 1921 to 1926 under Maurice Greiffenhagen. At Glasgow School of Art he won the Haldane Scholarship.

He won the Guthrie Award for his oil painting Self Portrait in 1931.

For the 38th Annual exhibition of the Society of Scottish Artists at Edinburgh in 1931, Campbell submitted a portrait of Miss Margaret Wright.

At the 71st exhibition of the Royal Glasgow Institute of the Fine Arts in 1932 at the McLellan Galleries in Glasgow, Campbell submitted a self portrait.

At the Royal Academy exhibition in London in 1932, Cameron submitted a portrait of Mrs De Klee. He also exhibited a work in the 1927 Royal Academy exhibition.

At the 50th exhibition of the Royal Institute of Oil Painters in 1934 in London, Wallace submitted a portrait of a female head. This was described by the Glasgow Herald newspaper:

There stands out a female head from the brush of Ian Campbell, the Glasgow artist. The modern tones are rallied in this latter work, and while it is, therefore in comparison with the others, a brightly cheerful picture, there is nothing that is 'ultra' in it, and as a study of a beautiful young girl it exemplifies the delightful effect possible by the use of lighter colours, firmly but delicately laid on.

On moving to Dollar he still kept exhibiting his work. At the Royal Scottish Academy he submitted works:- in 1939, Jean Kemp and Neil Foggie Esq.; in 1940, Miss Stan Leslie and The Cycle Of The Hours a sketch composition; in 1943 another sketch Autumn; in 1944 The Wind and an etching Nativity.

In 1959 he exhibited Catriona Campbell at the Royal Scottish Academy.

He submitted his portrait Miss Pat Hamnett to the 78th Paisley Art Exhibition in 1962.

In 1966 he exhibited two works at the Royal Scottish Academy Catriona In A Red Jacket and Majorca 1965.

In 1968 he exhibited Lorne Campbell at the Royal Scottish Academy.

In 1970 he exhibited two works at the Royal Scottish Academy Canon Stretch and Dr. William Galloway.

== Death ==
He died suddenly at his home in East Burnside, Dollar on 13 January 1984. He was 81.

== Works ==
His portrait of Harry Bell is in the Dollar Museum. His painting Westward is in the Smith Art Galleries in Stirling.

Cameron's work should not be confused with the later Glasgow artist, also Ian Campbell; or the Edinburgh artist Ian Stuart Campbell.
