= Adam Bruce Thomson =

Scottish painter

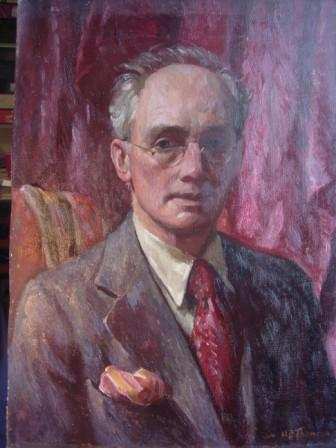
- Adam Bruce Thomson – self portrait painted c1950
- Born: Adam Bruce Thomson; 22 February 1885; Edinburgh, Scotland
- Died: 4 December 1976 (aged 91); Edinburgh, Scotland
- Education: Edinburgh College of Art
- Known for: Painting, Art education

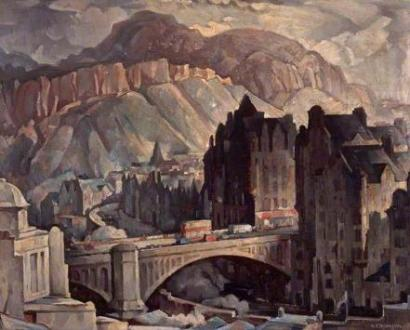
North Bridge and Salisbury Crags, from the North West 1930s (Oil painting) "Edinburgh City Art Centre".

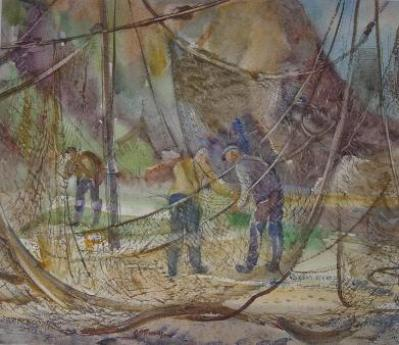
Fishing nets – Stornoway 1940s (Water colour painting)

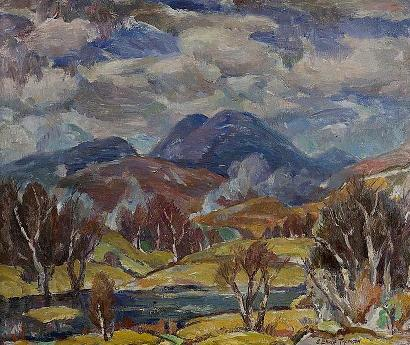
Mountains in the Scottish Borders 1950s (Oil painting)

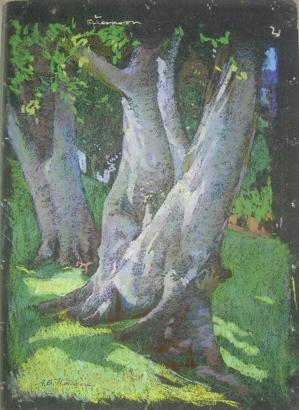
Light through the Trees 1940s (Pastel)

Adam Bruce Thomson OBE, RSA, PRSW (22 February 1885 – 4 December 1976) or ‘Adam B’ as he was often called at Edinburgh College of Art, was a Scottish painter perhaps best known for his oil and water colour landscape paintings, particularly of the Highlands and Edinburgh. He is regarded as one of the Edinburgh School of artists.

== Biography ==
Thomson was born in Edinburgh and studied at the Royal Institution School of Art and the RSA Life School. He went on to study at the Edinburgh College of Art between 1908 and 1909, where he gained technical expertise in etching, drypoint and lithography and in the difficult media of pastels and watercolours. Thomson's early years at the Edinburgh College of Art, had all the rigours of life classes, study of the antique and copying the Old Masters. Thomson graduated with Diplomas in Drawing and Painting, and Architecture before travelling to Spain, Holland, Paris on various scholarships during 1910. One of his earliest surviving oils, from 1910, depicts St. Martin’s Bridge in Toledo, Spain. In 1912 Thomson took up employment at the Edinburgh College of Art.

During World War I Thomson served in the Royal Engineers as a Second Lieutenant. Following the Battle of Arras he produced some poignant works on-the-spot and was able to record troops moving near Arras by the shattered façade of the Abbey of Mont St Eloi. Other works, including Reconstructing the Bridge, Montignies were exhibited at the RSA in 1921 and, more recently, at the Scottish Gallery in Edinburgh and at the Scottish National Portrait Gallery. Also displayed was a finely detailed pen and pencil drawing of Zeppelin L 33 which crashed at New Hall Farm, Little Wigborough on the night of 23 September 1916.

On 15 April 1918 Thomson married Jessie I. Hislop, the sister of his great friend and fellow Edinburgh artist Walter Balmer Hislop and they set up home in Marchmont. The couple had three children born between 1919 and 1924. In 1919 Thomson resumed his staff position at the Edinburgh College of Art and would remain there until 1950. During this career Thomson taught etching, composition, still life to the painting school and colour theory to the art and architecture students. Regular visitors to the Thomson family home included his student and protégé William Wilson and also William Crozier. Other close colleagues from the Edinburgh College of Art and the Royal Scottish Academy included Stanley Cursiter and David Macbeth Sutherland. In the 1920s in particular Thomson's work was at its closest to that of Samuel Peploe, Francis Cadell and other contemporaries, notably John Guthrie Spence Smith and Penelope Beaton.

Thomson's oil paintings share some of the characteristics of his colleagues at the College in particular Sir William George Gillies and Sir William MacTaggart. The early 1930s saw his series of monumental paintings of his home town including North Bridge and Salisbury Crags, from the North West, now in the Edinburgh City Art Centre, and The Old Dean Bridge exhibited at the RSA in 1932. Throughout his life, Thomson painted extensively using watercolours and oils in and around Edinburgh, the Berwickshire coast, South West of Scotland on the Solway, the Scottish Borders and Abbeys (Kelso Abbey, Melrose Abbey, Dryburgh Abbey), Lismore, Benderloch, Mull, Stornoway, Iona, Ross and Cromarty, Plockton and elsewhere. The archives of the National Library of Scotland hold some 24 of his sketchbooks, spanning around 40 years of work.

He was awarded the OBE in 1963 and become president of both the Royal Scottish Society of Painters in Watercolour and the Society of Scottish Artists. His work has been exhibited recently in November 2013 Edinburgh, 'Painting the Century', at an exhibition of some of his pastels ('Adam Bruce Thomson - The Pastels'), in October 2015, and in April 2017 at an exhibition of some of his watercolours (Adam Bruce Thomson 'Untroubled Certainty'), all at the Scottish Gallery, Dundas Street, Edinburgh. A major retrospective of Adam Bruce Thomson’s work entitled 'Adam Bruce Thomson - The Quiet Path' curated by Dr Helen E. Scott was on display at the City Art Centre (Market Street, Edinburgh) from Sat 11 May to Sun 6 Oct 2024.

== Awards and honours ==
- 1936–37 President of the Society of Scottish Artists (SSA)
- 1937 Elected Associate Royal Scottish Academy (RSA)
- 1946 Elected to the Royal Scottish Academy (RSA)
- 1947 Elected to the Royal Scottish Society of Painters in Watercolour
- 1949–56 Treasurer of the RSA
- 1956–63 President of the Royal Scottish Society of Painters in Watercolour (PRSW)
- 1963 Awarded Order of the British Empire
- 1971 Awarded first May Marshall Brown Memorial Award of the Royal Society of Painters in Watercolour
- 1971 Became Honorary Retired Member of the Royal Scottish Academy
- 1976 Awarded the William J. Macaulay Memorial Award of the Royal Scottish Academy
