= William Drummond Bone =

Scottish painter

- Born: 20 November 1907; Ayr, Scotland
- Died: 16 November 1979 (aged 71); Ayr, Scotland
- Known for: Landscapes, seascapes, oils, watercolours
- Relatives: Muirhead Bone, first cousin once removed
- Awards: Guthrie Award, 1939
- Elected: Royal Scottish Academy, Associate 1969

William Drummond Bone (20 November 1907 – 16 November 1979) was a Scottish painter, born in Ayr. He won the Guthrie Award in 1939 with his work, the oil painting Leisure.

== Life ==
William Drummond Bone was born in 1907 at 19 Fort Street, Ayr. His father was James Bone (c. 1880 - 16 July 1953), a saddler, his mother Mary Bennett (born c. 1882). They had married on 15 June 1904.

Muirhead Bone, another Scottish artist, is related to William Drummond Bone. William Drummond Bone's paternal grandfather was William Bone (6 March 1841 - 20 March 1917). This William Bone's brother was David Drummond Bone (c. 1841 - 24 October 1911). David Drummond Bone's son was Muirhead Bone. William Drummond Bone's father James Bone (c. 1880 - 16 July 1953) and Muirhead Bone (23 March 1876 – 21 October 1953) were cousins; Muirhead Bone and William Drummond Bone were first cousins once removed.

William Drummond Bone married Helen Docherty in 1933.

They had a son James Drummond Bone in 1934, known as Drummond. His engagement to Vivian C. Kindon was announced in 1969.

== Art ==
Bone went to Glasgow School of Art in 1928 and studied there till 1931. He won a travelling scholarship and went to continental Europe.

Bone exhibited Auld Brig, Ayr at the Royal Scottish Academy in 1930. His home was 66 St. Leonard's road in Ayr.

In 1931 he exhibited at the RSA, his home now being 27 Eglinton Terrace in Ayr. The work exhibited was Old Quarries Near Aberdeen.

Bone taught at the School between 1935 and 1972.

In 1939 he won the Guthrie Award with Leisure. Described by the Glasgow Herald:

This large canvas, with a group of figures in strong lighting and rich colour, is a considerable achievement, and is certain to arouse great interest.

From 1946 he moved to a new address The Cottage, 7 Southpark Road, Ayr. With the exception of 1953 he exhibited every year at the RSA to his death. In 1946 he exhibited Camp In Luneberg, in 1979 he exhibited A Cotswold Landscape, Spring In The Park, Ayr and Ayrshire Landscape.

== Death ==
Bone died on 16 November 1979 in Heathfield Hospital, Ayr.

Bone still had works lined up for the 1980 Royal Scottish Academy exhibition on his death. This was his last RSA exhibit and the works Knaresborough; The Boat Vessel, Ayr; Self Portrait c.1930; Rain on Arran; and Flowers were shown.

== Works ==
Bone is best known for his wartime watercolours.

Stiegal Fine Arts ran a retrospective exhibition of his work in 1980.

The Glasgow School of Art hold a self portrait.

Bone's Near Dalrymple, Ayrshire, Ayrshire Landscape, Ayr Shore, The Burns Monument, The Pleasure Beach and Cairn O' The Mount is held by South Ayrshire Council at Rozelle House Galleries.

Bone's Portpatrick is held by Kirkcudbright Galleries.

Glasgow Museums Resource Centre hold The Demolition Of Ayr Jail.

Dundee Art Galleries and Museums Collection hold A Breezy Day By The Sea, Cornish Coast and Seaside.

Inverness Art Gallery and Museum hold The New Housecoat.

Newport Museum and Art Gallery hold On The Road To Poolewe.
