= James Wallace Ferguson =

Scottish painter

- Born: 25 May 1884; Stirling, Scotland
- Died: 26 August 1970 (aged 86); Irwell, New Zealand
- Education: Royal Scottish Academy
- Known for: Oils, Watercolours, Pastels
- Awards: Guthrie Award, 1923
- Elected: Glasgow Art Club President 1949-51

James Wallace Ferguson (25 May 1884 – 26 August 1970) was a Scottish painter, born in Stirling, and resident in Glasgow for most of his life. He went to the Glasgow School of Art before the First World War. He won the Guthrie Award in 1923 for young artists of the Royal Scottish Academy. He became the President of the Glasgow Art Club in the 1950s. He also was a Principal Lecturer in Art at Jordanhill Teacher Training College. He died in New Zealand while staying with his son.

== Life ==
James Wallace Ferguson was born in Stirling to Adam Ferguson and Elizabeth Kennedy. He went to Craigs School in Stirling before going to the Glasgow School of Art. He studied art at the Glasgow School of Art from 1913 to 1915, and later taught evening classes at the school.

Ferguson married Hannah Drummond (1901 - 21 April 1964), known as Nan, in 1925 at Blythswood in Glasgow. Nan worked at Elderpark Primary School in Glasgow. Their son James Drummond Ferguson, known as Gus, (21 July 1927 - 16 October 2022) was born in Hillhead, Glasgow. He later emigrated to New Zealand.

Ferguson lectured in art at the Jordanhill Teacher Training College.

== Art ==
Ferguson painted landscape and portraits, particularly of Stirling and Glasgow interest. His art is usually signed 'James W. Ferguson'.

Ferguson won the Guthrie Award in 1923 for his art. The annual Guthrie Award of the Royal Scottish Academy was for notable young Scottish artists, and it noted that the artist now had a professional status.

In amongst works of Edward Atkinson Hornel, the Glasgow Art Club exhibited in the McLellan Galleries at Sauchiehall Street in 1925, Ferguson's The Year's Awakening.

The Glasgow Society of Painters and Sculptors Exhibition of 1927 saw Ferguson exhibit The Pianist which the Glasgow Herald of 14 June 1927 called 'a forceful piece of work'.

In 1930 he was exhibiting as part of the Glasgow Art Club in their Bath Street Gallery. His pieces The Lunch Hour and Winter Sunshine were noted by the Dundee Courier newspaper of Saturday 8 March 1930.

Ferguson was exhibiting still as part of the Glasgow Art Club at Bath Street in their Oil Painting exhibition of 1931. The Scotsman newspaper singled out Ferguson's painting of St Monans church tower. In 1932 in a similar exhibition The Scotsman newspaper of Saturday 27 February 1932 notes, his Home from the Sea is noting fishing boats returning to Scotland's east coast.

Ferguson regularly exhibited pieces at the Smith Art Gallery in Stirling. The Scotsman of Saturday 2 February 1935, noting that his exhibit At Home was of: a figure in a cosy corner of environment, [and] has an arresting quality. His work was again picked out by The Scotsman newspaper when reviewing the Glasgow Art Club exhibition of February 1935 at Bath Street: That same year, in 1935, he was commissioned by Stirling Council to execute a mural of Stirling Castle.

In January 1937, the Glasgow Art Club were exhibiting in the McLellan Galleries and Ferguson exhibited his Sleeping Children. It was the first time that the Art Club had used the Sauchiehall Street venue since 1929.

The Scotsman, while praising the Smith Art Gallery in Stirling, noting at that time it had the largest exhibition space in Scotland, on 8 February 1938 that: James W. Ferguson shows an interesting Portrait in Brown at the institute.

In November 1938, his Cheerful Housewife was noted in a Watercolour and Pastel exhibition, which ran to 7 January 1939, by the Glasgow Art Club at Bath Street.

Ferguson became the vice-president of the Glasgow Art Club in 1948–49, and then was President of the club in 1949-50 and 1950–51.

In 1951 at the Paisley Art Institute, Ferguson exhibited in the Watercolour exhibition his study of silver birches named Dancing Trees, noted by the Paisley Daily Express of Thursday 22 February 1951.

At the Royal Glasgow Institute of the Fine Arts exhibition in McLellan Galleries in December 1952, it was noted that his exhibit Moonlight was sold privately after the exhibition.

Some of his works are in the Smith Art Gallery and Museum in Stirling.

== Death ==
Ferguson died on 26 August 1970 in Irwell, at the residence of his son. His funeral was held at Christchurch in New Zealand on 28 August 1970.
