= Ann Henderson (sculptor) =

Scottish sculptor

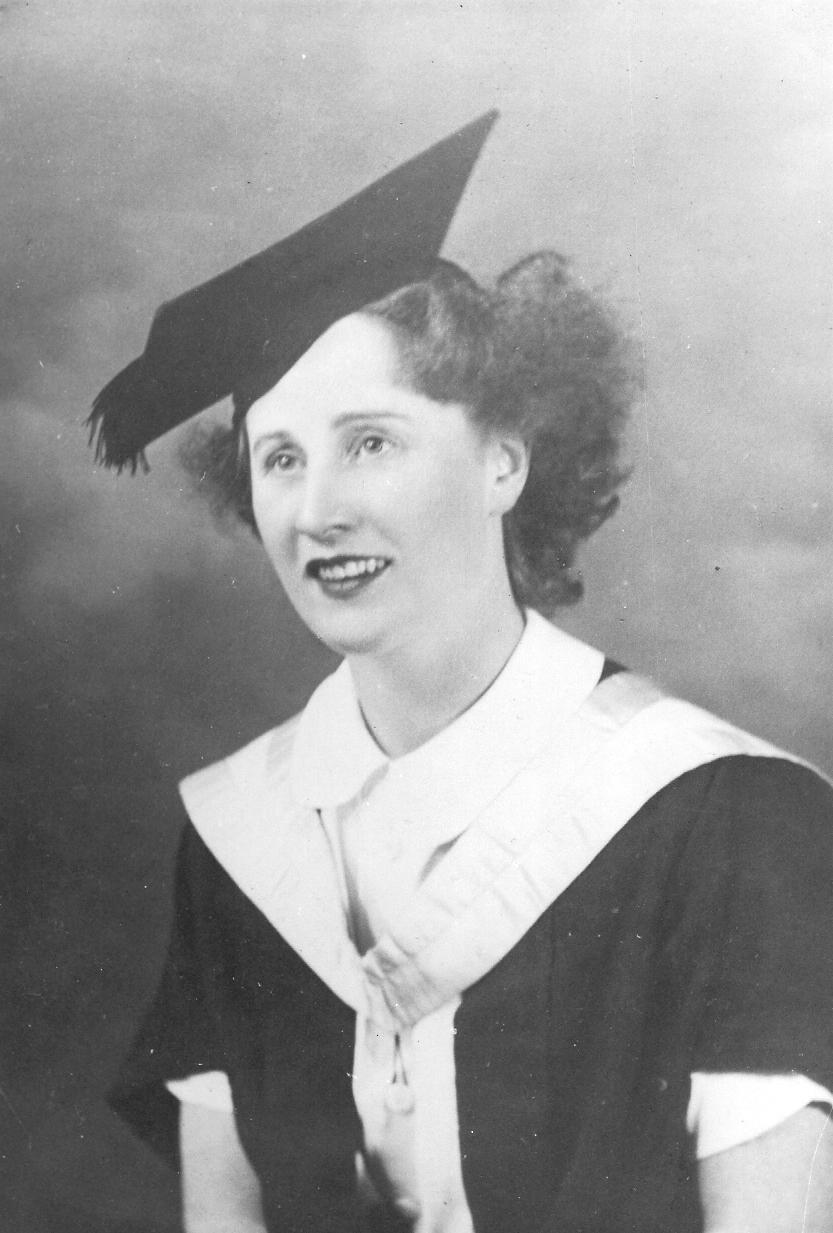
- Ann Henderson (c.1945)
- Born: Ann Henderson; 11 October 1921; Ormlie, Thurso
- Died: 13 March 1976 (aged 54)
- Education: Edinburgh College of Art; École des Beaux-Arts
- Known for: Sculpture
- Awards: Guthrie Award, 1954

Ann Henderson RSA (11 October 1921 – 13 March 1976) was a Scottish sculptor born in Thurso, Caithness, Scotland. Henderson taught sculpture at the Edinburgh College of Art for almost twenty years and was elected a member of the Royal Scottish Academy in 1973.

== Biography ==
Ann Henderson was born into a farming family at Ormlie, near Thurso. While a pupil at the Miller Academy, her art teacher recognised and encouraged her creative flair and was influential in persuading Ann’s parents to allow her to study sculpture.

In 1940 Henderson became a student at the Sculpture School of the Edinburgh College of Art, graduating in 1945 (the only woman in her year). For achieving high results in her Diploma of Sculpture she was awarded a Post-graduate scholarship. This enabled her to embark on further studies in the Sculpture School and as a result, she was awarded a major travel scholarship that took her to Paris. There she studied under the French sculptor Marcel Gimond at the École des Beaux-Arts. In 1941 her family had moved to a farm at Culrain in Easter Ross and it was to this property that Henderson returned as a student during her college holidays.

Before embarking on her scholarship travels, Henderson worked for a year as a Junior Assistant Teacher in the Sculpture School, returning to this position after her travel year. She was later promoted to Lecturer and subsequently to Senior Lecturer. Henderson introduced new experimental teaching courses to the Sculpture School. Henderson’s sculptures would often begin life in her studio as clay maquettes. She embraced new materials and was one of the first sculptors in Scotland to use polyester resin and fiberglass in any significant way. Her sculptures ranged from the figurative to the abstract as the influences of realism gave way to that of cubism and abstraction. Picasso’s cubist approach and joy in combining materials are reflected in her large plaster and bark sculpture ‘Hen Wife’ constructed in the forest.

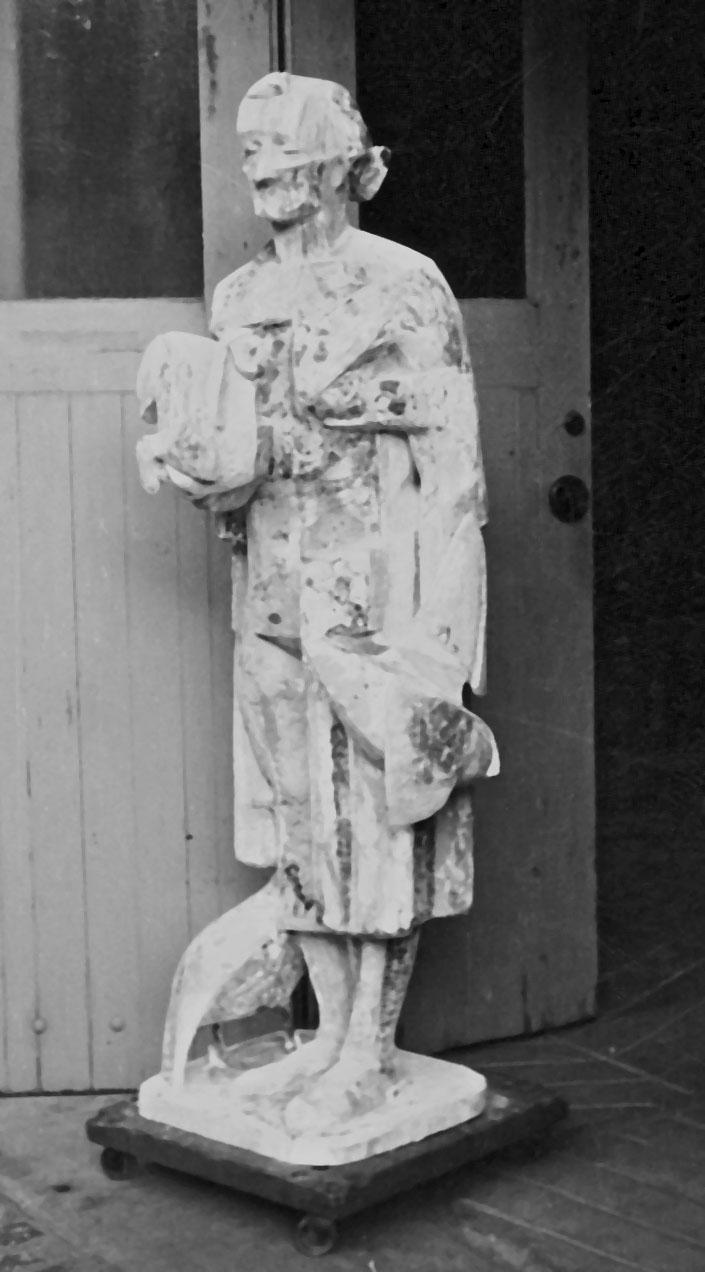
"Hen Wife"

Her later development towards a smooth uncomplicated form is illustrated in an untitled figure (see the image, right). She said of her work simply that she liked to reflect the life around her.

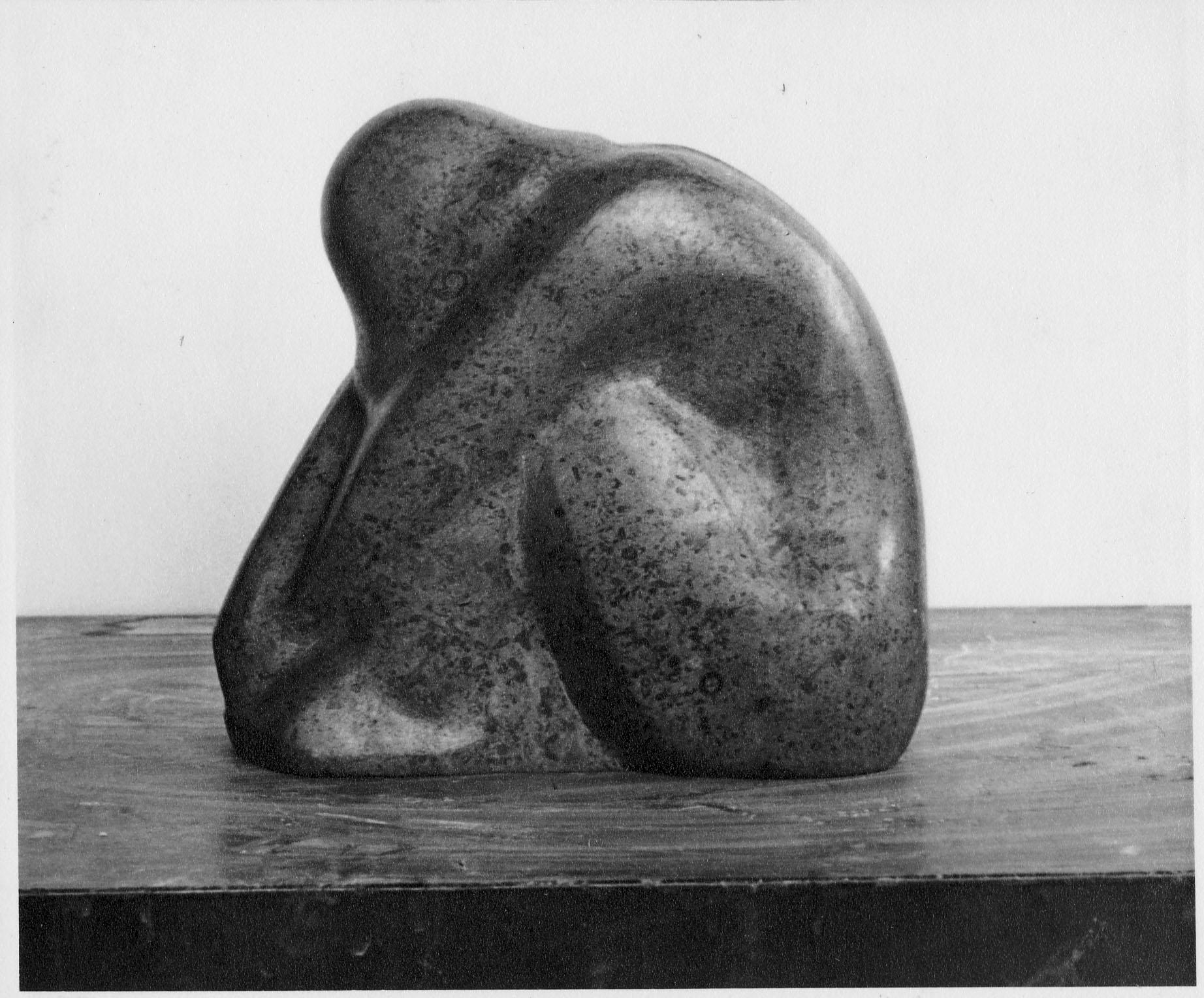
"Untitled Figure"

Henderson’s sculptures have been exhibited in many of the important galleries in the United Kingdom including the annual exhibitions of the Society of Scottish Artists, the Royal Scottish Academy, the Royal Academy, London, and in Paris.

Her academic successes included three RSA Annual Exhibition awards: The Keith Prize given for the best work by a student; the Ottilie Helen Wallace Prize for best work by a woman artist and the coveted Guthrie Award for the most outstanding work by a young Scottish artist. The Guthrie Award money enabled Ann to study in Greece for three months. Later she would become a member of the Scottish Arts Council’s ‘young artists’ awards panel.

In 1969 Henderson was instrumental in mounting an International Open Air Exhibition of Sculpture in Dunfermline, believed to be one of the first of its kind in Scotland. This was a venue she returned to in 1972 when she organised a second open-air exhibition. Henderson was also responsible for an imaginative scheme while convener for the RSA commemorative Exhibition In 1976. She died before the exhibition took place but her ideas were realised through her associates on the committee.

While Henderson’s studio in Edinburgh was central to her creative practice she also spent time at her Highland croft. There, she and her business partner would breed and show Highland ponies which won prizes at agricultural shows including the Royal Highland Show. While on the croft she worked on her sculptures in a makeshift studio space. Before her death, she completed the reconstruction of a superb studio but sadly illness was to rob her of the opportunity to use it. Ann died on 14 April 1976 in her 55th year.

Bill Scott her friend and colleague wrote of Ann after her death in the RSA Annual Report 1976: “We have lost a sculptor of maturity, energy, and influence, an artist whose reticent authority and breadth of vision were above question...”

== Studies and Teaching Career ==
- 1940-1945 Diploma of Sculpture, Edinburgh College of Art
- 1945-1946 Post-graduate Scholarship ‘Highly Commended’. Studied under the direction of Eric Schilsky, Head of School, Edinburgh College of Art
- 1946-1947 Junior Assistant Teacher (part-time), School of Sculpture, Edinburgh College of Art
- 1947-1948 Travel Scholarship – École des Beaux-Arts, Paris
- 1948-1950 Junior Assistant Teacher (part-time), School of Sculpture, Edinburgh College of Art
- 1950-1963 Junior Assistant Teacher (full-time), School of Sculpture, Edinburgh College of Art
- 1963-1964 Lecturer, School of Sculpture, Edinburgh College of Art
- 1964 Senior Lecturer, School of Sculpture, Edinburgh College of Art

== Awards ==
- 1945 Post-Graduate Scholarship ‘(Diploma of Sculpture’ assessment)
- 1946 Major Travel Scholarship (‘Highly Commended’ post-graduate assessment)
- 1952 RSA Keith prize (best student work in RSA Annual Exhibition)
- 1954 RSA Guthrie Award ‘Composition’ bronze (best work by a Young Scottish artist in RSA Annual Exhibition)
- 1962 Ottilie Helen Wallace prize (best work by a woman artist in RSA Annual Exhibition)

== Exhibitions ==
Henderson exhibited regularly with the SSA and the RSA and later with the Royal Academy of Arts in London.

- 1954 Royal Scottish Academy Exhibition, Edinburgh
- 1957 Arts Council Festival Exhibition, Edinburgh
- 1959 The 1957 Gallery, Edinburgh
- 1964 Royal Scottish Academy Exhibition, Edinburgh
- 1964 Four Scottish Artists, The Arts Council Gallery, 11 Rothesay Terrace, Edinburgh 3
- 1969 Open Air Exhibition of Sculpture, Pittencrieff Park, Dunfermline.
- 1972 Open Air Exhibition of Sculpture, Pittencrieff Park, Dunfermline.
- 1974 Eight Edinburgh Sculptors, Music Pavilion, Pittencrieff Park, Dunfermline, Scotland

== Permanent Collection ==
‘Venus and Chair’ (bronze) Scottish National Gallery, Edinburgh, Scotland

== Memberships ==
- Member of the Scottish Arts Council panel responsible for awards for young artists.
- 1955 Professional Member, Society of Scottish Artists
- 1968 Associate, Royal Scottish Academy
- 1973 Member, Royal Scottish Academy

== Public Commissions ==
- 1956 ‘Education’ (carved granite (abstract)), Thurso High School, Thurso, Caithness, Scotland. Henderson donated her time, the Caithness Education committee covered the cost of the granite stone. Architect Sir Basil Spence, Glover and Ferguson.
- 1958 ‘Agriculture’ (coloured concrete relief) on gable of School of Agriculture, University of Edinburgh, Liberton, Edinburgh, Scotland. Architect: Reiach and Cowan ()
- 1962 ‘Sculpture Light Fitting’ (chromium and Steel Plate). British European Airways Corporation, Princes Street, Edinburgh, Scotland. Architect Law and Dunbar-Nasmith
- 1964 ‘Music’ (bronze) Music Pavilion, George Watson School, Edinburgh. Architect Michael Laird
- November 1971 ‘Man with Sheep’ (carved stone) Market Square, Galashiels, Scotland. Mr. C Scott of Gala and the Scottish Arts Council ()
- 1963 - 1964 ‘They knew him in the Breaking of Bread’ (carved stone) Refractory, Nunraw Monastery, Haddington, Scotland
