= Thomas Whalen (sculptor) =

Scottish sculptor

- Born: Thomas Thomson Alexander Whalen; 16 October 1903; Leith, Scotland
- Died: 19 February 1975 (aged 71); Edinburgh, Scotland
- Known for: Sculpture
- Awards: Guthrie Award, 1933

Thomas Whalen (16 October 1903 – 19 February 1975) was a Scottish sculptor. He won the Guthrie Award in 1933.

== Life ==
Thomas Whalen was born in Leith on 1903. His father was James Whelan (c.1879–1951) and his mother was Mary Alexander (born c. 1879). They married on 24 November 1899 in Leith.

In 1930 he was living at 18 Bangor Road in Leith. In 1932 he was at 7 Eyre Terrace. In that year on 23 September he married Margaret Falconer (born 1907). They had a son and daughter.

== Works ==
He exhibited Madonna and Child and Speed in the 1930 Royal Scottish Academy exhibition. In 1931 he exhibited St. Christopher and Diana at the RSA. In 1932 he exhibited Cradle of Humanity, Europa and Nativity and Entombment at the RSA. He won the Guthrie Award in 1933 exhibiting The Amazon. He also exhibited Mother's Kisses and Torso that year.

Whalen sculpted five Art Deco panels for Philip McManus's facade for the National Bank of Scotland headquarters building on George Street, Edinburgh (1937). His figurative sculpture Service featured in the entrance hall of the Scotland (South) pavilion of the 1938 Empire Exhibition in Glasgow. In the late 1930s he designed the bas relief panel Knowledge, depicting a boy being borne aloft in front of a tree, for Kilsyth Academy in Stirlingshire.

He designed the gilded relief sculpture on the facade of William Kininmonth's Brunton Theatre in Musselburgh (1971). The sculpture Bird is believed to be Whalen's last work.

== Death ==
He died 'peacefully' at the Royal Infimary in Edinburgh on 19 February 1975. His funeral was on 24 February 1975.

Colleagues of the Royal Scottish Academy were there for the funeral.

The obituary in The Scotsman newspaper of Friday 21 February 1975 stated:

OBITUARY Mr. Tom Whalen, sculptor. Mr. Tom Whalen, the noted Scottish sculptor, much of whose work can be seen on churches and public buildings, has died in hospital in Edinburgh. Mr. Whalen, born in Leith in 1903, was working as a ship's carpenter when he began his art career by studying at the Edinburgh College of Art, where he was granted a fellowship. He came first to the public notice in the early 1930s when his burnished bronze, Speed had a place in the Royal Scottish Academy Exhibition. In 1932 he won an RSA travelling scholarship and he visited Rome and Florence. The following year he received the Guthrie Award. He was elected RSA in 1954. One of his most recent public commissions was the sunburst on the Brunton Hall at Musselburgh, and during the 1973 Edinburgh Festival a retrospective exhibition of 50 of his works was presented by the Saltire Society. He is survived by his wife, Margaret, and a son and daughter.
