= David Shanks Ewart =

UK artist (1901–1965)

- Born: 21 December 1901; Glasgow, Scotland
- Died: 12 October 1965 (aged 63); Glasgow, Scotland
- Known for: Portraits
- Awards: Guthrie Award, 1926

David Shanks Ewart (21 December 1901 – 12 October 1965) was a Scottish painter, born in Glasgow. He went to the Glasgow School of Art just after the First World War. He won the Guthrie Award in 1926 with his work The Toilers.

== Life ==
David Shanks Ewart was born in Glasgow at 117 Henderson Street, North Woodside, Glasgow. His parents were James Ewart (18 April 1866 – 2 December 1949) and Agnes Waddell Shanks (10 July 1861 – 4 August 1932).

He married Gwendolyn Robertson (30 September 1900 – 1984) on 8 August 1928 at Hartwood in North Lanarkshire. They had 3 children; two daughters and one son.

During the Second World War he was a Volunteer Reserve in the Royal Navy from 1941.

== Art ==
He went to the Glasgow School of Art from 1919, graduating in 1924. He won a travelling scholarship in 1924 and travelled to France and Italy.

At the 1926 Royal Scottish Academy exhibition, his work The Toilers won the 1926 Guthrie Award.

The Glasgow Art Club Spring exhibition saw Ewart exhibit The Night Watchman

He exhibited with the Royal Glasgow Institute of the Fine Arts in 1927. His works Loch Coruisk and The Return were noted in The Scotsman, stating that they suffered as a sequel to his The Emigrants.

He taught at the Glasgow School of Art for a brief period.

He was accepted as an Associate member of the RSA in 1934.

In the Paisley Art Institute exhibit of January–February 1939, Ewart provided a portrait of a young girl Eve Sylvia.

In the Royal Glasgow Institute of the Fine Arts exhibit of October 1939 in the Kelvingrove Art Gallery, Ewart entered a portrait of James Muir D. Sc.

Primarily a portrait painter, from 1946 he travelled annually to the United States to paint wealthy American industrialists for six months of every year.

== Death ==
He died on 12 October 1965, in Glasgow in a nursing home.

== Works ==
His work These Shall Our Hearts Remember is in Hull Museum at the Ferens Art Gallery.

He created portraits of dignitaries like Sir John Stewart, Lord Provost of Glasgow and Admiral of the Fleet Sir Dudley Pound.

A self-portrait is in the National Galleries of Scotland.

There are works by a Ewart in Morocco in 1939, but there is no evidence to suggest that David Shanks Ewart went to Morocco at that time. These works are also stylistically different from David Shanks Ewart's work.
