= Alister Maitland =

Scottish painter (1910–1995)

- Born: 22 April 1910; Govan, Scotland
- Died: 10 August 1995 (aged 85); Huntsville, Ontario, Canada
- Known for: Known for painting fishing villages and harbours
- Awards: Guthrie Award, 1932

Alister Maitland (22 April 1910 – 10 August 1995) was a Scottish painter, born in Govan, Scotland. He won the Guthrie Award in 1932 with his work, the painting Alice Ann. Alice Ann was the name of Maitland's mother.

== Life ==
Alister Maitland was born in Govan in 1910, before the village was annexed by Glasgow in 1912. His parents were James Maitland (c. 1870 - 1933) and Alice Ann Kimmins (13 March 1869 - 25 August 1960). They had married on 17 December 1891 in Govan. They had 3 sons Alister and James Alfred and Alfred Horatio; and 1 daughter Elizabeth Jessie (1 October 1894 - 17 May 1989). Elizabeth was the eldest and at the time she was born the family stayed at 83 Queen Street in Govan. Alfred Horatio was born in 1906 in Edinburgh; James Alfred was born in 1899 in Ardrossan, but unfortunately died not long after birth, the death record showing a zero age.

They then stayed at 13 Stephen Drive in Linthouse, where Alister was born.

In 1934 Alister was staying in 13 Kennedar Drive in Govan with his mother.

The family moved to Canada, not long after the death of James Maitland.

His mother Alice Ann Kimmins was born in Wadsworth in England; she died in Mount Albert, Ontario. His sister Elizabeth Jessie died in London, Ontario; his brother Alfred Horatio died in Bermuda in November 1985.

== Art ==
Alister was still staying in Stephen Drive when he exhibited his first piece at the Royal Scottish Academy. This was February Morning in 1931.

By 1932, he was staying at Kennedar Drive and his work Alice Ann won the Guthrie Award. He was 21 at the time of entry to the exhibition, but by the time of the announcement had turned 22.

The Aberdeen Press and Journal of 28 May 1932 said this of the Guthrie Award win:

GUTHRIE AWARD. The Committee of Arrangements the Royal Scottish Academy, after careful examination of the works shown at exhibition of the Academy by young Scottish artists, decided to grant the Guthrie Award to Mr Alister Maitland, Glasgow, for his picture 'Alice Ann.' The subject of this picture, by the youngest artist to gain this award - his age being only twenty-one - is an old woman seated in front a curtained window. A little girl with a toy balloon is in the background, and there are other bright balloons and draperies, which a feeling of gaiety to the work. Broad in handling and in a high key of clean colour, it is full of promise.

The old women and the title of the piece is Alice Ann, Alister's mother. She would have been 63 around the time of Alister's Guthrie Award. The young child is most probably Alister's youngest niece Cecilia. His sister Elizabeth Jessie had already married an Alexander Wood (25 October 1887 - 19 January 1963) on 25 October 1919 and had two daughters; the youngest of which was Cecilia Keltie Wood (27 December 1924 - 11 June 2000), around 7 years old at the time of the Guthrie Award in 1932.

In 1933 he exhibited the work Rocks Near Rosehearty at the Royal Scottish Academy.

== Death ==
He died on 10 August 1995 in Huntsville, Ontario, Canada.

== Works ==
The Dictionary of Scottish painters states that Maitland was known for painting fishing villages and harbours. It is not known if he continued painting in Canada. His work, Farm Near Renfrew, Winter is known.
