= Alexander George Oliphant =

Scottish painter

- Born: 2 May 1911; Grangemouth, Scotland
- Died: 18 November 1971 (aged 60); London, England
- Known for: portraits
- Awards: Guthrie Award, 1936

Alexander George Oliphant (2 May 1911 – 18 November 1971) was a Scottish painter, born in Grangemouth, Scotland. He won the Guthrie Award in 1936 with his work, the oil painting David Kerr Esq. In his later life he switched to illustrating comic books, working on the Eagle comic.

== Life ==
Alexander George Oliphant was born in 1911 in Grangemouth. His father was Bill Oliphant (5 January 1880 - 14 June 1951), his mother Ethel Maude Chipperfield (8 July 1890 - c. October 1967). Alexander was one of their two children; the other was William Oliphant (17 January 1916 - 25 October 1989).

He married Thora Clee (1911 - 21 February 1968) in April 1947. Thora was from King's Norton in Worcestershire previously married to William L. Goldsmith.

From at least 1945 he was in London staying at 30 Bedford Chambers, Piazza. In 1948 he moved to 9 Graham Terrace in Westminster, then in 1949 moved to 23 St. George's Court, Brompton Road, South Kensington. He had a studio at 4 Cavaye Studios, Cavaye Place, Kensington. He moved to 55 Crompton Court, South Kensington in 1962.

At Thora's death she stayed at Flat 4, 130 Queens Gate, Kensington.

== Art ==
Oliphant went to Glasgow School of Art when still employed in a commercial house in Glasgow. He stayed with his parents in Grangemouth and the Falkirk Herald reported that the commute to Glasgow, his studies and his work left him little time to paint. He won the Chalmers-Jervise Prize of 1934 at the Royal Scottish Academy exhibition, with an address of 27 Marshall Street in Grangemouth. The work was a Portrait Of My Grandfather and Oliphant won £6 for the prize. The subject was likely his paternal grandfather Alexander Oliphant (c.1850 - 13 February 1940) from Grangemouth, rather than his maternal grandfather George Chipperfield from London.

With a prize with his first work exhibited at the RSA, his second work exhibited at the RSA was David Kerr Esq. It was called a character study, full of humour and vitality. It won the 1936 Guthrie Award. This painting was of another relation, his father's cousin David Kerr. David Kerr was a well known lecturer in astronomy and geology in Edinburgh.

The Falkirk Herald on reporting the Guthrie Award win described the circumstances of Oliphant's limited time constraints:

WORK DONE AT HOME. He has not the fortune to be the possessor of a studio, and all his work is done at home, where he takes the members of his family as subjects. To complete his picture Mr Oliphant had to dash from his work last Tuesday to Edinburgh, and on arriving at the Academy he had only three-quarters of an hour in which varnish his contribution. A day or two later received a letter from the Academy Committee, In which it was stated that he had won the Guthrie Award, that a commemoration tablet had been attached his picture and that the award would dispatched to him in the autumn.

Oliphant moved to illustrate comic books. He worked on the first issue of the Eagle comic in the story Plot Against the World. He worked on the Eagle annual and the Daily Mirror Book for Boys.

He illustrated Richard Armstrong's boy's novel Sea Change, when it was serialised for the comic Ranger; and also the series 'Sink the Scharnhorst!' in the same publication.

== Death ==
He died on 18 November 1979 in Brompton Hospital, London.
