= Margaret Cross Primrose Findlay =

British artist (1902–1968)

- Born: 1902; Glenlivet, Banffshire
- Died: 1968 (aged 65–66); Bearsden, Dunbartonshire
- Education: Glasgow School of Art
- Known for: Sculpture
- Awards: Guthrie Award, 1928 (joint winner)

Margaret Cross Primrose Findlay (1902–1968) was a Scottish sculptor and modeller. She won the Guthrie Award in 1928 for her work The Bathers; a joint winner with William Crozier.

== Biography ==
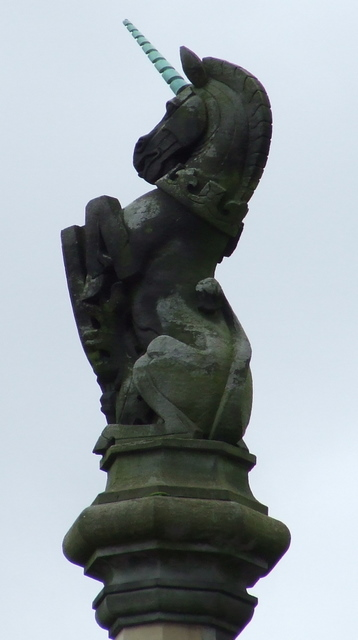
Unicorn on top of Glasgow's Mercat Cross, modelled by Findlay

Findlay was born at Glenlivet in Banffshire and trained at the Glasgow School of Art under Archibald Dawson between 1920 and 1925. After graduation she taught at the Beacon School at Bridge of Allan and then at Hillhead High School in Glasgow.

Findlay was the modeller for the Mercat cross in Glasgow, carving the wooden animals. The Mercat Cross is considered a significant artistic triumph for Scottish women, as Findlay worked on it with Edith Burnet Hughes, the first practising female architect in Scotland.

From the mid 1920s to the mid 1930s, Findlay created several works including "Cobler (1927), The Bathers (1928), Gossip (1928), Head of a Baby (1930), Dancers (1931), King of the Castle (1931), Shy (1934) and Morning Song (1935)". For the 1938 Glasgow Empire Exhibition she created a frieze of figures.

== Exhibitions and awards ==
Findlay's work was exhibited at the Royal Glasgow Institute of the Fine Arts and the Royal Scottish Academy in Edinburgh. In December 1928, Findlay was awarded the Guthrie Award by the Royal Scottish Academy.
