= Claire Harrigan =

Scottish artist (born 1964)

Claire Harrigan (born 1964) is a Scottish artist.

Born in Kilmarnock, Ayrshire, she studied at Glasgow School of Art, graduating with a BA (Hons) Fine Art (Drawing and Painting), in 1986, at which time she received the Mary Armour Award for Still Life Painting. Since Art School she has worked as a full-time painter and travelled widely for inspiration, particularly in the West Indies, France, Portugal and Italy. In 1989, she was elected Professional Member SAAC. In 1992 (and subsequent editions) was listed in "Who's Who in Art" (published by Art Trade Press Ltd), and in 1990, in "20th Century Painters and Sculptors" by Frances Spalding.

In 1992 she was elected a member of The Royal Scottish Society of Painters in Watercolour (RSW).

== List of awards ==
- 1990 – Lily Macdougall Award, SAAC
- 1992 – James Torrance Memorial Award, RGI
- 1996 – Latimer Award, RSA
- 2002 – Artists Discovery Commission Award, Club Med
- 2004 – Glasgow Arts Club Fellowship Award, RSW Selected Exhibitions:

== Solo exhibitions ==
- Open Eye Gallery, Edinburgh
- Gatehouse Gallery, Glasgow
- Flying Colours Gallery, London
- Bruton Street Gallery, London
- Christopher Hull Gallery, London
- Macaulay Gallery, Stenton

== List of public collections ==
- Adam and Company
- The Fleming Collection
- Bank of Scotland
- Heriot-Watt University
- South Ayrshire Council
- Wigtownshire Educational Trust
- Club Med

== See also ==
- The Artist Magazine September 2006 "Masterclass : Bold Design in Mixed Media – Claire Harrigan.
- Abstract Techniques And Colour in Painting – Claire Harrigan & Robin Capon Published August 2007
