= Tako Taal =

- Born: Wales
- Education: Gray's School of Art
- Website: https://www.takotaal.com/

Tako Taal is a Welsh-Gambian artist, filmmaker and programmer based in Glasgow, Scotland. Her work looks at the social and psychic impact of colonialism. Her work has been reviewed in Art Monthly, the Scotsman, and Studio International.

== Early life and education ==
Tako Taal was born in Wales in 1989 with her family originating from Jufureh, in the Gambia. She attended Gray's School of Art in Aberdeen, studying contemporary art practice, and graduated in 2015.

== Practice ==
Taal's films look at multiplicities of identity, and explore the social and historical significance of her father's home, Jufureh, and myth-making about returning to places that no longer exist except in "topographies of grief and loss".

== Career ==
Taal was a committee member at the Market Gallery in Glasgow from 2016 to 2018. In 2018–2020, she was Artist in Residence at the Talbot Rice Gallery in Edinburgh, and in 2019, was RAW Academy fellow at RAW Material Company in Dakar.

Having not visited for 11 years, she travelled to the Gambia in 2016, and filmed at the Gambia Tourism and Hospitality Institute. This footage was incorporated into 2017's You Know it but it Don’t Know You.

Taal and fellow artist Adam Benmakhlouf programmed Give Birth to Me Tomorrow, the 2021 artists' moving image festival by LUX Scotland, held at the Tramway, in Glasgow. Originally planned to be a weekend event, but in response to the continued difficulties of the COVID-19 pandemic in the UK, it took place on several weekends throughout 2021, in a programme aligned with the lunar calendar.

At the shore, everything touches (2021) explored Taal's relationship with her father's home village, as well as the history of the area with relation to the Atlantic slave trade. (It is close to Kunta Kinteh Island (formerly known as James Island), a European (and later British) colonial fort.) Art Monthly described the work as establishing Taal "as among the most important multidisciplinary artists working today." Halo Nevus (2021), also explores her relationship with her paternal home country through the use of her birthmark as central character; following its slow fade over a period of five years. Her 2021 short film Departures features music inspired by a poem written by her late father and read by her uncles. The film's images focus on the surface of her naming blanket, which was given to her when she was born.

Taal was an associate artist at the 2021 Edinburgh Art Festival, commissioning six new pieces from other artists which would engage with the themes of Isaac Julien's 2019 film Lessons of the Hour. Pieces included work from Scotland-based artists Chizu Anucha, Sequoia Barnes, Thulani Rachia, and Matthew Arthur Williams. She also completed her residency at the Studio Pavilion in Glasgow, where she has been creating work for her first institutional solo show, launching at Dundee Contemporary Arts late 2021.

== Selected exhibitions ==
- 2017 – Compound, Intermedia Gallery, Centre for Contemporary Arts, Glasgow
- 2018 – Inherited Premises, Grand Union, Birmingham
- 2019 – A Spoon is the Safest Vessel, Glasgow Women's Library
- 2020 – Survey II, Jerwood Arts
- 2021 – At the shore, everything touches, Dundee Contemporary Arts
- 2022 — Meet me at the threshold, Talbot Rice Gallery
