= Sinclair Thomson =

Scottish painter

- Born: Robert Sinclair Thomson; 25 December 1915; Glasgow, Scotland
- Died: 24 July 1983 (aged 67); Ballantrae, Scotland
- Known for: Painting, pottery
- Awards: Guthrie Award, 1948
- Elected: Royal Scottish Academy, Associate 1952

Sinclair Thomson (25 December 1915 – 24 July 1983) was a Scottish painter, born in Glasgow, Scotland. He won the Guthrie Award in 1948 with his oil painting The White Shawl.

== Life ==
Sinclair Thomson was born in 1915 in Govanhill, Glasgow.

His father was Donald Thomson (20 December 1878 - 25 July 1952) and his mother was Diana Sinclair Sutherland (2 May 1879 - 3 July 1947). They married in Lanark in 1904. They had four sons, including Sinclair; and one daughter Diana who did not survive infancy.

Thomson went to school at Allan Glen's School then at Townhead in the city of Glasgow. While there he suffered a football injury, injuring his knee, which led to the amputation of his leg at the age of 16.

During the Second World War he became a dispatch rider for the Civil Defence, as he remained able to ride a motorbike. This triggered a lifelong love of motorbikes.

He became a teacher in the High School of Glasgow; and soon started teaching evening classes in pottery at the Glasgow School of Art.

Thomson married Florence Mary Aitken Jamieson (17 November 1925 - 9 December 2019) in 1946. They had one daughter, Rebecca Lynn Thomson b. 17 April 1959. Florence was also a painter. They divorced in 1962.

He married again in 1966. This was to Barbara Joan Ellen Carter (11 July 1923 - 19 March 2017), who like Thomson had been previously married. Barbara was previously one of Thomson's pottery students.

The couple bought a summer home, Tig Cottage in Heronsford near Ballantrae; and for many years spent the winters in Glasgow and the summers in Ayrshire.

== Art ==
He joined Glasgow School of Art in 1941. He studied painting under Hugh Adam Crawford.

From 1947 he regularly exhibited at the Royal Scottish Academy. He only exhibited paintings at the RSA. In only his second year exhibiting, in 1948 he won the Guthrie Award. His other paintings that year were Winter Landscape and Self Portrait.

He was elected Associate member of the Royal Scottish Academy in 1952.

He built a kiln at his home to continue his pottery and soon a number of students from his evening classes were attending his home for additional art classes.

He created large pottery murals for Lanarkshire schools.

In 1960 he got a permanent role at Glasgow School of Art becoming a lecturer in drawing and painting. He retired in 1975.

== Death ==
He died in the summer of 1983 at Tig Cottage. . He was chatting to his wife Barbara and suddenly died.

== Works ==
The Glasgow School of Art has a substantial collection of his work in their Art, Design and Architecture Collection.

The Ruth Borchard Collection has Self Portrait With A Sun Hat.

Paisley Museum and Art Galleries have Wester Ross and Flower Study

The Royal Scottish Academy has Tig Cottage And The Smiddy, Heronsford, Ballantrae.

Low Parks Museum has Haystacks At Toward.

His pottery usually has the marks ST and a Celtic Cross.
