= Guthrie Award =

Scottish art award

- Awarded for: Outstanding work by artists under 35
- Sponsored by: Royal Scottish Academy
- Date: 1920; 106 years ago
- Country: Scotland
- First award: 1920
- Current Winner: Daniel Nelis

The Guthrie Award is awarded annually with few exceptions to at most two recipients by the Royal Scottish Academy and is one of the most prestigious art awards in Scotland. It is named after the artist James Guthrie.

== Foundation of award ==
The award was founded in 1920. It was to commemorate the presidency of the Royal Scottish Academy by James Guthrie. It is awarded for the most outstanding work adjudged in the Royal Scottish Academy exhibition of the year to artists under the age of 35 (although the joint winner of the first award David Macbeth Sutherland was around 37 in 1920).

== Scottish-based ==
It is usual for the award to go to a painting and its artist, but occasionally sculptures and sculptors have also won. In 2021 the award was won by the artist and film-maker Emily Beaney for an experimental documentary. The award is open to any nationality, but the exhibition participants must be based and active in Scotland. The 1994 winner Joe Fan was originally from Hong Kong; the 2008 winner Trine Pedersen was originally from Denmark; the 2023 winner Daniel Nelis is originally from Ireland.

== Members and non-members of the RSA ==
The under 35 age requirement and the sheer number of exhibits - now around 600 annually - mean that the Guthrie Award is difficult to win more than once; however this has been done: by Heather Ross in 2006 and 2007; and by Julie-Ann Simpson in 2014 and 2019. Non-members of the RSA can apply to be in the Open exhibition, although around only a couple of hundred non-member exhibits make it through annually from the thousands of applications received, as around 400 exhibits are reserved for members.

== Prize monies and medals ==
Usually the award is awarded singularly, but on occasion the award has gone to joint winners. The award, originally made by an anonymous donor but in 1930 revealed to be the late (17th) Earl of Moray, who gave a monetary value on the capital endowment of £1000 as well as the honour of the award. Nowadays a medal is also presented. In its early years, the monetary award was £50. Today the award monies stand at £750. If the award is shared, the prize monies are also shared.

== List of Guthrie Award winners ==
The List of Guthrie Award winners is a list of artists who have won the award.

| Year | Winning Artist 1 | Work 1 | Winning Artist 2 | Work 2 | Notes |
|---|---|---|---|---|---|
| 1920 | Kate Campbell Muirhead | Elizabeth | David Macbeth Sutherland | The Painting Student | Muirhead's work was a bust sculpture, Sutherland's work a painting. |
| 1921 | Cecile Walton | To Nobody Knows Where | | | |
| 1922 | John Rankine Barclay | The Artist's Wife | | | |
| 1923 | James Wallace Ferguson | A Visitor | | | |
| 1924 | Donald Moodie | Autumn Day | George William Salvesen | The Dance | Moodie for a painting, Salvesen for a sculpture. |
| 1925 | Laelia Armine Cockburn | A Rough Lot for Sale | | | |
| 1926 | David Shanks Ewart | The Toilers | | | |
| 1927 | Ancell Stronach | The Unexpected Meeting | | | |
| 1928 | William Crozier | The 'Cello Player | Margaret Findlay | The Bathers | Findlay's work a sculpture, Crozier's work a painting. |
| 1929 | William Lamb | Ferryden Fisher Wife | | | A sculpture. |
| 1930 | Robert Sivell | Miss Jean O. H. Morton | | | |
| 1931 | Ian Campbell | Self Portrait | | | |
| 1932 | Alister Maitland | Alice Ann | | | He was noted at the time as the youngest winner, aged 21. |
| 1933 | Thomas Whalen | The Amazon | | | For 3 sculpture works The Amazon, Mother's Kisses, and Torso. |
| 1934 | William Wilson | The Alcazar, Segovia | | | For a group of Wilson's work. The named piece was a drawing. Wilson was a noted engraver. |
| 1935 | James McIntosh Patrick | Marion | | | |
| 1936 | Alexander George Oliphant | David Kerr Esq. | | | |
| 1937 | Mary Nicol Neill Armour | Cantaloupe | | | |
| 1938 | Ian Fleming | The Painters: McBryde and Colquhoun | | | |
| 1939 | William Drummond Bone | Leisure | | | |
| 1940 | Scott Sutherland | Labor Vincit | | | A sculpture. |
| 1941 | David Abercrombie Donaldson | Alfred | | | |
| 1942 | James Alan Davie | Brenda Mark | | | |
| 1943 | Alberto Morrocco | Leon | Colin Gibson | Lisbeth | |
| 1944 | Margaret Kennedy Mackenzie | Pieta | Gordon Stewart Cameron | Boy with Apple | Mackenzie's work was sculpture, Cameron's work was a painting. |
| 1945 | Robert Henderson Blyth | Winter in Walkerburn, 1939 | | | |
| 1946 | George William Lennox Paterson | Frank Tweedie and the Birds | | | |
| 1947 | James Hillocks | Portrait of my Mother | | | |
| 1948 | Sinclair Thomson | The White Shawl | | | |
| 1949 | Alistair J. T. Paterson | Still Life | | | |
| 1950 | Tom M. Macnair | Jean Hannan | | | A terracotta sculpture of a head. |
| 1951 | Robin Philipson | Brenda, Spring Portrait | | | |
| 1952 | Ellen Malcolm | Portrait of a Young Man | | | |
| 1953 | William Alexander Burns | Sunday | | | |
| 1954 | Ann Henderson | Composition | | | A sculpture. |
| 1955 | Brenda Clouston | Youth | | | A sandstone sculpture. |
| 1956 | David McClure | ? | | | McClure exhibited five works:- Harbour, Millport; The Green Hill; Trees, Millport; Self portrait; and Flowers At A Window. |
| 1957 | Brenda Mark | Figures In Moonlight | | | |
| 1958 | Margot Sandeman | The Walk Across The Fields | | | |
| 1959 | Jean Fleming | ?Landscape painting | | | |
| 1960 | John Houston | Pigeons and Village | David Alan Redpath Michie | Red Flower | |
| 1961 | William Hunter Littlejohn | Painting 1960 | | | Littlejohn had 3 paintings at the exhibition; the other two being White Glass and Green Bottle, each a still life work. Littlejohn considered that it was his abstract work Painting 1960 that had won the Guthrie Award. |
| 1962 | Elizabeth Blackadder | Still Life on a White Table | | | Blackadder had another two works: Auray; and Breton Church. |
| 1963 | Alex Campbell | Rehearsal | | | |
| 1964 | Bill Scott | Seated Figure | | | A sculpture. |
| 1965 | Robert Callender | Ludo | | | |
| 1966 | George Alexander Macpherson | ? | | | |
| 1967 | Archibald Dunbar McIntosh | ? | | | |
| 1968 | John Knox | Swing and Stool - After Uccello | | | |
| 1969 | Alexander Fraser | Shankar at the Blue Piggery | | | |
| 1970 | Leon Morrocco | Figure in a Bedroom | | | |
| 1971 | Ian McKenzie Smith | Reflections (Harbour) | | | |
| 1972 | Frances Pelly | Greenheart Woman | | | |
| 1973 | George Donald | Virginia's Quilt | | | A padded canvas work. |
| 1974 | ? | ? | | | |
| 1975 | ? | ? | | | |
| 1976 | | | | Award withheld. | |
| 1977 | Barbara Rae | Sea Dreamers | | | |
| 1978 | Ian Howard | Misdirection | | | |
| 1979 | Ronald Forbes | ? | | | Forbes exhibited two works: All Set; and Scarecrow |
| 1980 | ? | ? | | | |
| 1981 | Martin Churchill | Palace Hotel | | | |
| 1982 | John Mooney | ? | | | |
| 1983 | Ian Robertson | ? | | | |
| 1984 | Lennox Dunbar | Sweep | | | |
| 1985 | David Cook | Fooled You | | | |
| 1986 | ? | ? | | | |
| 1987 | Fiona Dean | Still Life With Work Objects | | | |
| 1988 | ? | ? | | | |
| 1989 | Jacqui Miller Nixon | Warrior | | | |
| 1990 | Joseph Davie | ? | | | Davie submitted two works:- A Journal Of The Blackout: Unwelcome Heroes; and The Spirit Of The Community |
| 1991 | ? | ? | | | |
| 1992 | ? | ? | | | |
| 1993 | David Hosie | ? | | | |
| 1994 | Joe Fan | In Evil Hours | | | |
| 1995 | Philip Braham | ? | | | |
| 1996 | Robbie Bushe | Laughing Boys, Tomorrow They Will Be Gone | | | |
| 1997 | Stephen Mangan | ? | | | |
| 1998 | Barry McGlashan | ? | | | |
| 1999 | Alasdair Wallace | Field | | | |
| 2000 | Delia Baillie | Fantasies of the Dustbin | | | |
| 2001 | Kevin Dagg | ? | | | A sculpture. |
| 2002 | ? | ? | | | |
| 2003 | ? | ? | | | |
| 2004 | Steven MacIver | ? | | | |
| 2005 | ? | ? | | | |
| 2006 | Heather Ross | ? | | | |
| 2007 | Heather Ross | ? | | | |
| 2008 | Trine Pedersen | ? | | | |
| 2009 | Sharon Thomas | ? | | | |
| 2010 | ? | ? | | | |
| 2011 | Briony Anderson | ? | | | |
| 2012 | ? | ? | | | |
| 2013 | ? | ? | | | |
| 2014 | Julie-Ann Simpson | Among Silver Birches | | | |
| 2015 | Georgia Rose Murray | Rainbow Trout Cormorant Noir | | | |
| 2016 | Emily Moore | First Lift, Last Lift | | | |
| 2017 | Kristina Chan | Leith Theatre, The Stage | | | A laser etched woodcut. |
| 2018 | Ed Compson | Shutterstock Infinity Klee | | | An oil & laser etching on board. |
| 2019 | Julie-Ann Simpson | Stings To Be Gathered | | | |
| 2020 | | | | | Online exhibition due to coronavirus pandemic |
| 2021 | Emily Beaney | Breaking the Fall | | | A trilogy of experimental documentaries. |
| 2022 | Claire Moore | The Murder of Mr Muster | | | |
| 2023 | Daniel Nelis | Dark Turned Fields | | | |
| 2024 | Rae-Yen Song | Song Dynasty Beast | | | Sculptural costume |
| 2025 | James Howden | Tyrant | | | Sculpture |
