= Dorothy Johnstone =

Scottish painter and watercolourist

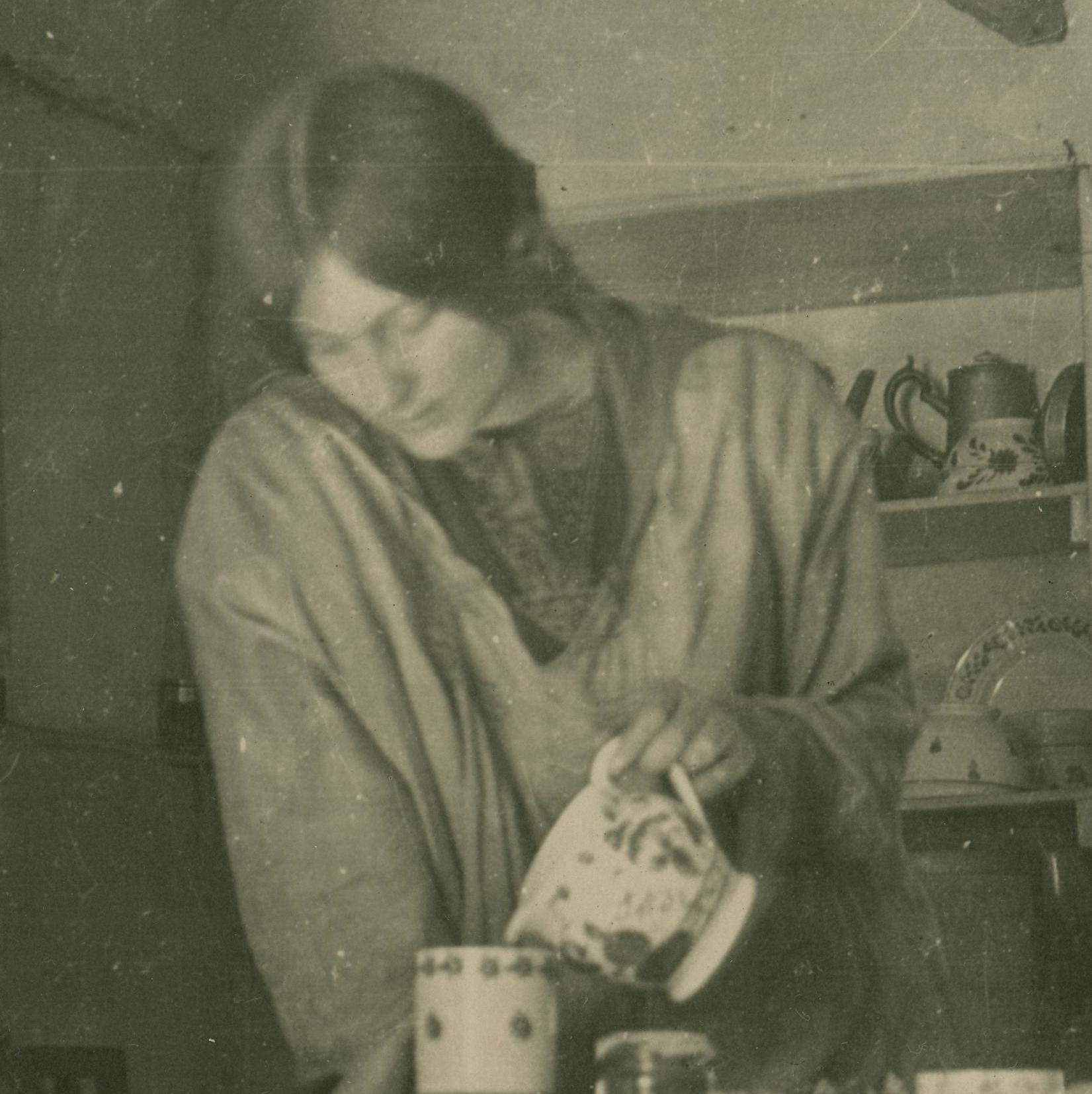
- in 1918
- Born: 25 December 1892; Edinburgh, Scotland
- Died: 15 July 1980 (aged 87); Bodelwyddan, Wales
- Education: Edinburgh College of Art

Dorothy Johnstone (1892–1980) was a Scottish painter and watercolourist.

== Life ==
Johnstone was born in Edinburgh in 1892 and grew up in Napier Road, near the Gothic Mansion, Rockville. Her father, landscape artist George Whitton Johnstone RSA (1849–1901), encouraged her artistic talents, and at the age of 16 she enrolled as a student at the Edinburgh College of Art. She took the Life Class with Ernest Stephen Lumsden where she revealed her talents at informal portraiture, a genre for which she became well known. In 1914 she became a member of staff at the Edinburgh College of Art. From the summer of 1915, she became a regular annual visitor to Kirkcudbright in Galloway, where she would paint with other mainly female artists including Jessie M. King as part of the Kirkcudbright School. Dorothy Johnstone, with her close friends Cecile Walton and Mary Newbery, was a member of The Edinburgh School, which reformed in 1919, a collective of gifted and progressive artists associated with the Edinburgh College of Art. During 1919 she was living in Kirkcudbright where she had an affair with Vera Holme who had been Emmeline Pankhurst's chauffeur before the Great War.

In 1924, at the peak of her artistic career, Johnstone mounted a joint exhibition in Edinburgh with fellow artist Cecile Walton. She married her colleague and fellow group member David Macbeth Sutherland in 1924. They had a son, Sir Iain Sutherland, in 1925, and a daughter in 1928. As a consequence of her husband's appointment in 1933 as head of Gray's School of Art in Aberdeen (now at Robert Gordon's University) and of the marriage bar in place at the time, she gave up her career and her students. She kept her links with Edinburgh by continuing to exhibit her portraits and landscapes at the Royal Scottish Academy, to which she was elected an Associate (ARSA) in 1962.

Johnstone painted landscapes and portraits, particularly of children, and her style was free and relaxed, whether using oil, watercolour, pencil or chalk. Some of her work is displayed at the National Gallery of Scotland. When she died in 1980, she bequeathed her important early painting 'Marguerites' (painted in 1912) to the Royal Scottish Academy.

== Selected bibliography ==
- "Dorothy Johnstone ARSA 1892-1980: A memorial exhibition: Aberdeen Art Gallery, Schoolhill, Aberdeen 18 December-15 January 1983," The Fine Art Society, Dundas Street, Edinburgh, 29 January – 1 March 1983 ISBN 9780900017100
- "Modern Scottish Women Painters and Sculptors 1885-1965," Editor Alice Strang. National Galleries of Scotland. ISBN 9781906270896
