= Alberto Morrocco =

Scottish artist

- Born: 14 December 1917; Aberdeen, Scotland
- Died: 10 March 1998 (aged 80); Dundee, Scotland
- Education: Gray's School of Art
- Known for: Painting
- Awards: Guthrie Award, 1943

Alberto Morrocco OBE FRSA FRSE RSW RP RGI LLD (14 December 1917 – 10 March 1998) was a Scottish artist and teacher. He is famous for his works featuring landscapes of Scotland and abroad, still-life, figure painting and interiors, but perhaps his best known works are his beach scenes and views of Venice.

== Early life ==
Morrocco was born in Aberdeen in 1917, the son of Italian immigrants, Domenic Antonio Marrocco and Celesta Crolla. His father had an ice cream shop in the city and the signwriter accidentally wrote the name as Morrocco and the name then stuck.

== Education ==
He studied at Gray's School of Art under Robert Sivell between 1932 and 1938, and in France, Italy and Switzerland. He is famous for his landscape paintings of Scotland and abroad, still life, figure painting and interiors, but perhaps his best known works are his beach scenes and views of Venice.

== Inspirations ==
The avant-garde of the twenties and thirties, in particular Braque and Picasso, had an immense influence on him for the rest of his life. The outbreak of the Second World War saw him detained in Edinburgh Castle, as an enemy alien, but he was released and allowed to serve as a conscientious objector in the Royal Army Medical Corps. After the war Morrocco had a brief spell teaching evening classes. From 1950 onwards Morrocco spent his professional life in Dundee, as Head of the School of Painting at the Duncan of Jordanstone College of Art, which is now part of the University of Dundee. He produced murals for St. Columba's Church in Glenrothes and for Royal Dundee Liff Hospital in Dundee.

Morrocco was prolific, especially in retirement, producing some of his most vigorous work in the period from 1982 to his death. Even late in his life and seriously ill, he would commit himself to exhibitions of thirty or forty new works in a year.

Morrocco and his wife Vera Mercer had three children, Leon, Laurie and Annalisa. Leon followed in his father's footsteps and became an established artist in his own right. Laurie is a conservator of early panel paintings and Annalisa a designer and illustrator.

Alberto died at his home, Binrock House in Dundee, on 10 March 1998.

== Principal works ==
- Camilla Uytman (1956)
- Colonel George Baxter of Invereighty (1956)
- John Cameron, Lord Cameron (1974)

== Awards and recognitions ==
The University of Dundee awarded Morrocco an honorary doctorate in 1980. He painted portraits of all its Principals and, in 1977, the Queen Mother as Chancellor. He was awarded the San Vita Romano Prize and both the Guthrie Award and the Carnegie Award of the Royal Scottish Academy, where he was elected Fellow in 1962.

In addition to the degree from Dundee University, he was awarded an honorary doctorate from the University of Stirling in 1987. He served on the Scottish Arts Council and the Royal Fine Art Commission for Scotland and was appointed OBE in 1993.

Morrocco was a member of the Royal Glasgow Institute of the Fine Arts (RGI) and the Royal Scottish Society of Painters in Watercolour (RSW).
