= Donald Moodie =

Scottish artist and academic

Donald Moodie RSA PSSA
- Born: 1892; Edinburgh
- Died: 1963 (aged 70–71); Edinburgh
- Citizenship: British
- Education: George Heriot School Edinburgh College of Art
- Occupations: Artist, Academic
- Known for: Landscape artworks
- Spouse: Susan Anderson Binnie
- Children: Kathleen Moodie Margaret Moodie
- Honours: Guthrie Award, 1924

Donald Moodie, RSA PSSA (1892–1963) was a Scottish artist and academic, who was president of the Society of Scottish Artists 1937–41. He was honoured with the Royal Scottish Academy's Guthrie Award in 1924.

== Early life ==
Moodie was born in Edinburgh on 24 March 1892 and attended George Heriot's School. He later studied art at Edinburgh College of Art, where he was awarded a postgraduate scholarship in 1914. He served in World War One as a Second Lieutenant with the Machine gun corps with the 5th Battalion of The Royal Scots. Seeing action in the Gallipoli Campaign, he was wounded and mentioned in Dispatches.

He married Susan Anderson Binnie, a graduate of medicine from the University of Edinburgh, in 1925 at Lynmill, Avonbridge and together they had two daughters Kathleen and Margaret.

== Career ==
He is known for painting in the medium of both oils and watercolour where he created landscapes, still-life, portraiture and murals. In 1919, he joined the staff at Edinburgh College of Art, where he taught alongside John Maxwell and Sir William Gillies. In 1937, he participated in the Empire Exhibition in Glasgow, where he produced mural paintings for Basil Spence's pavilion for Imperial Chemical Industries [ICI]. Moodie was elected president of the Scottish Society of Artists from 1937 to 1942. Subsequently, he was elected into the Royal Scottish Academy in 1943. In 1955, he retired from college teaching and became secretary of the RSA in 1959, where he remained in office until shortly before he died in Edinburgh in 1963.

His work was widely exhibited in the RSA with over 100 displays. His work is displayed in Aberdeen, Glasgow and Kirkcaldy Art Galleries and in the City of Edinburgh Council.
