= John Houston (painter) =

Scottish painter (1930–2008)

- Born: 1 April 1930; Buckhaven, Scotland
- Died: 27 September 2008 (aged 78); Edinburgh
- Education: Edinburgh College of Art
- Awards: Guthrie Award, 1960 (joint winner)

John Houston, OBE, RSA (1 April 1930 – 27 September 2008) was a Scottish painter.

Houston was born in Buckhaven, Fife, raised in nearby Windygates, and educated at Buckhaven High School and Edinburgh College of Art. An early career as a semi-professional footballer with Dundee United was ended by a knee injury in 1951.

Houston taught at Edinburgh College of Art between 1955 and 1989. In the late 1950s he co-founded and exhibited at the 57 Gallery, one of the first artist-run spaces in Edinburgh. He painted landscapes in an expressionist style and was noted for his still life (flower and vase) subjects . His works are on display at many Scottish art galleries. He was elected to the Royal Scottish Academy in 1972 and was accorded a retrospective at the Scottish National Gallery of Modern Art in 2005.

Houston received an Honorary Doctorate from Heriot-Watt University in 2004

== Personal life ==
He was married to the painter Dame Elizabeth Blackadder until his death. The couple lived in Queen's Crescent, Newington, and on Fountainhall Road, Edinburgh.
