= David Macbeth Sutherland =

Scottish painter (1883–1973)

D. M. Sutherland
- Born: David Macbeth Sutherland; 1883; Wick, Scotland
- Died: 20 September 1973 (aged 89–90); Plockton, Scotland
- Education: Edinburgh College of Art; Royal Scottish Academy
- Known for: Painting, teaching
- Awards: Guthrie Award, 1920 (joint winner)

David Macbeth Sutherland MC LLD RSA (1883 – 20 September 1973) was a Scottish artist mainly known for his landscapes and portraits paintings and for his long tenure as the Director of Gray's School of Art in Aberdeen.

== Biography ==
Sutherland was born in Wick, Caithness in 1883 and began to study law but moved to Edinburgh to work as an apprentice in a lithographic business. He left that post to study at the Royal Scottish Academy (RSA), under Charles Mackie, and at the Edinburgh College of Art. Sutherland was awarded the RSA Carnegie Travelling Scholarship in 1911 and travelled to Spain, France and the Netherlands. A year later he joined with Alick Riddell Sturrock, John Guthrie Spence Smith, William Mervyn Glass, Eric Robertson, William Oliphant Hutchison and later Adam Bruce Thomson to form the Edinburgh Group of young Scottish artists sharing a studio at 21 Picardy Place, Edinburgh. During World War I he was awarded the Military Cross while serving with the 16th Royal Scots McCrae's Battalion. He returned to the Edinburgh College of Art, and with Mary Newbery and Dorothy Johnstone ARSA (1892-1980), helped to revive the Edinburgh group. He taught the gifted students William George Gillies and William MacTaggart In 1924 Sutherland and Dorothy Johnstone were married and they had a daughter, Anne, and a son, Sir Iain Johnstone Sutherland who had a distinguished career as a British diplomat and was an Ambassador to the Soviet Union between 1982 and 1985. David Sutherland left Edinburgh in 1933 to take up the Directorship of Gray's School of Art in Aberdeen, now part of Robert Gordon's University. During World War II he was appointed an Official War Artist recording Newfoundland lumberjacks on Deeside. He was Inspector of Arts in the Highland Division and painted the landscapes of the North West coast of Scotland including Caithness, Wester Ross, Plockton and Aberdeenshire. The Sutherlands retired to east Aberdeenshire in 1948. David Sutherland is mainly known for his Scottish and Breton landscapes and portraits with many on display at the Aberdeen Art Gallery. He died in Plockton on 20 September 1973.
