= Royal Scottish Society of Painters in Watercolour =

The Royal Scottish Society of Painters in Watercolour (RSW) is a Scottish art society established in 1878. The current patron is Charles III. It is a registered charity based in Glasgow and holds an annual exhibition.

The first preliminary meeting of the society took place in Glasgow on 21 December 1877 as a reaction to a lack of interest in watercolour art by existing exhibitors. The society was inaugurated on 4 March 1878 with the election of its first president, Sir Francis Powell and vice president, Sam Bough. Its first exhibition of 172 pictures took place in November.

It was founded to "promote, through exhibition, the medium of watercolour and encourage the bold, free and colourful qualities of Scottish Painting."

The society received permission from Queen Victoria to use the prefix "Royal" in February 1888. In around 1894 the society changed its rules to allow female artists to be admitted with the same privileges as male artists.

Throughout its history many renowned artists have been members, including David McClure, William McTaggart, Adam Bruce Thomson, Claire Harrigan, George Paul Chalmers, Alison Dunlop, William Somerville Shanks, Elizabeth Blackadder and Barbara Rae.

Past presidents include William J. L. Baillie (1975–1988), Ian McKenzie Smith (1988–1998), the printmaker Philip Reeves (1998–2005), and John Inglis (2005–2016); the current president is Anthea Gage.

Past vice presidents include Alison Dunlop, Helga Chart, Gregor Smith and Iona Montgomery.

== See also ==
- Scottish art
- Royal Watercolour Society
- Royal Institute of Painters in Water Colours
- Visual Arts Scotland
