= Gray's School of Art =

Art college of Robert Gordon University

Coordinates: 57°7′5″N 2°8′56″W

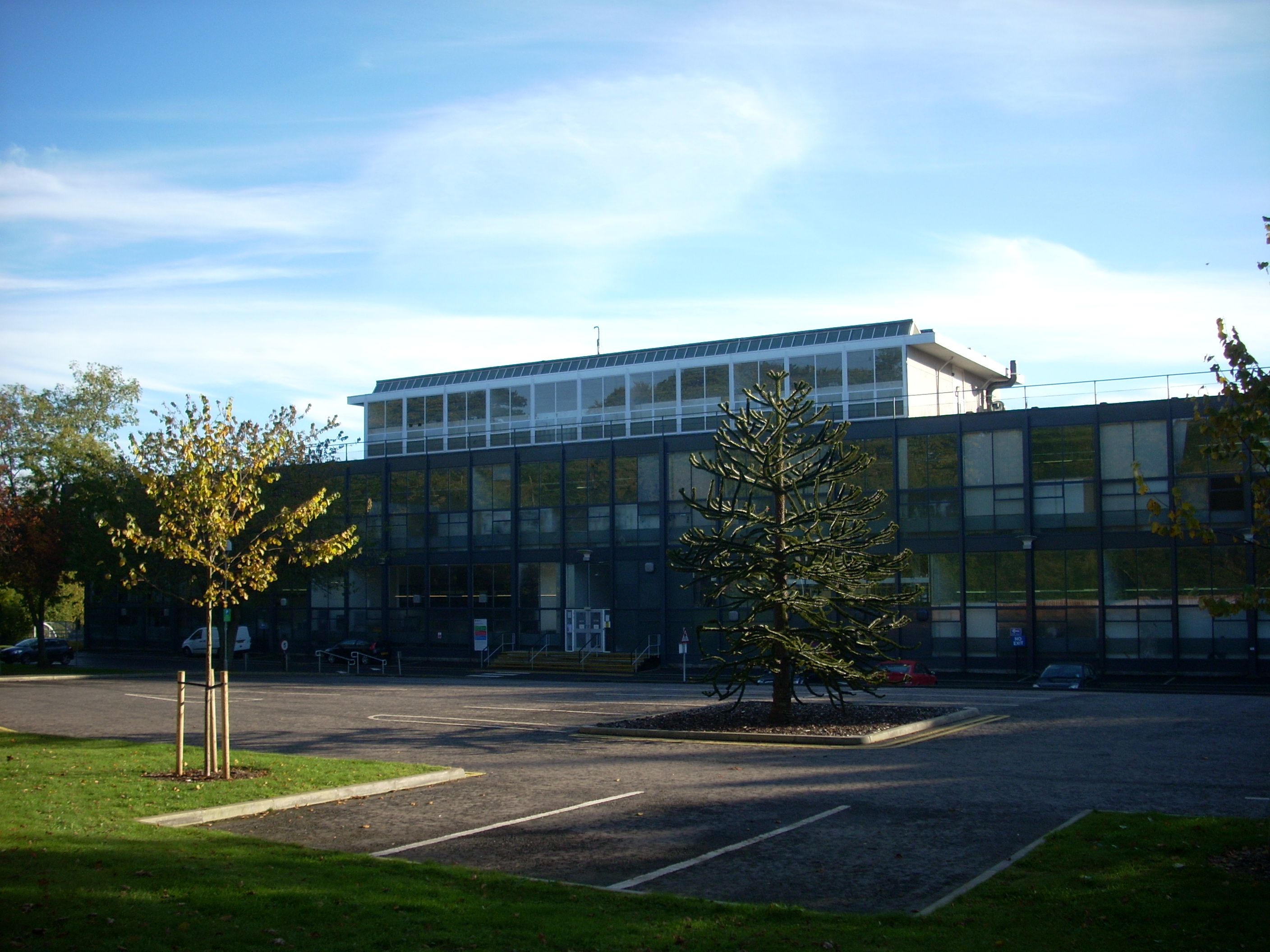
- Type: Art school
- Established: 7 September 1885; 140 years ago
- Location: Aberdeen, Scotland
- Head of School: Libby Curtis
- Affiliations: The Robert Gordon University
- Website: Gray's School of Art

Gray's School of Art is an art school located in Aberdeen, Scotland. Part of Robert Gordon University, it is one of the oldest established fine art institutions in Scotland and one of Scotland's five art schools today, and ranked among the Top 20 Schools of Art and Design in the United Kingdom. The School is housed in a building at the university's Garthdee campus in Aberdeen.

== History ==
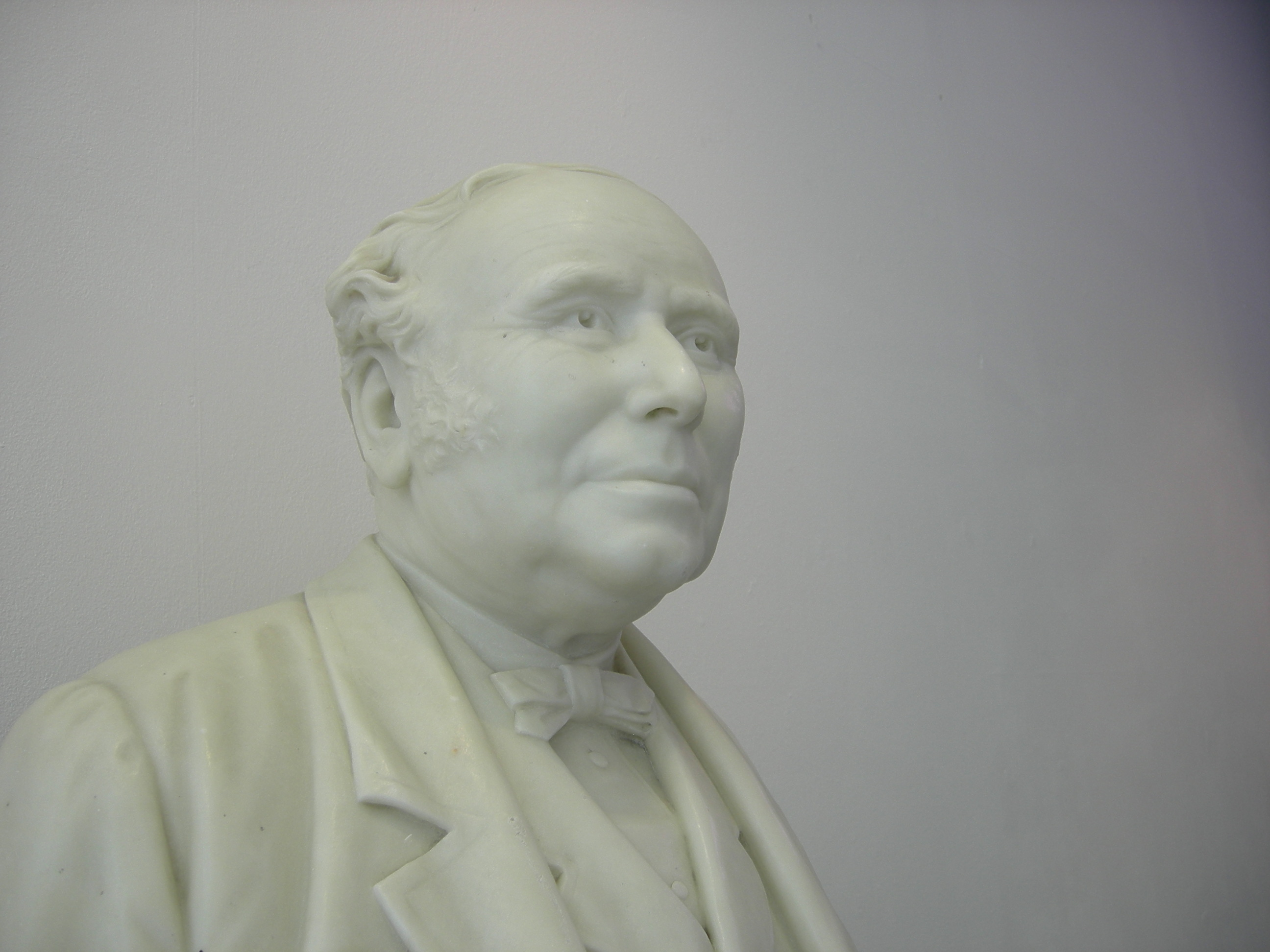
Bust of businessman John Gray, after whom Gray's School of Art is named

Gray's School of Science and Art was opened on 7 September 1885. and officially opened by the Lord Provost of Aberdeen James Matthews on 16 November. It was named after John Gray (1811–1891), a local businessman and an early investor in the school. In 1859 he was appointed director of the Aberdeen Mechanics Institution, one of the city institutions which would develop into The Robert Gordon University.

In the early 1880s, John Gray offered to finance a new school of science and art in Aberdeen, on the condition that the governors named it Gray's School of Science and Art. The school opened in 1885 with 96 students enrolled for the day classes and 322 for the evening classes. It was housed in a building at Schoolhill in the city centre next to the Aberdeen Art Gallery. By the 1960s the school had outgrown the building, and moved to a new building at Garthdee, next to the Scott Sutherland School of Architecture.

In 2026, first-year student Molly Duncan sent an open letter to Gray's School of Art calling on it to ban the use of artificial intelligence.

== Garthdee Campus ==
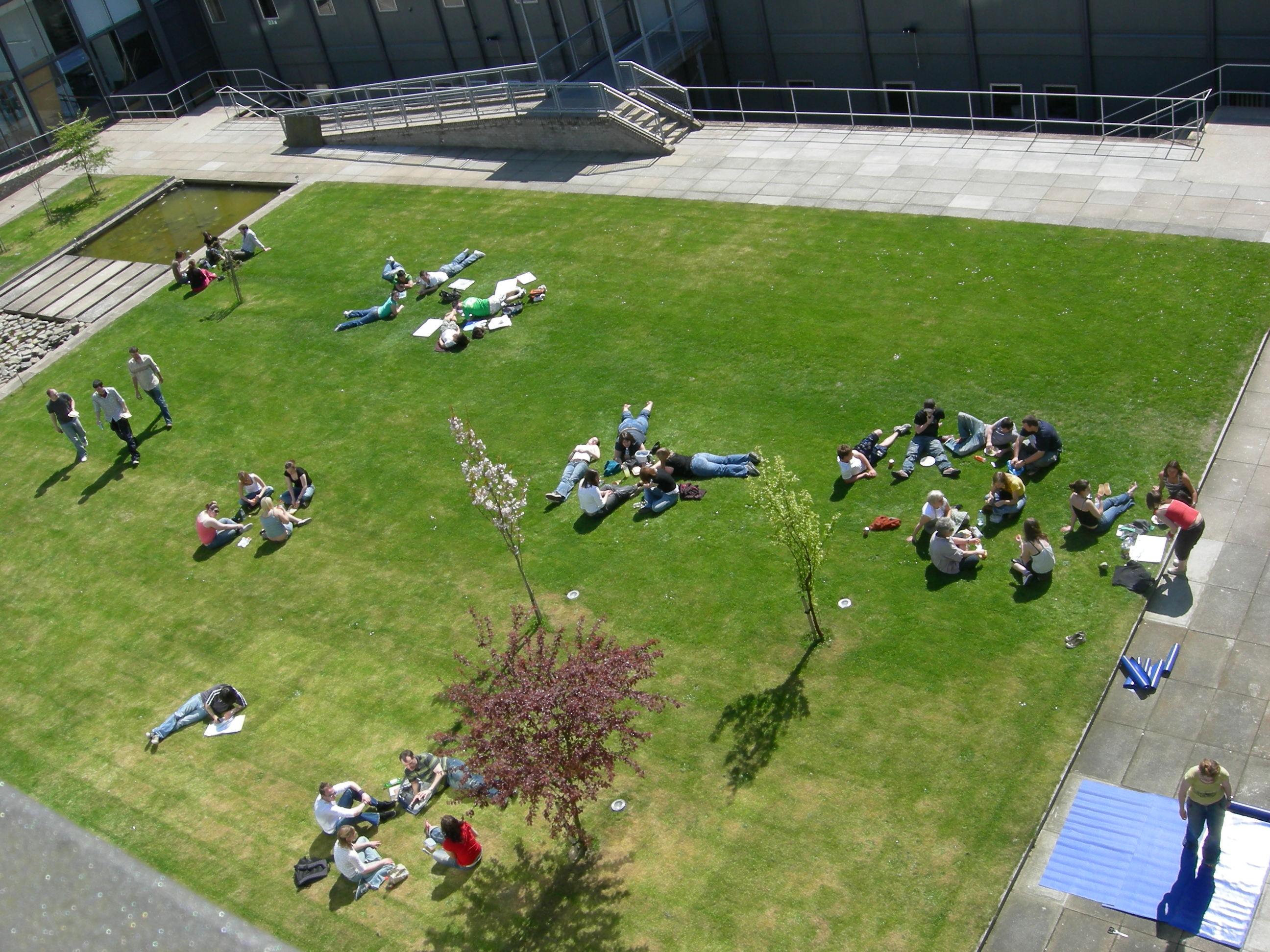
Gray's School of Art Quad

In the early 1950s, Tom Scott Sutherland (1899–1963), an Aberdeen architect who had attended the School of Architecture at Robert Gordon's Technical College gifted Garthdee House and its surrounding estate to the School of Architecture, along with a substantial endowment. The relocated school opened at Garthdee in 1956 as the Scott Sutherland School of Architecture.

The current building was designed by Michael Shewan and was influenced by the Illinois Institute of Technology campus (particularly the S. R. Crown Hall) designed by the American modernist architect Ludwig Mies van der Rohe. It is one of the 60 DoCoMoMo Key Scottish Monuments, a list of notable Scottish post-war buildings selected as significant examples of architectural style, building materials and location. These facilities include studios for painting and drawing, printmaking, photography, ceramics, jewellery, 3D design, as well as computer labs and life model changing rooms.

== Areas of study ==
Gray's offers training in a wide range of fine art, applied art and design disciplines. All courses employ a general first year where students study elements of each subject area as a "taster", before choosing an area of specialism from second year to graduation.

Design Courses

- BA (Hons) Communication Design
- BA (Hons) Fashion and Textile Design
- BA (Hons) Three Dimensional Design

Fine Art Courses

- BA (Hons) Contemporary Art Practice
- BA (Hons) Painting

Degree-Link Course

- BA (Hons) Commercial Photography

Postgraduate Programmes

- MFA/MDES in Contextualised Practice
- Masters of Research in Art and Design
- MPhil/PhD Research in Art and Design

== Notable alumni ==
- Tako Taal, Welsh-Gambian artist & filmmaker.
- Mary McMurtrie, Scottish botanical artist & horticulturalist.
- Colin Gibson, Guthrie Award winner, artist and journalist
- Ola Gorie, Orcadian jeweller
- Joyce Laing, art therapist
