= Landscape painting in Scotland =

Overview of landscape art in Scotland

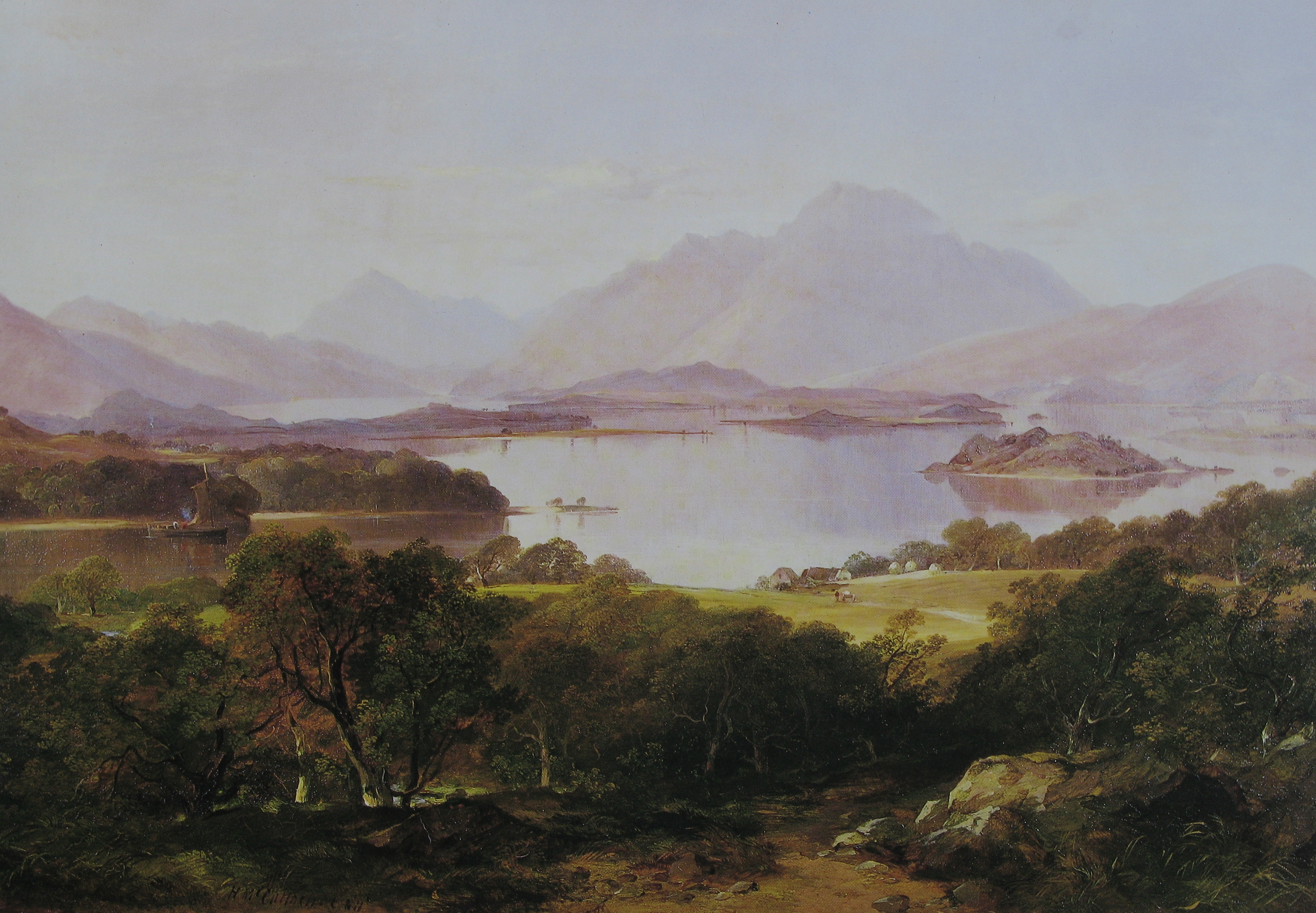
Horatio McCulloch, Loch Lomond, 1861

Landscape painting in Scotland includes all forms of painting of landscapes in Scotland since its origins in the sixteenth century to the present day. The earliest examples of Scottish landscape painting are in the tradition of Scottish house decoration that arose in the sixteenth century. Often said to be the earliest surviving painted landscape created in Scotland is a depiction by the Flemish artist Alexander Keirincx undertaken for Charles I.

The capriccios of Italian and Dutch landscapes undertaken as house decoration by James Norie and his sons in the eighteenth century brought the influence of French artists such as Claude Lorrain and Nicolas Poussin. Students of the Nories included Jacob More, who produced Claudian-inspired landscapes. This period saw a shift in attitudes to the Highlands and mountain landscapes to interpreting them as aesthetically pleasing exemplars of nature. Watercolours were pioneered in Scotland by Paul Sandby and Alexander Runciman. Alexander Nasmyth has been described as "the founder of the Scottish landscape tradition", and produced both urban landscapes and rural scenes that combine Claudian principles of an ideal landscape with the reality of Scottish topography. His students included major landscape painters of the early nineteenth century such as Andrew Wilson, the watercolourist Hugh William Williams, John Thompson of Duddingston, and probably the artists that would be most directly influenced by Nasmyth, John Knox. In the Victorian era, the tradition of Highland landscape painting was continued by figures such as Horatio McCulloch, Joseph Farquharson and William McTaggart, described as the "Scottish Impressionist". The fashion for coastal painting in the later nineteenth century led to the establishment of artist colonies in places such as Pittenweem and Crail.

The first significant group of Scottish artists to emerge in the twentieth century were the Scottish Colourists in the 1920s. They were John Duncan Fergusson, Francis Cadell, Samuel Peploe and Leslie Hunter, who placed an emphasis on colour above form. The group of artists connected with Edinburgh, most of whom had studied at Edinburgh College of Art during or soon after the First World War, became known as the Edinburgh School. They were influenced by French painters and the St. Ives School and their art was characterised by use of vivid and often non-naturalistic colour and the use of bold technique above form. Members included William Gillies, John Maxwell, William Crozier and William MacTaggart. William Johnstone was one of the artists most closely associated with the Scottish Renaissance, an attempt to introduce modernism into art and to create a distinctive national art. Stanley Cursiter was influenced by the Celtic revival, Post-Impressionism and Futurism. Later in his career he became a major painter of the coastline of his native Orkney. Other artists strongly influenced by modernism included James McIntosh Patrick and Edward Baird, both of whom were influenced by surrealism and the work of Bruegel.

In the post-war period the English-born Joan Eardley explored the landscapes of the Kincardineshire coast and created depictions of Glasgow tenements and children in the streets. Scottish artists that continued the tradition of landscape painting and joined the new generation of modernist artists of the highly influential St Ives School were Wilhelmina Barns-Graham and Margaret Mellis. Husband and wife Tom MacDonald and Bet Low with William Senior formed the Clyde Group, aimed at promoting political art and producing industrial landscapes. John Bellany focused on the coastal communities of his birth. The coastal theme would also be pursued by artists such as Elizabeth Ogilvy, Joyce W. Cairns and Ian Stephen.

== Origins to the eighteenth century ==
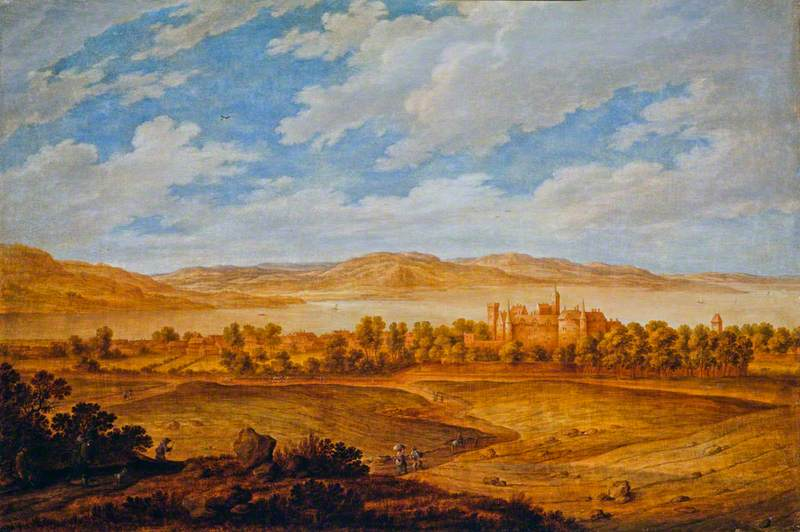
Alexander Keirincx, Seton Palace and the Forth Estuary, c. 1639

The earliest examples of Scottish landscape painting are in the tradition of Scottish house decoration for burgesses, lairds and lords, that arose after the Reformation in the sixteenth century, partly as a response to the loss of religious patronage. Most were of heraldry, classical myths and allegory, but there were a number of painted landscape scenes. These included the landscapes of four seasons in the Skelmorlie Aisle (1638) in the memorial chapel of the Montgomery family in Largs undertaken by James Stalker (fl. 1632–1638). They indicate an awareness of contemporaneous Dutch landscape painting. The Flemish artist Alexander Keirincx (1600–1652) was active in England and Scotland where he undertook commissions for Charles I, mainly of royal castles in Northern England and Scotland. These included one showing Seton House (1636–37) in its landscape, which is often said to be the earliest surviving painted landscape created in Scotland. The theme of house decoration with landscapes was taken up in the eighteenth century by James Norie (1684–1757), who worked beside the architect William Adam (1689–1748). Norie, with his sons James (1711–36) and Robert (d. 1766), painted the houses of the peerage with capriccios or pastiches of Italian and Dutch landscapes, bringing to Scotland the influence of French artists such as Claude Lorrain and Nicolas Poussin. The Nories were also important figures in professionalisation of Scottish art and the development of art education.

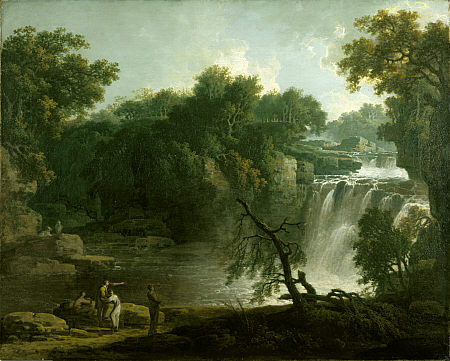
Jacob More, The Falls of Clyde: Corra Linn, c. 1771

Probably a student of the Nories was Charles Steuart (fl. 1762–90), who produced a series of Perthshire landscapes for the Duke of Atholl at Blair Castle, including The Black Lynn, Fall on the Brann (1766). Also among the students of the Nories was Jacob More, who moved to Italy from 1773 and is chiefly known as a landscape painter who created Claudian-style, classically inspired landscapes. More's series of four paintings "Falls of Clyde" (1771–73), produced before his departure to Italy, have been described by art historian Duncan Macmillan as treating the waterfalls as "a kind of natural national monument" and has been seen as an early work in developing a romantic sensibility to the Scottish landscape. This period saw a shift in attitudes to the Highlands and mountain landscapes in general, from viewing them as hostile, empty regions occupied by a backwards and marginal people, to interpreting them as aesthetically pleasing exemplars of nature, occupied by rugged primitives, which were now depicted in a dramatic fashion. Highly influential in this process was the Scottish philosopher Archibald Alison's Nature and Principles of Taste (1790), which widened the forms of landscape seen as appropriate for painting, placing an emphasis on their historical significance and emotional impact on the painter.

Paul Sandby (1731–1809), often considered the "father of British watercolour painting", visited Scotland as part of the military survey that followed the 1745 Jacobite rebellion and undertook a number of studies of Scottish scenes. His abandonment of traditional pen and ink drawing, using washes of colour in order to paint directly in watercolours without pen outlines, opened the way for the creation of powerful Romantic landscapes. Alexander Runciman (1736–1785) was probably the first artist to paint Scottish landscapes in watercolours in the more romantic style that was emerging towards the end of the eighteenth century.

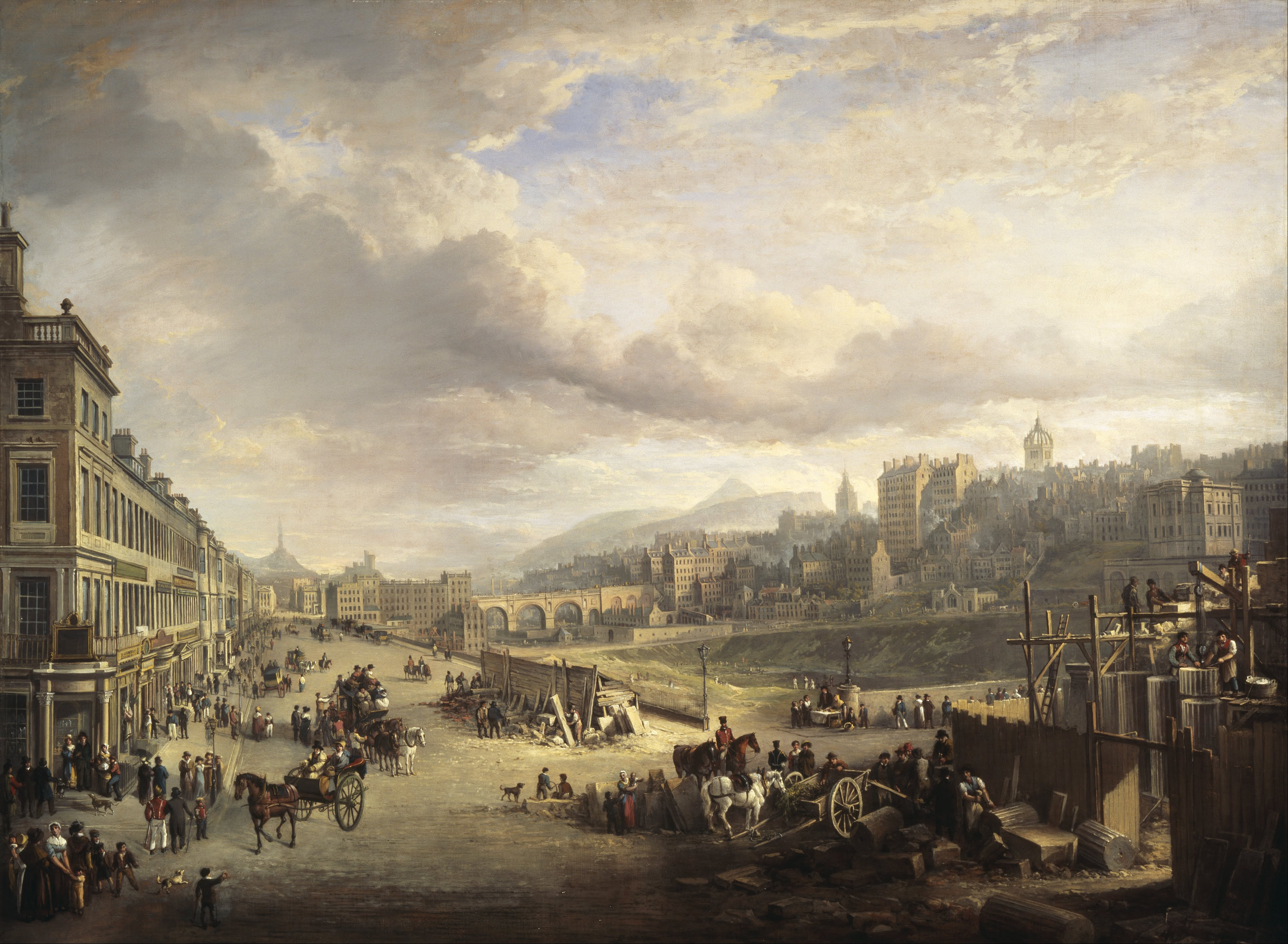
Alexander Nasmyth, Princes Street with the Commencement of the Building of the Royal Institution, 1825

Alexander Nasmyth (1758–1840) trained in the Trustees Academy in Edinburgh under Runciman. He visited Italy, where he met with More, and worked in London, but returned to his native Edinburgh for most of his career. He produced work in a large range of forms, including his portrait of Romantic poet Robert Burns, which depicts him against a dramatic Scottish background, but he is chiefly remembered for his landscapes and is described in the Oxford Dictionary of Art as "the founder of the Scottish landscape tradition". He produced both urban landscapes, like Edinburgh from Caton Hill (1825), which put Edinburgh its geological context, and rural scenes such as Castle Huntly and The Tay (c. 1800). His works combined Claudian principles of an ideal landscape with the reality of Scottish topography.

== Nineteenth century ==
Nasmyth was also a highly influential teacher at the Trustee's Academy in Edinburgh. Among his students were painters who took the landscape tradition into the nineteenth century. They included Andrew Wilson (1780–1840), who would become Master of the Academy in 1818, the watercolourist Hugh William Williams (1773–1829), clergyman and artist John Thompson of Duddingston (1778–1840) and probably the artist that would be most directly influenced by Nasmyth, John Knox (1778–1845). Williams' most famous work are interpretive versions of Greek landscapes, based on sketches taken on his travels there, among them The Temple of Poseidon, Cape Sunium (1828). His close friend John Thompson focused on a dark dramatic version of Scottish landscape, as in his most famous work Fast Castle from Below (1824). Knox directly linked Nasmyth's style with the Romantic literature of Walter Scott. Knox's Landscape with Tourists at Lock Katrine (c. 1820), was a commentary on the tourist trade that grew up in the Trossachs in the aftermath of the publication of Scott's poem The Lady of the Lake in 1810. He was also among the first artists to take a major interest in depicting the urban landscape of Glasgow. Towards the end of his career he undertook panoramic works of the views from the top of Ben Lomond, which played a part in opening up the Highlands as a spectacle that would be taken up by artists in the second half of the century.

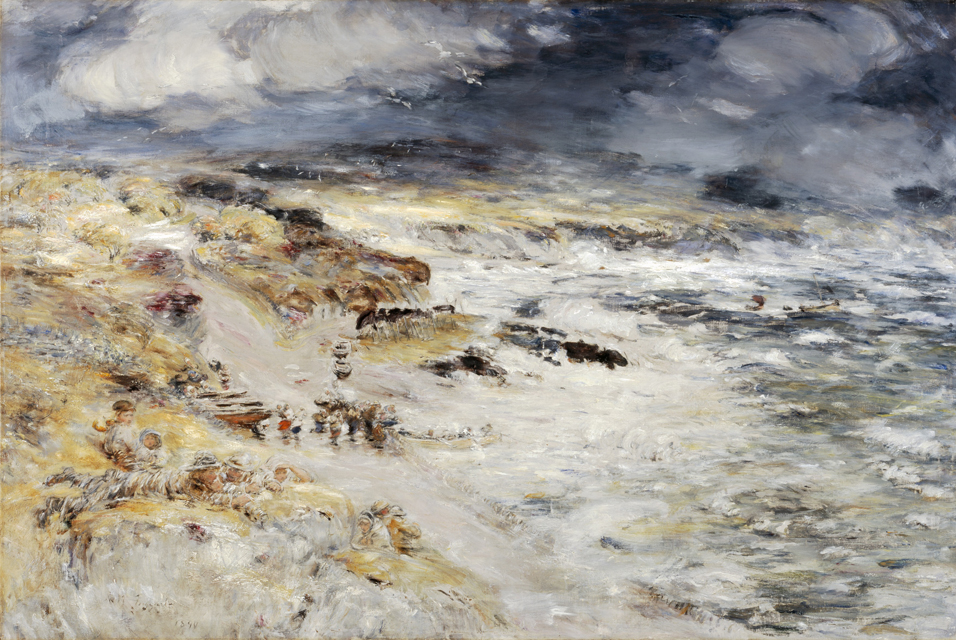
William McTaggart, The Storm, 1890

In the Victorian era, the tradition of Highland landscape painting was continued by figures such as Horatio McCulloch (1806–1867), Joseph Farquharson (1846–1935) and William McTaggart (1835–1910). McCulloch was a student of Knox. His images of places including Glen Coe, Loch Lomond and the Trossachs, became parlour room panoramas that defined popular images of Scotland. This was helped by the Queen's declared affection for Scotland, signified by her adoption of Balmoral as a royal retreat. The wildlife around Balmoral was immortalised by English painter Edwin Landseer (1802–73) in the much copied Monarch of the Glen (1851). In this period a Scottish "grand tour" developed with large number of English artists, including Turner, flocking to the Highlands to paint and draw. From the 1870s Farquharson was a major figure in interpreting Scottish landscapes, specialising in snowscapes and sheep, and using a mobile heated studio in order to capture the conditions from life. In the same period McTaggart emerged as the leading Scottish landscape painter. He has been compared with John Constable and described as the "Scottish Impressionist", with free brushwork often depicting stormy seas and moving clouds. The fashion for coastal painting in the later nineteenth century led to the establishment of artist colonies in places such as Pittenweem and Crail in Fife, Cockburnspath in the Borders, Cambuskenneth near Stirling on the River Forth and Kirkcudbright in Dumfries and Galloway. The Glasgow Boys emerged in the 1880s, rejecting much of the sentimentality of Scottish landscape painting and introducing elements of Impressionism. Key figures included W. Y. Macgregor (1855–1923), James Guthrie (1859–1930), John Lavery (1856–1941), George Henry (1858–1943) and E. A. Walton (1860–1922).

== Twentieth century to present ==
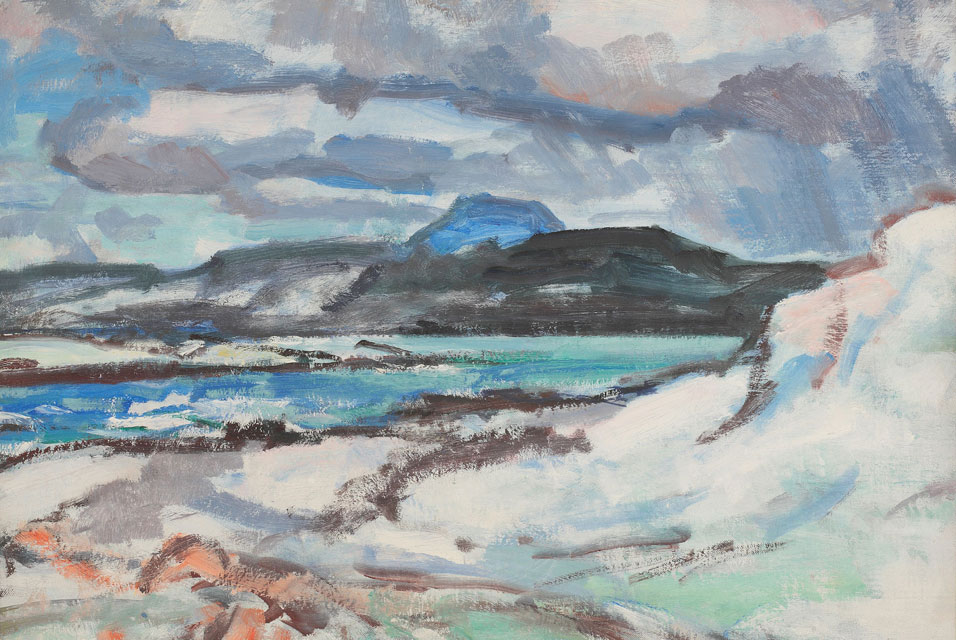
Samuel Peploe, Ben More seen from Iona, 1927

The first significant group of Scottish artists to emerge in the twentieth century were the Scottish Colourists in the 1920s. The name was later given to four artists who knew each other and exhibited together, but did not form a cohesive group. All had spent time in France between 1900 and 1914 and all looked for inspiration to Paris, particularly to the Fauvists, such as Monet, Matisse and Cézanne, whose techniques they combined with the painting traditions of Scotland. They were John Duncan Fergusson (1874–1961), Francis Cadell (1883–1937), Samuel Peploe (1871–1935) and Leslie Hunter (1877–1931). They have been described as the first Scottish modern artists and were the major mechanism by which Post-Impressionism reached Scotland. From 1912 Cadell visited Iona annually to paint and he was joined there by Peploe from 1920. They produced a number of works using the west-coast light and Iona landscape, particularly views of Ben More, which both painted several times. John Duncan, the arts and crafts artist, was still active in the early twentieth century and painted several landscapes similar in style to those of Cadell and Peploe. Hunter used a vibrant palette to create notable paintings of the landscape around Balloch on Loch Lomond. Leading architect Charles Rennie Mackintosh (1868–1928) abandoned architecture for painting after World War I and created a number of landscapes, particularly of southern France. He became associated with Fergusson, who pursued also experimental landscape in the inter-war years, many of which were around his home in the Highlands, like that at Craigcornash (c. 1925). The work of Mackintosh and Fergusson has similarities to that of David Young Cameron (1865–1945) who pursued the systematic painting of the Highlands in his later years.

The group of artists connected with Edinburgh, most of whom had studied at Edinburgh College of Art during or soon after the First World War, became known as the Edinburgh School. They were influenced by French painters and the St. Ives School and their art was characterised by use of vivid and often non-naturalistic colour and the use of bold technique above form. Members included William Gillies (1898–1973), who worked in both watercolours and oils around Ardnamurchan and Morar in the 1930s, John Maxwell (1905–62) whose landscapes were influenced by mythological themes, William Crozier (1893–1930), whose landscapes were created with glowing colours and William MacTaggart (1903–81), grandson of the nineteenth-century artist, noted for his landscapes of East Lothian, France and Norway. His Celebration of Earth, Air, Fire and Water (1978) utilised the Borders' landscape in abstract form.

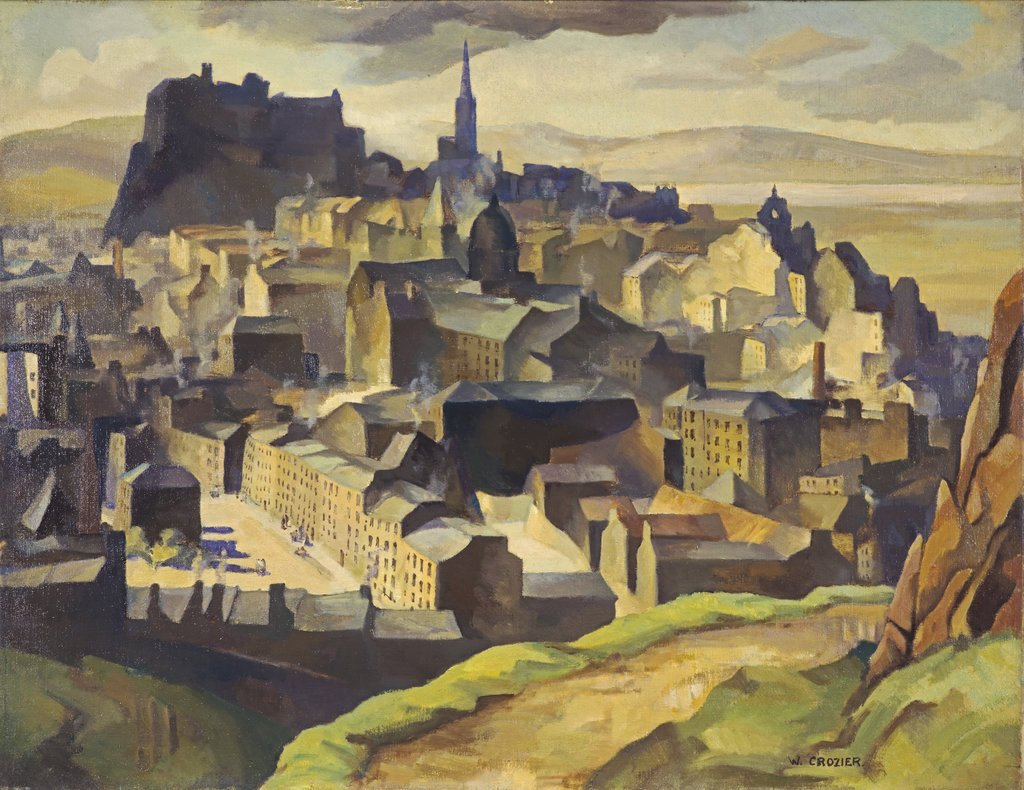
William Crozier, Edinburgh from Salisbury Crags, c. 1933

William Johnstone (1897–1981) was one of the artists most closely associated with the Scottish Renaissance, an attempt to introduce modernism into art and to create a distinctive national art. He studied cubism, surrealism and was introduced to new American art by his wife the sculptor Flora Macdonald. He moved towards abstraction, attempting to utilise aspects of landscape, poetry and Celtic art. His most significant work, A Point in Time (1929–1938), has been described by art historian Duncan Macmillan as "one of the most important Scottish pictures of the century and one of the most remarkable pictures by any British painter in the period". Stanley Cursiter (1887–1976) was influenced by the Celtic revival, post-impressionism and Futurism. Later in his career he became a major painter of the coastline of this native Orkney. Other artists strongly influenced by modernism included James McIntosh Patrick (1907–98) and Edward Baird (1904–49). Both trained in Glasgow, but spent most of their careers in and around their respective native cities of Dundee and Montrose. Both were influenced by surrealism and the work of Bruegel and focused on landscape, as can be seen in McIntosh Patrick's Traquair House (1938) and more overtly in Baird's The Birth of Venus (1934).

In the post-war period the English-born Joan Eardley (1921–63) moved to Glasgow, where she was a graduate of the Glasgow School of Art and explored the landscapes of the Kincardineshire coast and created depictions of Glasgow tenements and children in the streets. Scottish artists that continued the tradition of landscape painting and joined the new generation of modernist artists of the highly influential St Ives School were Wilhelmina Barns-Graham (1912–2004) and Margaret Mellis (1914–2009). Polish realist Josef Herman (1911–2000) was resident in Glasgow between 1940 and 1943 where he influenced husband and wife Tom MacDonald (1914–1985) and Bet Low (born 1924), who with painter William Senior (born 1927) formed the Clyde Group, aimed at promoting political art. Their work included industrial and urban landscapes such as MacDonald's Transport Depot (1944–45) and Bet Low's Blochairn Steelworks (c. 1946). John Bellany (born 1942), mainly focusing on the coastal communities of his birth, labelled "Scottish realism", was among the leading Scottish intellectuals from the 1960s. Landscape has remained a major form in Scottish painting in the work of artists such as James Morrison (born 1932), Ian MacKenzie Smith (born 1935), Duncan Shanks (born 1937) and Barbara Rae (born 1943). The coastal theme would also be pursued by artists such as Elizabeth Ogilvy (born 1946), Joyce W. Cairns (born 1947) and Ian Stephen (born 1955).

== See also ==
- Portrait painting in Scotland
