= The Fleming Collection =

Coordinates: 51.5082°N 0.1433°W

The Fleming Collection is a large private collection of Scottish art. Originally a corporate collection dominating the walls of the Flemings bank, it had a home in a gallery on Berkeley Square, central London, England from 2002 until the gallery's closure in 2016. It now operates as a loaning and touring collection.

== Origins ==
The collection began in 1968 at the instigation of the Scottish banking firm Robert Fleming & Co., founded in Dundee, Scotland. In 1968 the bank moved to a new building in Crosby Square in the City of London and art began to be bought for the purpose of decorating the space. The task of directing the art purchasing was given singularly to one of the bank's directors, David Donald. The only guideline given was that the paintings should be by Scottish artists or of Scottish scenes by any artists, to emphasise the bank's proud Scottish origins. Scottish art was largely unknown outside Scotland until the 1980s, making prices relatively low, meaning that a large collection was amassed in a short amount of time.

David Donald died unexpectedly in 1985. Earlier that year he was awarded the honour of being elected an Honorary Academician of the Royal Scottish Academy for services to Scottish art. The role of collector was continued by Robert Fleming and Bill Smith, who was later to become the first Keeper of Art. Under his guidance the Collection was moved to the new headquarters in Copthall Avenue. At this time, the Collection also began to focus more on collecting the work of living Scottish artists. By the 1990s it had gained international recognition as a collection of Scottish art and as a corporate art collection, lending artworks to numerous prestigious exhibitions in London and Scotland. After Bill Smith's retirement, Selina Skipwith became the new Keeper of Art.

== The Fleming-Wyfold Art Foundation ==
In March 2000, Flemings bank was sold to Chase Manhattan Bank, New York. To ensure the Collection was not lost, the Fleming family put forward the funds to enable a new charitable foundation, the Fleming-Wyfold Art Foundation, to purchase the collection at market value before the sale.

The collection was moved to a newly designed gallery on Berkeley Street in 2002. Over 14 years the gallery displayed a revolving series of exhibitions based on works from the Collection along with loans in, acting as a showcase for Scottish art in London. The Foundation also continued to lend works from the Fleming Collection to exhibitions internationally. In June 2010, a second gallery was opened within the premises to allow for a changing exhibition programme showing emerging and established Scottish artists as well as works from the collection.

After James Knox, previous managing director of The Art Newspaper, took over from Selina Skipwith to become Director of the Fleming Collection in 2015, it was announced that the gallery would close in March 2016, and that the Foundation would instead focus on 'loans, exhibitions, and art education', operating as a 'museum-without-walls'. The collection, still based in London, now tours in exhibition format across the country, focusing on highlights within the collection such as the Scottish Colourists and the Glasgow Girls and Boys. At the same time, individual works are continually requested for loan to prestigious institutions across the UK and Europe.

== Works in the Collection ==
The collection contains over 600 art works from the mid 17th century to the present by a large selection of Scottish artists. From the 18th and 19th centuries, artists include Allan Ramsay, Henry Raeburn, Jacob More, Sir David Wilkie, Scottish Impressionist William McTaggart and notable images of the Highland Clearances, Thomas Faed’s The Last of The Clan and John Watson Nicol's Lochaber No More.

Key groups represented include The Glasgow Boys, with works by Arthur Melville, John Lavery, Sir James Guthrie, Edward Arthur Walton, Joseph Crawhall and Edward Atkinson Hornel. The collection is also particularly known for its works by the Scottish Colourists, a group composed of Samuel John Peploe, John Duncan Fergusson, George Leslie Hunter, and Francis Campbell Boileau Cadell.

The collection includes works by 20th-century artists including James Cowie, Stanley Cursiter, Anne Redpath, William Johnstone, William George Gillies, William Geissler, Wilhelmina Barns-Graham, Robert Colquhoun, Alan Davie, Joan Eardley, Craigie Aitchison, Elizabeth Blackadder, David McClure, John Byrne, Will Maclean, John Bellany, Alison Watt, Jock McFadyen.
