= William Geissler =

Scottish artist (1894–1963)

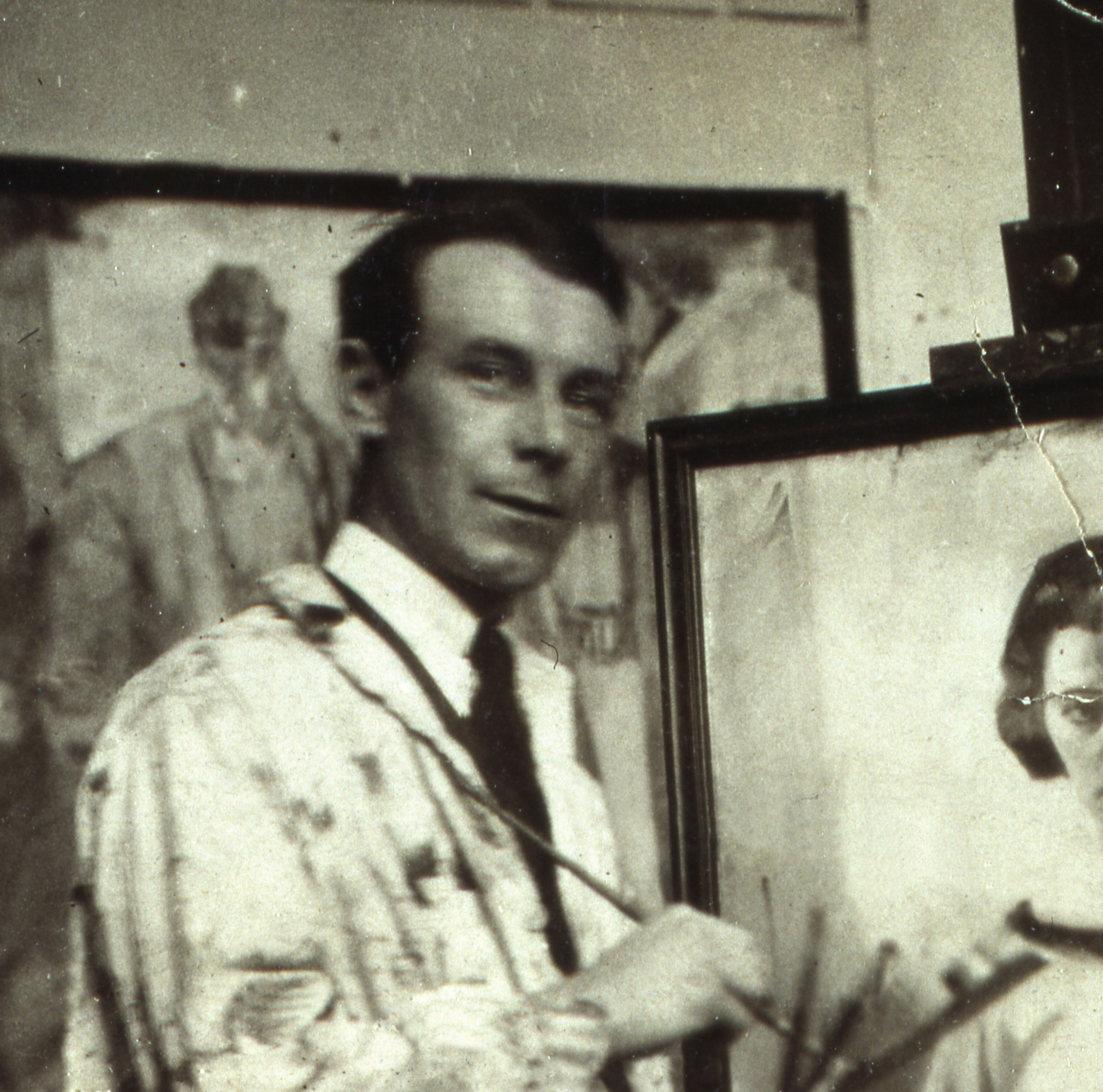
- William Geissler ca.1922, photo M.E. Burnet
- Born: William Hastie Geissler; 26 June 1894; Edinburgh, Scotland
- Died: 11 November 1963 (aged 69); Inveresk, East Lothian, Scotland
- Education: Edinburgh College of Art, André Lhote, Paris
- Known for: Painting, watercolours
- Movement: Edinburgh School
- Spouse: Alison Cornwall McDonald

William Hastie Geissler (1894 - 1963) was a Scottish artist known for his watercolours of the natural world. He was one of The Edinburgh School, and much of his earlier work came from sketching trips undertaken with other members of this group, though he himself is sometimes described as a "neglected" member. Although his natural preference lay with watercolour, often with gouache and pen and ink, several works in oil survive.

== Early life and education ==
William Geissler was the grandson of Paul Richard Geissler, who in the 1850s had emigrated from Hirschfeld, Saxony in Germany to Edinburgh, where he settled and married, pursuing a career as a music teacher for children of well-to-do families. Following the collapse of the City of Glasgow Bank in 1878, the financial conditions of Paul Richard's clients, as well as his own, became severely strained. As a result, he advised his own children to seek careers that guaranteed security. Thus it was that Hermann Richard Geissler became a railway clerk. Hermann married Jane Hastie on 26 September 1893, and William was born precisely nine months later. William was educated at James Gillespie's Primary School and Boroughmuir High School in Edinburgh, where his precocious interest in drawing was remarked early on. After the drudgery of his father's generation, William could begin to develop his inherited artistic talents. On leaving school, he was employed as an apprentice draughtsman and engraver with Thomas Nelson, the publishing firm and printer in Edinburgh. At the same time, he also attended evening classes at Edinburgh College of Art (ECA). At the outbreak of war he joined the Royal Scots Regiment and was posted to northern France in 1915, serving in the Battle of the Somme. Later in the war, in mid 1917, he was seconded to the Royal Engineers, whose need for skilled map draughtsmen was pressing.

== Post First World War Life ==
After demobilisation from the army in 1919, he attended Edinburgh College of Art as a full-time student. Geissler and William Gillies both graduated from ECA in June 1922. In 1923, Geissler, Gillies and William Crozier, having won scholarships, travelled to Paris to study with André Lhote. On his return from Paris, the formal cubist influence of Lhote in Geissler's work softened and was transformed by his own observation of the geometry of the natural world. He exhibited for several years with colleagues as a member of The 1922 Group, an association of ECA graduates who had been awarded travelling scholarships, and whose annual exhibitions were shown at the New Gallery, Shandwick Place, Edinburgh. Exhibitions included work by Geissler, Gillies, William MacTaggart (the Younger), John Maxwell and Crozier.

Geissler tutored at Edinburgh College of Art in the 1920s before being appointed Art Master at Perth Academy in 1928. In 1931, he married Alison McDonald, later known as the glass engraver Alison Geissler, with whom he had three children, Paul, Erik and Catherine. In 1935, he took a post teaching art at Moray House College of Education, becoming Head of the Art Department in 1947 until his retirement in 1962. He was a member of the Society of Scottish Artists (SSA), of which he was President from 1954 to 1957, and of the Royal Scottish Society of Painters in Watercolour (RSW).

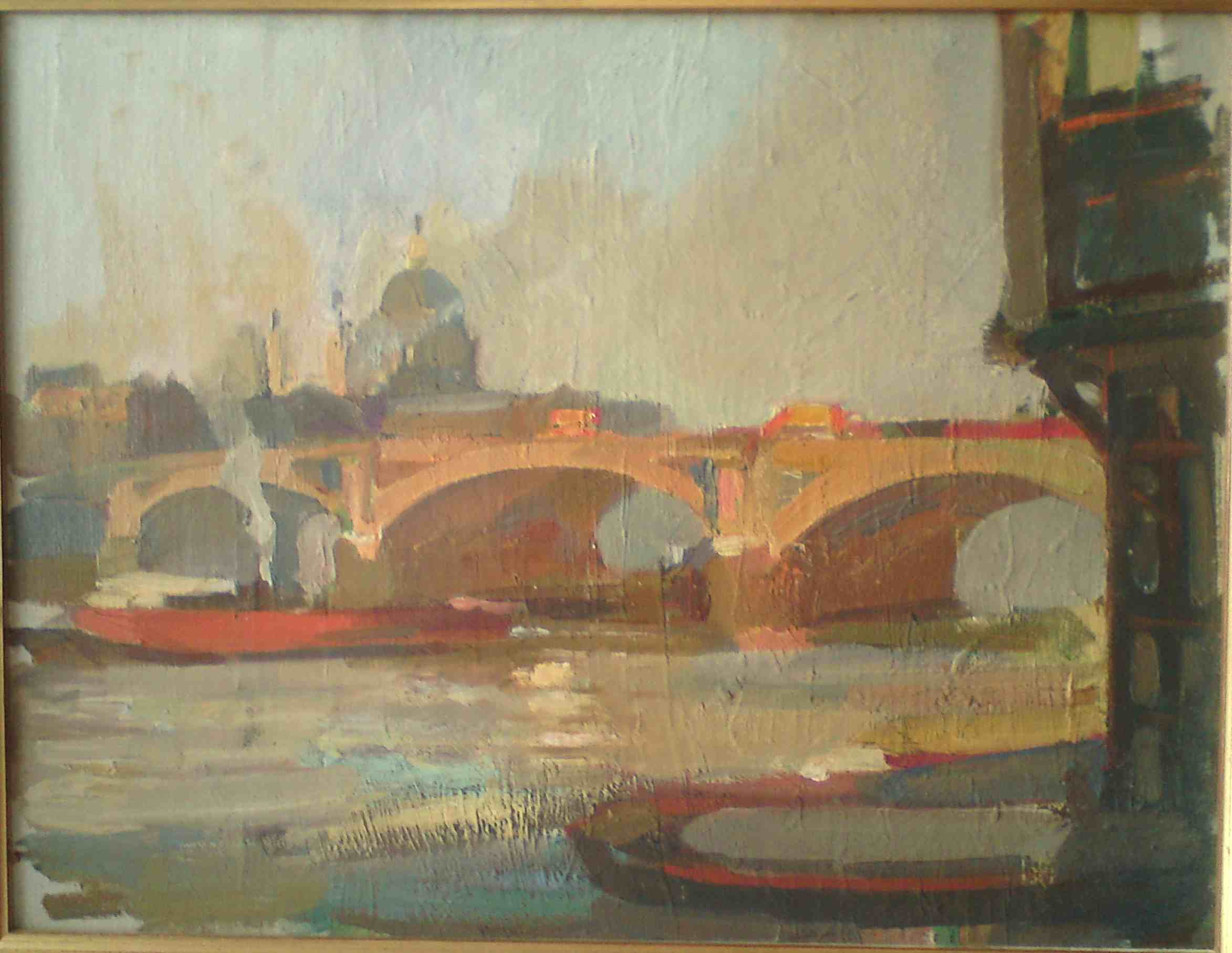
St Paul's Cathedral and Blackfriars Bridge, London, 1923, Oil

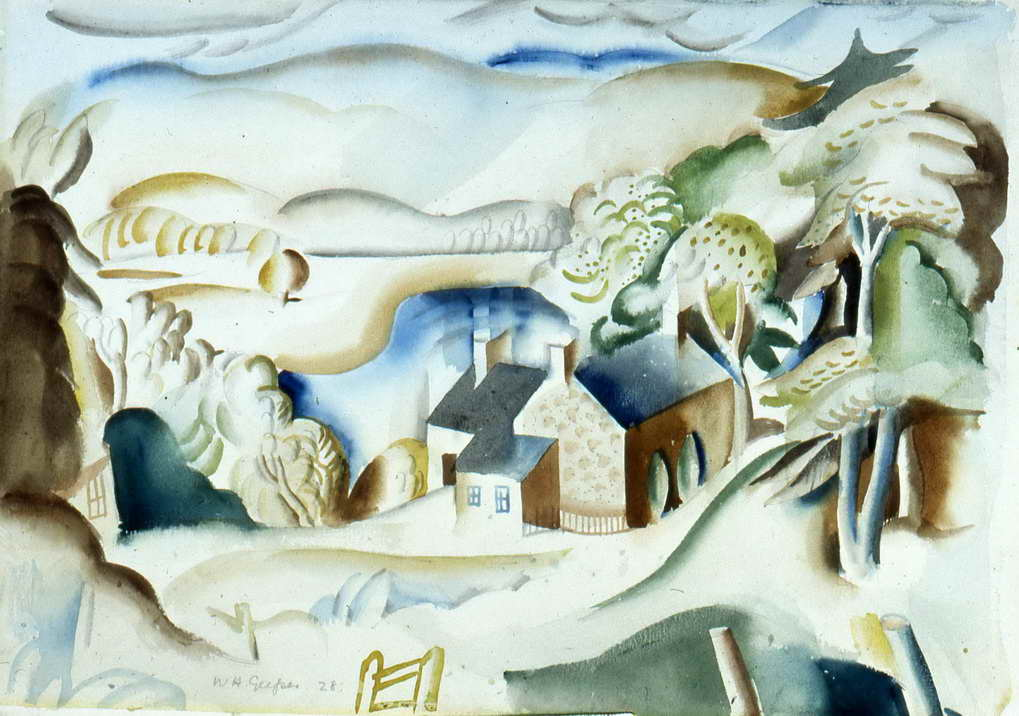
The Tay (Pitlochry), watercolour and pencil, 1928

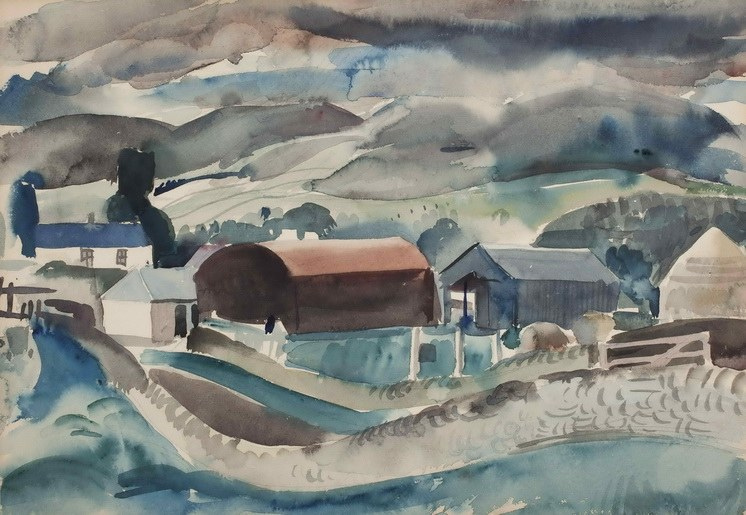
Near Moffat, ca. 1931 Watercolour and pencil (Courtesy of Perth Museum and Art Gallery)

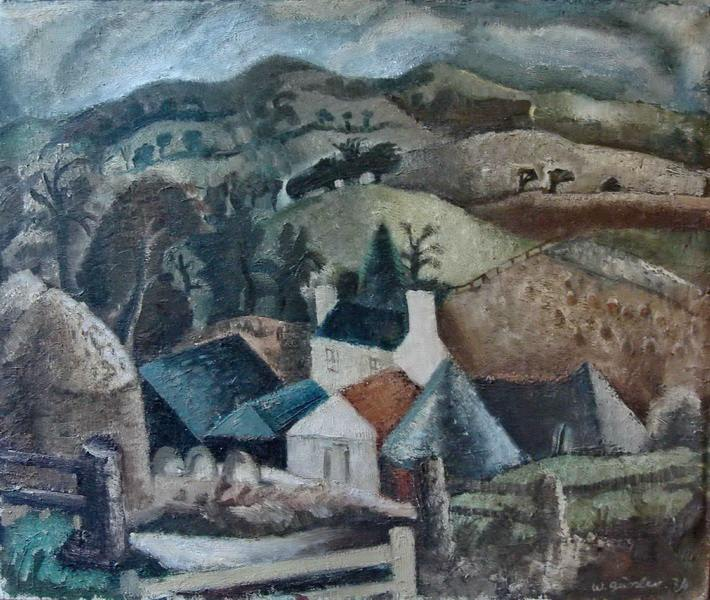
The Hill Farm (Wamphrey) 1930, Oil, Scottish National Gallery of Modern Art

He worked from close observation of nature, with scenes of lowland Scottish farms and farmsteads, of harbours with fishing boats, and of woodlands and trees. His landscapes are almost all without figures. His vision encompassed not only broad landscapes but was also enthralled by their finer details, as in Roots, Undergrowth, Toadstools, Dead Wood, Hemlock. As if plants and trees were the representation of life, some of his works at the end of the Second World War create a haunting, sinister mood, the expression of his desolation at the scene of a forest near Carrbridge felled by a storm. After 1951, however, vacations in the New Forest in Hampshire infused his paintings with bright colour and sun.

An MPhil thesis devoted to his work was completed by Norman Shaw in 1994, from which much of the information in this entry is drawn.

In the 1950s, he developed an interest in cinematography as a means of teaching art in schools. With the participation of teachers and school children from Norton Park School, he took an active part in the production of two films set in Edinburgh, The Singing Street and Happy Weekend.

A retrospective exhibition of his paintings entitled Poetry of Place was held at Edinburgh College of Art in 1996.

Several of his works have not been traced. References to some notable paintings not shown here are listed below, followed by a selection of some of his known works, arranged in approximate chronological order to show the development of his style and choice of subject matter during his career (see also):

- Moniaive, Watercolour, SSA exhibition 1934
- Highland Fling (SSA exhibition 1938)
- Toadstools, Watercolour with pen and ink (SSA exhibition 1943)
- The Monk's Walk (RSA exhibition 1944)
- Tree Stumps, Gouache, 1946
- Gateway, Watercolour on paper, 1947, RSW exhibition 1950
- Roots, Watercolour, gouache, pen and ink on paper, late 1940s
- Woodcuts, illustrations of books on plants

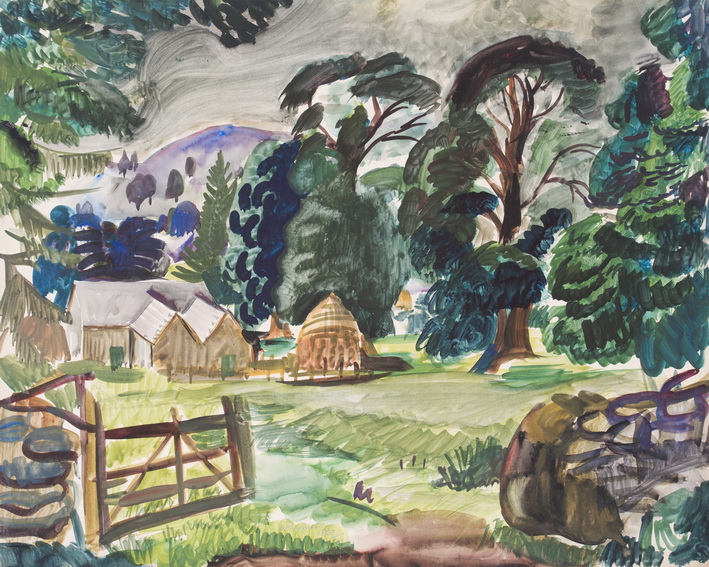
Perthshire Farm, Watercolour and Gouache, ca 1937

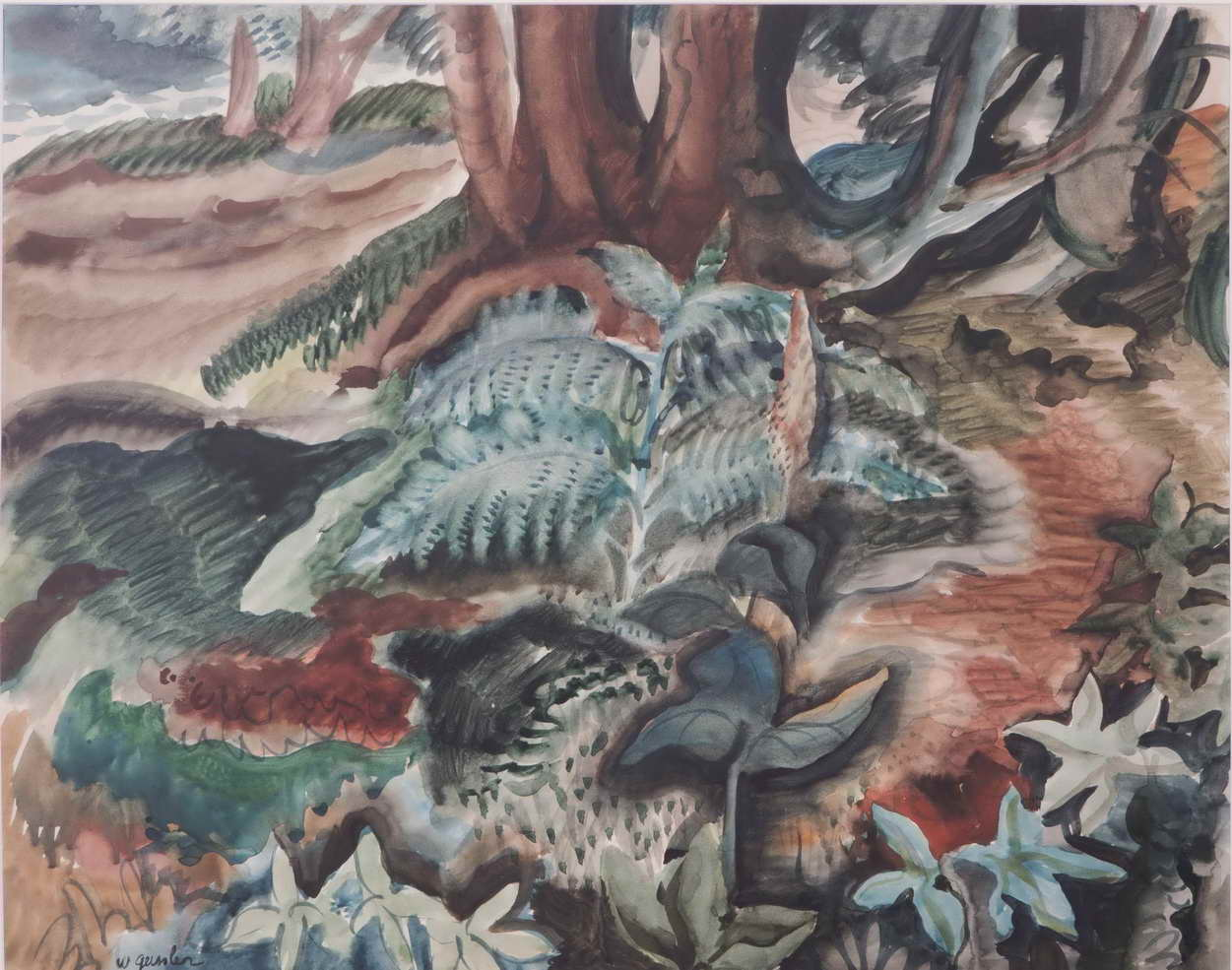
Undergrowth, Gouache, 1942

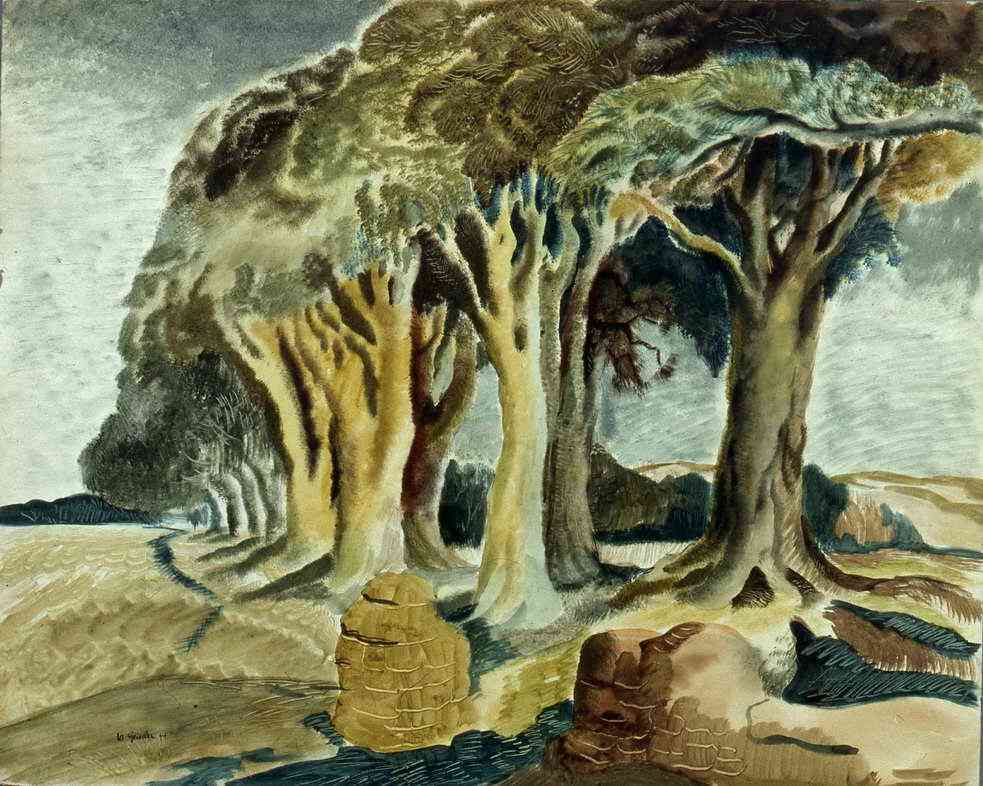
Procession of Trees, Gouache 1944

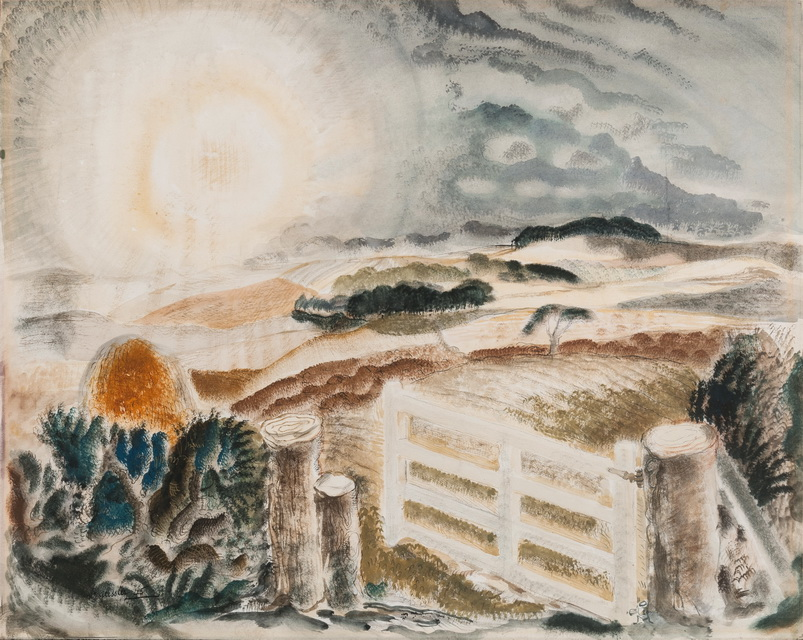
Morning Sun, Gouache with pen and ink, 1945

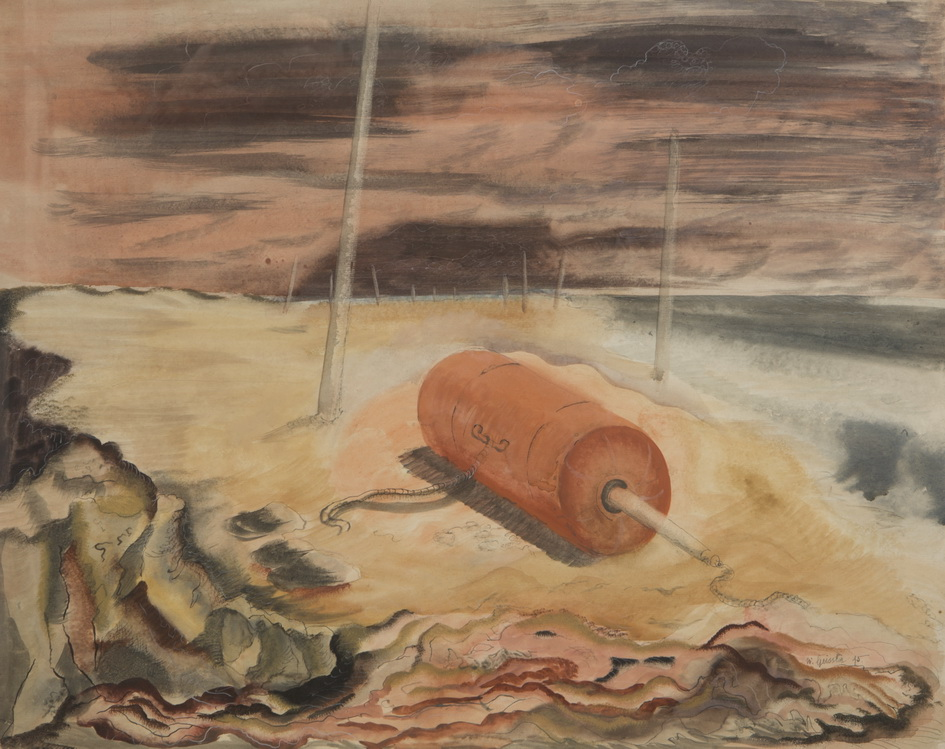
Wartime Beach. Gouache, pen and ink. 1945

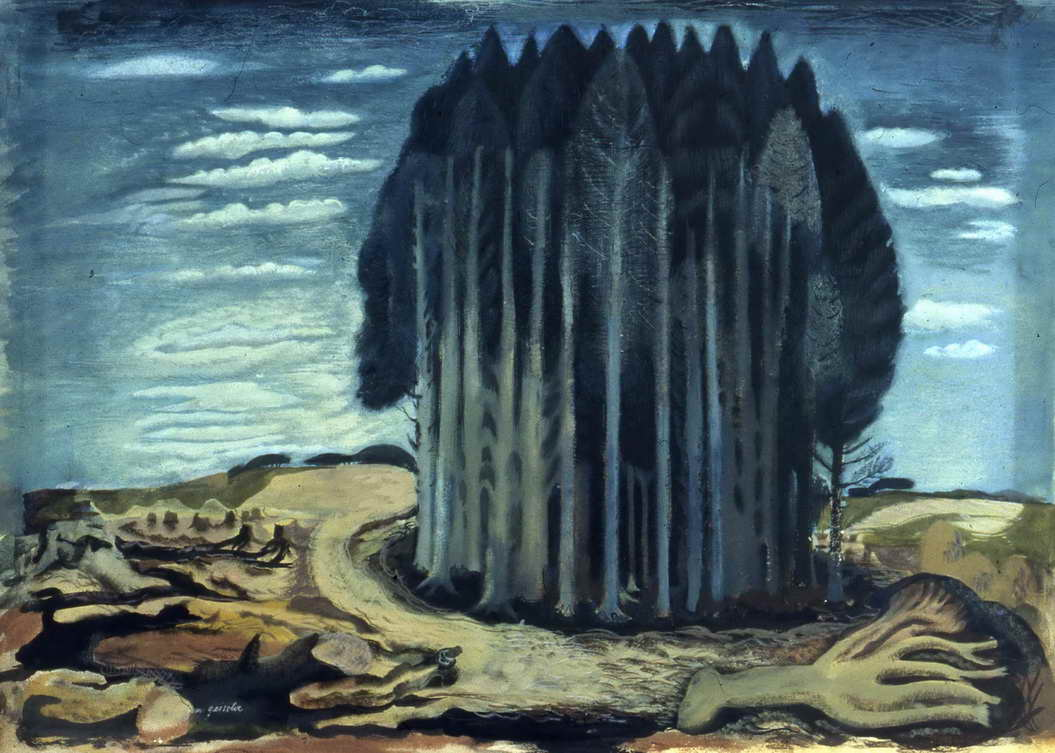
Awaiting Execution. Watercolour, 1946. Scottish National Gallery of Modern Art

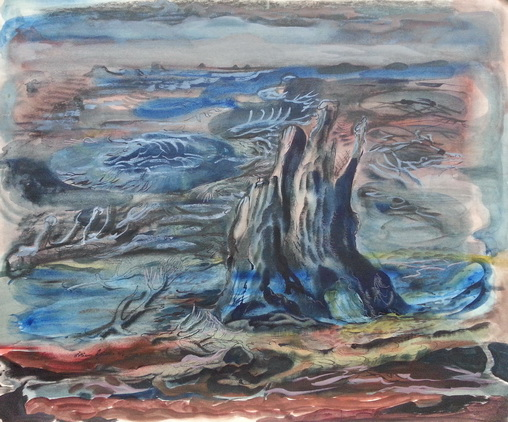
Tree Stump. Watercolour, gouache, pen and ink. 1946

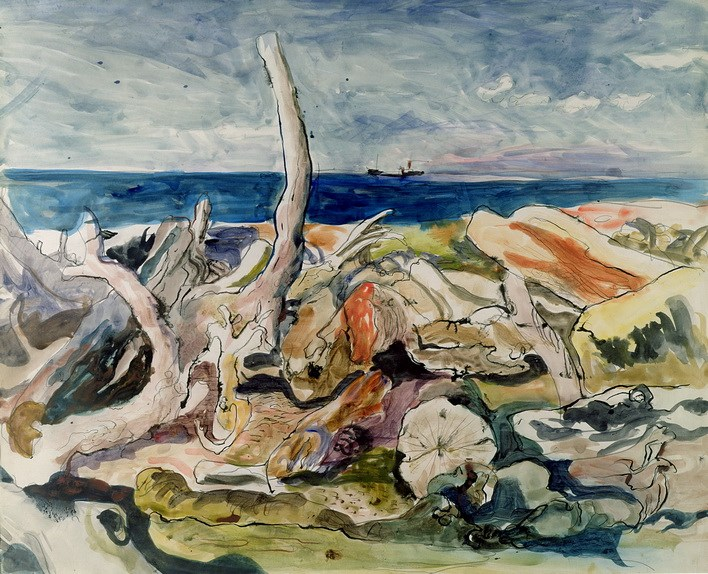
Flotsam and Jetsam, w/c pencil ink. ca 1945. The Fleming-Wyfold Art Foundation / Bridgeman Images

-->

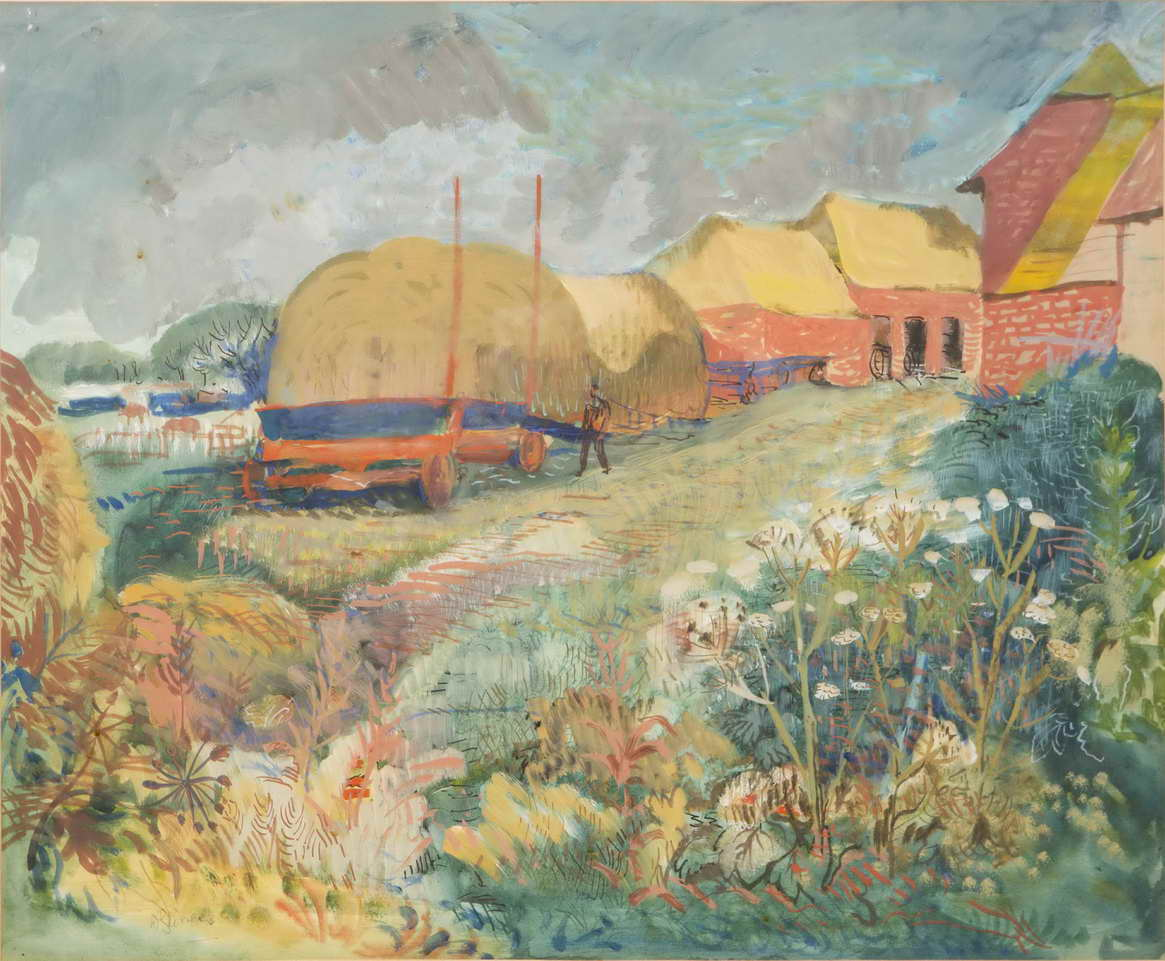
Bergerie Farm, Gouache, ca 1952

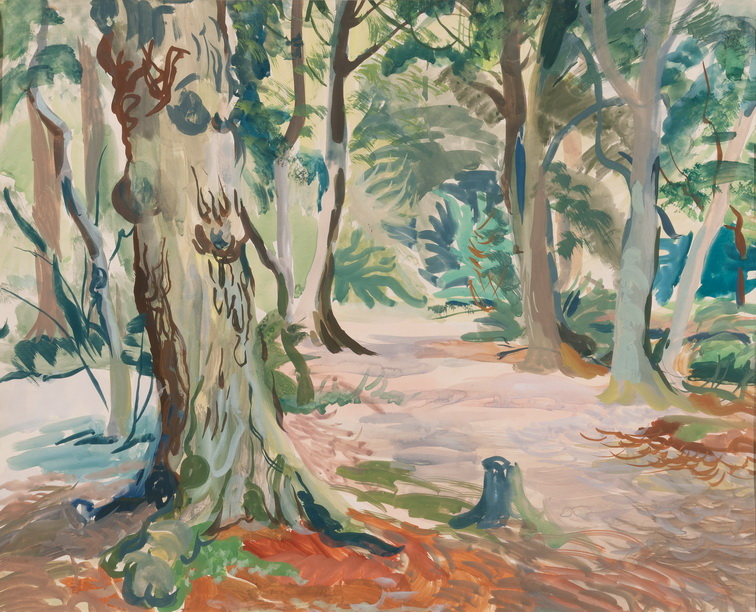
New Forest VIII. Hampshire. Gouache ca 1953

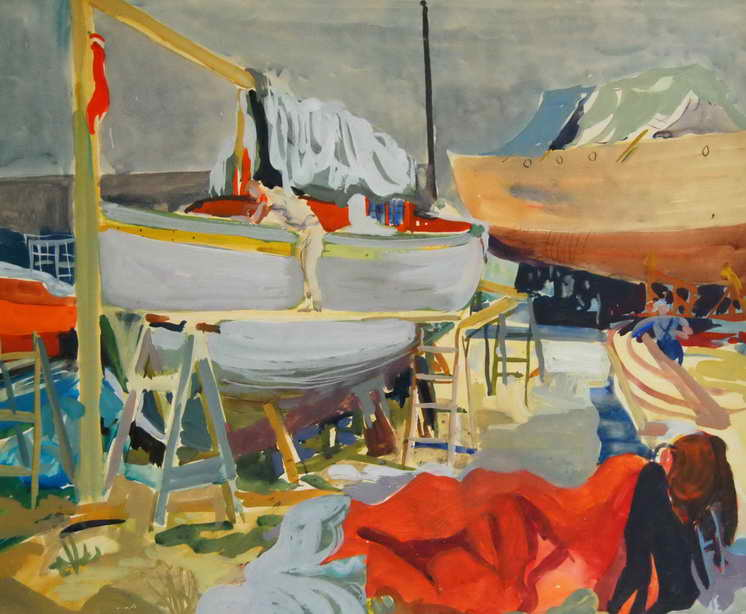
The Boatyard I, Gouache, Pen and Ink, ca. 1952

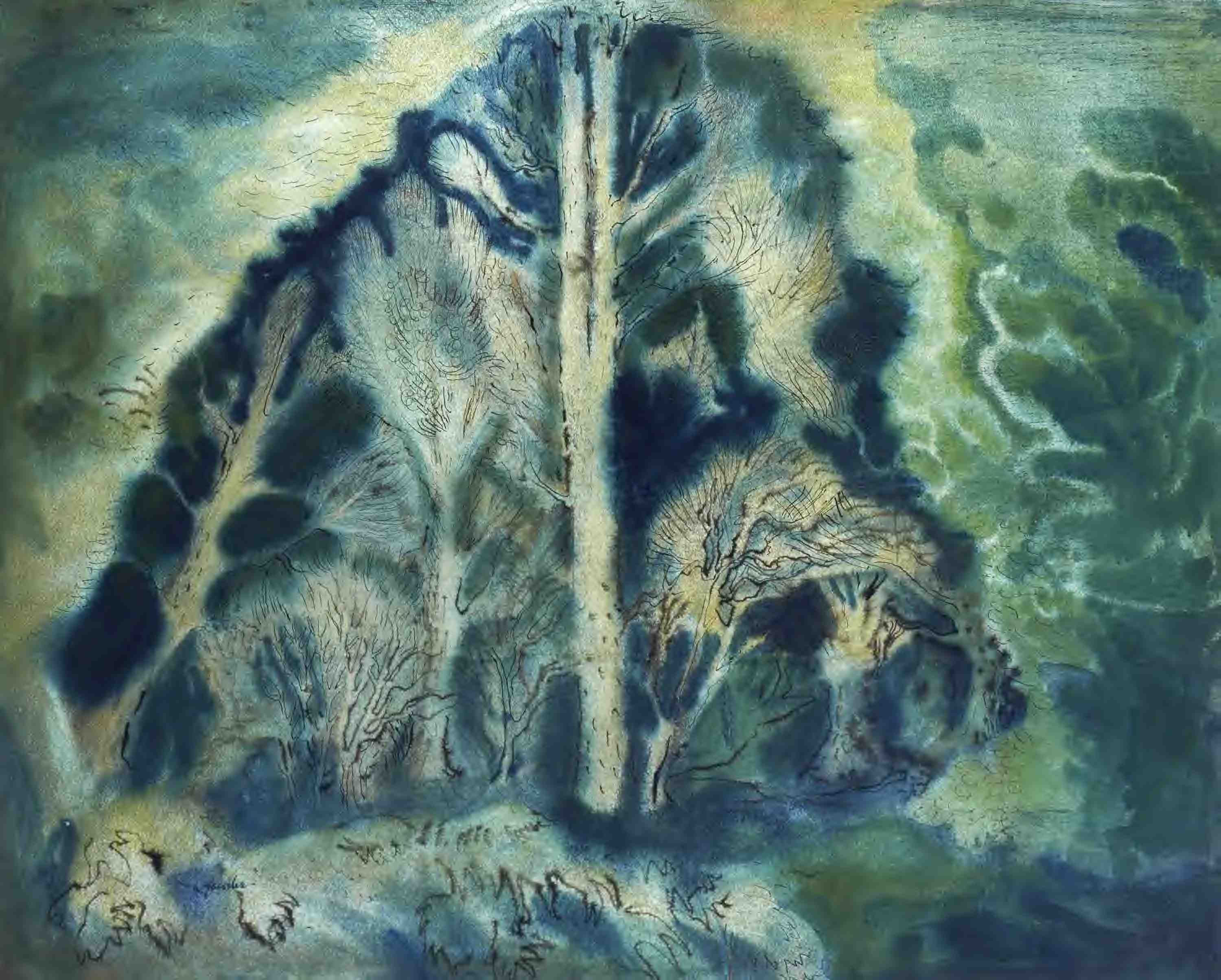
Dead Trees, Watercolour, ink 1954. Inverness Museum and Art Gallery

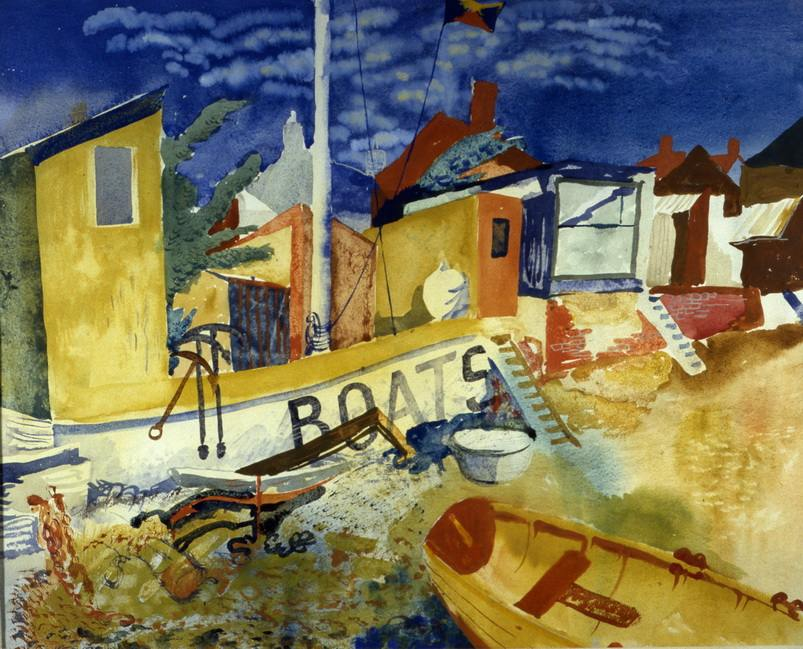
The Boat, Hythe. Watercolour 1954.

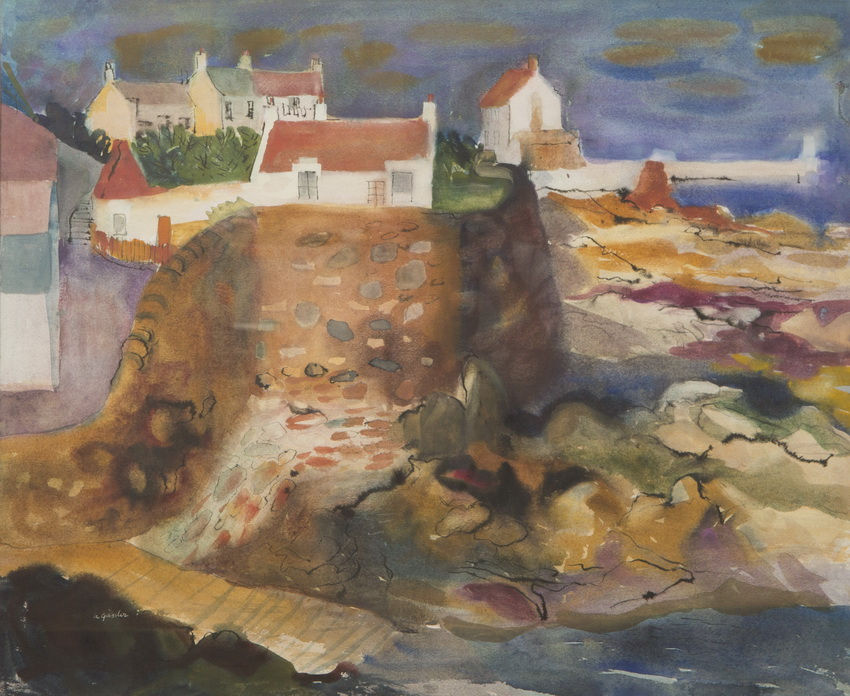
On the Fifeshire Coast (St Monans). Gouache ca 1954

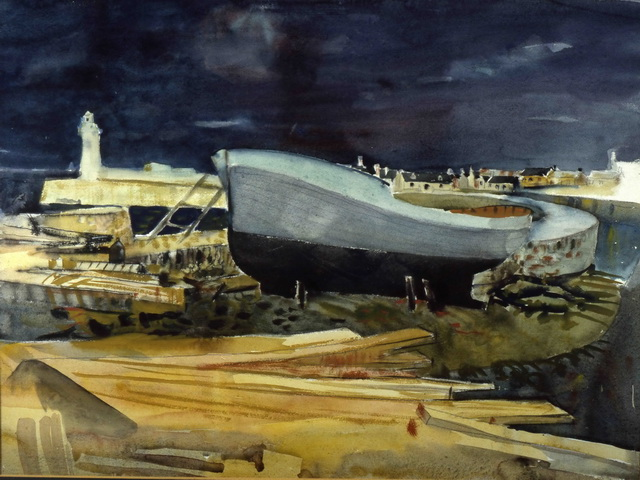
The Boat Yard (Macduff). Watercolour and pencil ca 1955

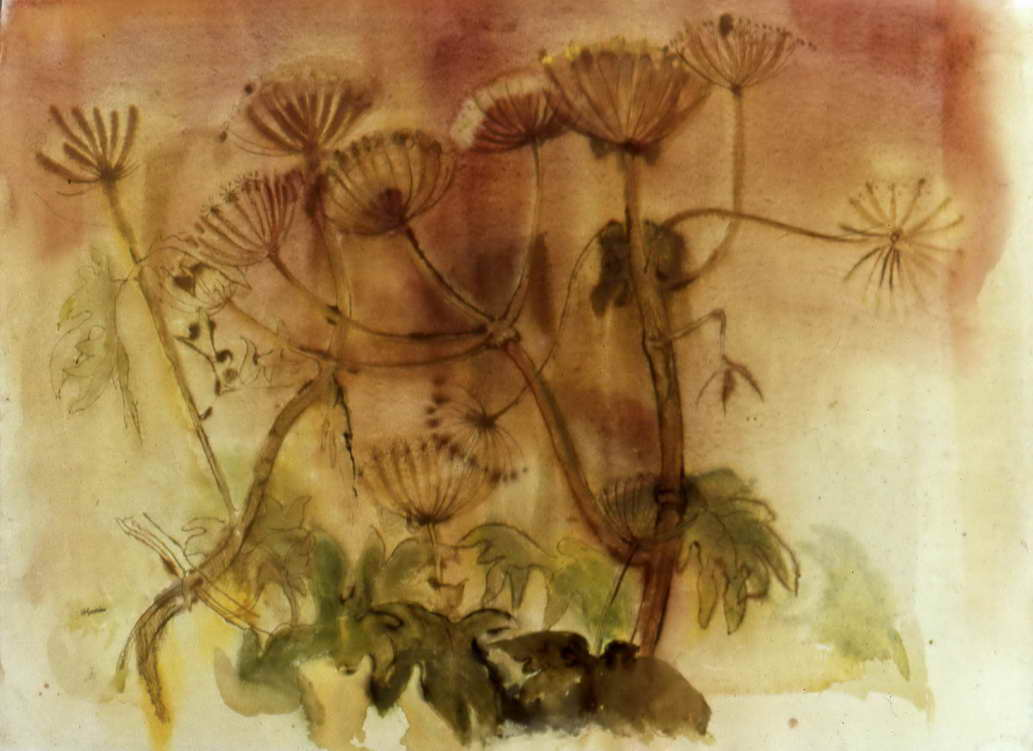
Hemlock, Watercolour with pen and ink 1956
