= Robin Philipson =

English-born painter

- Awards: Guthrie Award, 1951

Fighting Cocks, Grey, 1961, National Gallery of Scotland. One of Philipson's renowned series of cockfight paintings.

Cathedral, 1960, Royal Scottish Academy.

Sir Robert (Robin) James Philipson RA PPRSA FRSE RSW (17 December 1916 – 26 May 1992) was an English-born painter who was influential within the Scottish art scene for over three decades.

== Life ==
Philipson was born in 1916 in Broughton-in-Furness, Lancashire, the son of James Philipson. He was originally educated at Whitehaven Secondary School.

His family moved to Scotland when he was 14. He was then schooled at Dumfries Academy and then studied at Edinburgh College of Art from 1936 to 1940. On the outbreak of the Second World War, he joined the King's Own Scottish Borderers and was posted to India, seeing action in Burma. After the war, he returned to Edinburgh and became a lecturer at the College of Art in 1947, later taking the post of Head of the Drawing and Painting Department from 1960 to 1982.

Philipson's early work was mainly of landscapes, still lifes and interiors. He was strongly influenced by Gillies and Maxwell, with whom, amongst others, he shared membership of the group known as The Edinburgh School. He is particularly renowned for his cockfight paintings, a series begun in the early 1950s. His later work in the 1960s explored more general figurative studies plus church and cathedral interiors and crucifixions.

Philipson's 1960 painting, Cathedral was inspired by a visit to Amiens Cathedral in northern France. He explores the subject in a manner reminiscent of Monet's earlier studies of Rouen Cathedral, creating a sense of grandeur by expressing the verticality of the gothic architecture and by showing the patterns of coloured light coming from the stained-glass windows.

Philipson was well known for his bold use of colour and his liberal use of heavy impasto in his works. He was appointed as President of the Royal Scottish Academy in 1973, a position he held until 1983.

Philipson received four honorary doctorates: DUniv (from both Stirling and Heriot Watt); LLD (from Aberdeen); and Dlitt (from Glasgow). In 1977 he was elected a Fellow of the Royal Society of Edinburgh. His proposers were John Cameron, Lord Cameron, Alick Buchanan-Smith, Anthony Elliot Ritchie, R. Martin and S. Smellie.

He also received many honours during his career, including a knighthood in 1976 for his services to art in Scotland.

He died in Edinburgh on 26 May 1992.

== Family ==
He married three times: in 1949 to Brenda Mark (d.1960); in 1962 to Thora Clyne; and following divorce from Thora in 1975 married Diana Mary Pollock the following year.

== Solo exhibitions ==
- 1973/76/83~The Scottish Gallery, Edinburgh
- 1973~Roland Browse & Delbanco, London
- 1977~Retrospective Exhibition, McRobert Centre, Stirling University
- 1976/78~Loomshop Gallery, Lower Largo
- 1978~Browse & Darby Gallery, London
- 1979~Haddington House Festival Exhibition, Stirling Gallery
- 1980~Macaulay Gallery, Stenton
- 1994~Retrospective Exhibition, Browse & Darby Gallery, London and to Billcliffe Fine Art, Glasgow
- 1999~Retrospective Exhibition, Scottish National Gallery of Modern Art

== Locations of Philipson's Works ==
- Scottish National Gallery of Modern Art, Edinburgh
- Scottish Arts Council
- Royal Scottish Academy
- Aberdeen; Liverpool; Walker; Manchester; Whitworth; Glasgow; Perth; Cardiff;
- National Museum of Wales
- London Contemporary Art Society
- Fleming Wyfold Art Foundation, London
- Laing Art Gallery, Newcastle
- North Carolina Art Gallery and Museum
- Abrdn plc, Edinburgh
- Hutton-in-the-Forest, Penrith, Cumbria.
