= Perpetua Pope =

Scottish painter (1916–2013)

- Born: 29 May 1916; Solihull, England
- Died: May 31, 2013 (aged 97); Edinburgh, Scotland
- Education: Edinburgh College of Art
- Known for: Painting
- Movement: Edinburgh School

Perpetua (Pip) Pope (29 May 1916 – 31 May 2013) was a Scottish painter of landscapes, flower pieces and still-life compositions in both oil and watercolours, and was also an art teacher in Edinburgh.

== Life and work ==
Born in Solihull, England, to Scottish parents, Pope's family moved to rural Aberdeenshire when she was still a young child. Her father was a businessman and keen art collector, from whom she inherited a number of significant works such as one of Samuel Peploe's Iona paintings.

Pope attended Albyn School in Aberdeen, and then commenced study at Edinburgh College of Art in 1936. Her studies were interrupted by World War II, during which time she served with the Women's Auxiliary Air Force. In 1946 Pope resumed her studies at Edinburgh College of Art, then undertook teacher training at Moray House. Pope held several teaching posts in primary and private schools, including Lansdowne House in Edinburgh and the role of art mistress at Oxenfoord Castle School, Midlothian. Pope took up a post as art lecturer at Moray House in the mid-1960s, which she held until her early retirement in 1973.

Upon retirement from teaching, Pope concentrated on painting at her home, Weaver's Cottage in Carlops. She is linked to The Edinburgh School of artists, having studied under Sir William Gilles at Edinburgh College of Art and formed friendships with fellow artists such as Joan Eardley. Like many artists of the Edinburgh School, Pope worked in both oil and watercolour. She primarily painted still life and landscapes. Her work was heavily inspired by the Aberdeenshire landscapes of her youth, but she also traveled frequently both within Scotland and Europe, notably Cyprus, Lebanon, the Peloponnese and Spain, looking for inspiration. Pope exhibited at the Royal Academy, with the Royal Scottish Academy and had a series of solo shows at The Scottish Gallery between 1956 and 1982 and then at the Macaulay Gallery.

Explaining her intentions in painting the Scottish landscape, Pope said in 2008,

I have tried to paint the intense pleasure I get from being in the Highlands and Islands of Scotland. I don't want to paint views particularly, it's more the feeling of freedom - the changing light, the subtle colour of the countryside, the sand blown by the wind, the wild flowers, the machair and the sand dunes and always the feeling of space and air.

— Perpetua Pope

== Selected exhibitions ==
1942 RSA Annual Exhibition

1949 Exhibition of women artists, Church of Scotland Art Centre, Edinburgh

1956 The Scottish Gallery, Edinburgh

1965 The Scottish Gallery, Edinburgh

1971 25th Anniversary Exhibition, Edinburgh College of Art

1975 The Scottish Gallery, Edinburgh

1978 The Scottish Gallery, Edinburgh

1979 The Loomshop Gallery, Lower Largo

1980 Peter Potter Gallery, Haddington

1982 The Scottish Gallery, Edinburgh

1983 Macaulay Gallery, East Lothian

1984 Broughton Gallery, Scottish Borders

1986 The Open Eye Gallery, Edinburgh

1990 Macaulay Gallery, East Lothian

1992 Macaulay Gallery, East Lothian

1998 Stenton Gallery, East Lothian

2006 The Scottish Gallery, Edinburgh

2011 The Scottish Gallery, Edinburgh
