= Emma Smith Gillies =

Scottish potter

Emma Smith Gillies (1900–1936) was a Scottish potter best known for her early adaptation of Art Deco painted vases and jugs.

== Pottery ==
Emma Gillies was born in the small town of Haddington, outside the city of Edinburgh in Scotland. In Haddington, Gillies joined the Scottish Women’s Rural Institutes (SWRI) in the early 1920s and was taught by Catherine Blair, a founder of the Institute, how to decorate blanks in the Mak’Merry Pottery style. Shortly thereafter, her talents led her to teach classes in the decoration of blanks to new members of the SWRI with Betty Wright, a founding member of the Mak’Merry Pottery collective

In 1929, Gillies moved to Edinburgh where she began to attend pottery classes in the Sculpture Department of Edinburgh College of Art, the only program which offered Pottery Classes at the College. There she studied under the tutelage of renowned sculptor and Head of School Alexander Carrick until her graduation in 1932 where, in her last semester, she took part in an Exhibition of Metalwork and Pottery "at 5 Ramsay Lane [in] Edinburgh" published in the Edinburgh newspaper The Scotsman on 3 December of that year. Not a week later, the same publication announced that Gillies had been awarded a one-hundred pound Travelling Scholarship to the London Royal College of Art.

The following academic semester, Emma Gillies attended the Royal College of Art in London under William Staite Murray, one of the foremost Scottish potters of the 20th century. However, Gillies was unable to finish her studies in London due to poor health which forced her to return home after completing only a year. Despite her illness, Gillies was exhibited in the prestigious Art Exhibition of the Society of Scottish Artists in October 1935 to critical acclaim before her death at the age of thirty-six in March 1936.

After her death, her older brother and famous Scottish landscape and still-life painter William George Gillies painted many of her works as still lifes to memorialise her through his own work. In 2012, several of her art works were discovered at Edinburgh College of Art. There have been two exhibitions which showed her work posthumously.

== Readings ==
- Orton-Hatzis, Anna. "Emma Gillies: Rediscovered", Scottish Pottery Society Annual Review, May 2015.
- Soden, Joanna. Emma Gillies: Potter and Muse, Royal Scottish Academy, February 2006.

== Exhibitions ==
- Exhibition of Metalwork and Pottery, Edinburgh, December 1932
- Art Exhibition of the Scottish Society of Artists, Edinburgh, October 1935
- Potter and Muse, RSA Library Exhibition, Royal Scottish Academy, Edinburgh, April 2006 – 30 July 2006
- Emma Gillies Rediscovered, University of Edinburgh Library, Edinburgh, December 2014 – March 2015
