= Elizabeth Blackadder =

Scottish painter and printmaker (1931–2021)

Dame Elizabeth Blackadder DBE RA RSA HonRWA
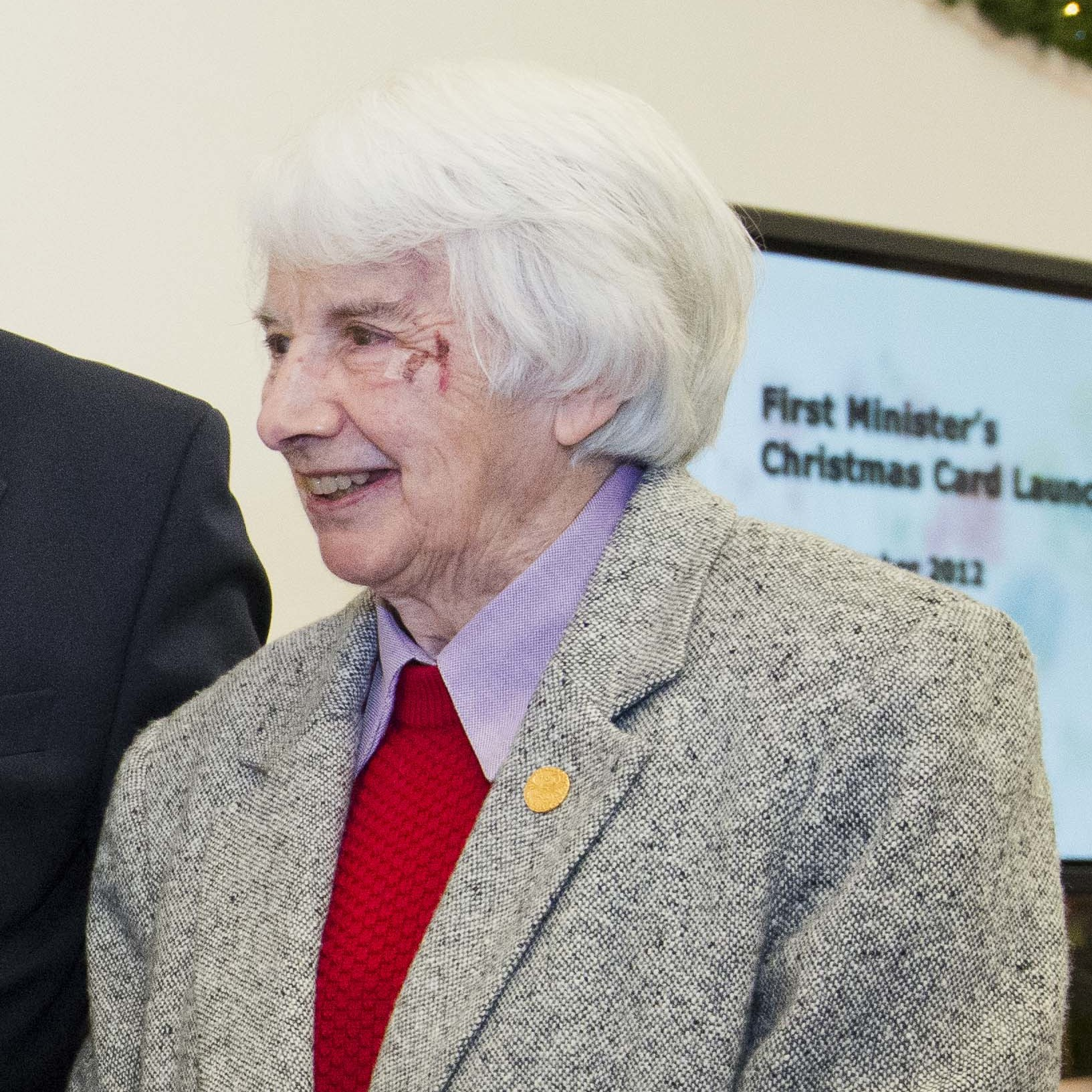
- Blackadder in 2012
- Born: Elizabeth Violet Blackadder; 24 September 1931; Falkirk, Scotland
- Died: 23 August 2021 (aged 89); Edinburgh, Scotland
- Education: Edinburgh College of Art (1949–54)
- Known for: Painting; printmaking
- Spouse: John Houston (m. 1956; died 2008)
- Awards: Guthrie Award, RSA (1962); Pimms Award, RA (1983); Watercolour Foundation Award, (1988)
- Elected: RSW (1960); ARA (22 April 1971); RA (29 April 1976); RSA (1972); RGI (1983); HonRWA; HonRWS; HonRE; HonFRIAS; HonRSE
- Website: Elizabeth Blackadder – Art UK

Dame Elizabeth Violet Blackadder, Mrs Houston, DBE, RA, RSA, HonRWA (24 September 1931 – 23 August 2021) was a Scottish painter and printmaker. She was the first woman to be elected to both the Royal Scottish Academy and the Royal Academy of Arts.

In 1962, she began teaching at Edinburgh College of Art where she continued until her retirement in 1986. Blackadder worked in a variety of media such as oil paints, watercolour, drawing, and printmaking. In her still life paintings and drawings, she considered space between objects carefully. She also painted portraits and landscapes, but her later work contains mainly her cats and flowers rendered in great detail. Her work can be seen at the Tate Gallery, the Scottish National Gallery of Modern Art, and the Museum of Modern Art in New York, and has appeared on a series of Royal Mail stamps.

In 2012, Blackadder was selected to paint Scottish First Minister Alex Salmond's official Christmas card.

== Early years ==
Blackadder was born and raised at 7 Weir Street, Falkirk, the third child of Thomas and Violet Isabella Blackadder. Violet Blackadder ensured Elizabeth benefited from a series of promising educational opportunities and, determined to spare her daughter the struggles she had been through, convinced her own father to support Elizabeth's training as a domestic science teacher. Blackadder's father died when she was 10. Her mother died, aged 89, in 1984.

She spent a substantial part of her childhood alone, due in part to a keen appetite for reading. During her teenage years Blackadder began meticulously collecting local flowers, compiling the specimens by pressing and labelling them with their full Latin names, a fascination that was to surface much later in her paintings of plants and flowers.

== Education ==
A former pupil of Falkirk High School, she donated one of her paintings to the school on the occasion of its centenary in 1986. She later remembered the pleasure she derived from her art classes in particular, but also enjoying dissecting and drawing plants as part of her botanical studies; she spent the majority of her sixth year in the school's art room. She arrived in Edinburgh in September 1949 to start on the newly approved Fine Art degree and graduated with first class honours in 1954. Blackadder studied early Byzantine art while at university, and one of the most enduring influences on her work was her tutor and prolific painter William Gillies. Blackadder spent the fourth and fifth years of her MA course concentrating on her imminent examinations; it was during this period that she met Scottish artist John Houston who was later to become her husband.

The fifth and final year of Blackadder's Fine Art degree was spent at Edinburgh College of Art, where she researched throughout the year for her dissertation on William MacTaggart. She graduated in 1954 with a first-class degree and was awarded both a Carnegie travelling scholarship by the Royal Scottish Academy and an Andrew Grant Postgraduate Scholarship by Edinburgh College of Art.

== Career ==
Flowers on an Indian Cloth

In 1954, Blackadder put the money from her Carnegie scholarship towards spending three months travelling through Yugoslavia, Greece, and Italy, where she focused on classical and Byzantine art. In 1962 her painting, White Still Life, Easter was given the Guthrie Award for best work by a young artist at the Royal Scottish Academy.
During the 1960s she developed her interests in still life while continuing with her love of landscape by painting landscapes in France, Spain, Portugal, and Scotland, and acquired a growing reputation for her paintings of flowers, Flowers on an Indian Cloth being a notable example. During her travels to France she became more aware of the artist Henri Matisse, and under his influence she lightened her palette.

In the 1980s, she visited Japan on a number of occasions and many of her paintings at the time showed the influence of these trips. First visiting in 1985, and returning the following year, Blackadder's interest in Eastern techniques and subject matter was realised in a series of vibrant oils and watercolours shown at the Mercury Gallery in 1991. Her desire to avoid the technical vibrancy of Tokyo took Blackadder to the Zen gardens of Kyoto; in many ways, her work depicts the principles of Zen which give paramount importance to the idea of empty space. She traveled to the United States of America. Souvenirs of her travels would appear in many of her paintings.

Blackadder began working at Glasgow Print Studio in 1985, after being invited to make prints there. She worked with master printmakers from that time until around 2014, working predominantly to produce etchings and screenprints with some lithographs and woodcuts. Her subject matter was dominated by cats and flowers but also included images from travels in Europe and Japan.

== Honours ==
=== Appointed ===
Blackadder was the first woman to be an academician of both the Royal Academy of Arts in London and the Royal Scottish Academy; in the 1982 Birthday Honours she was appointed an OBE for her contribution to art she was promoted to a DBE in 2003.

In 2001, she was appointed Her Majesty's Painter and Limner in Scotland.

=== Elected ===
- Royal Academy of Arts
- Royal Scottish Academy
- Royal Scottish Society of Painters in Watercolour
- Royal Glasgow Institute of the Fine Arts

=== Honorary degrees ===
- Heriot-Watt University (DLitt, July 1989)
- University of Strathclyde (DLitt, July 1998)
- University of Glasgow (DLitt, October 2001)
- University of Stirling (Doctor of the University, 27 June 2002)
- University of St Andrews (DLitt, 26 June 2003)

=== Honorary fellowships & memberships ===
- Royal West of England Academy
- Royal Watercolour Society
- Royal Society of Painter-Printmakers
- Royal Incorporation of Architects in Scotland
- Royal Society of Edinburgh

== Family ==
In 1956 she married painter John Houston. The couple took up residence in a large villa in The Grange district of Edinburgh, which she continued to occupy until her death in 2021. She was widowed in 2008.

== Death ==
Dame Elizabeth Blackadder died on 23 August 2021, aged 89.

== Exhibitions ==
=== Solo exhibitions ===
- 57 Gallery, Edinburgh, 1959
- The Scottish Gallery, Aitken Dott, Edinburgh, 1961
- Mercury Gallery, London, 1965
- The Scottish Gallery, Aitken Dott, Edinburgh 1966
- Thames Gallery, Eton, 1966
- Mercury Gallery, London, 1967
- Reading Art Gallery and Museum, 1968
- Lane Art Gallery, Bradford, 1968
- New Paintings, Mercury Gallery, London, 14 October 1969 – 8 November 1969
- Vaccarino Gallery, Florence, 1970
- Scottish Arts Council Retrospective Touring Exhibition; Edinburgh, Sheffield, Aberdeen, Liverpool, Cardiff, London, 1981–82
- Theo Waddington Gallery, Toronto, Canada, 1982
- New Paintings, Mercury Gallery, London, 14 October 1988 – 19 November 1988
- Elizabeth Blackadder, Aberystwth Arts Centre, 8 April 1989 – 20 May 1989, the Gardener Centre, Brighton, 3 June 1989 – 8 July 1989, Oriel Bangor Art Gallery, 15 July 1989 – 19 August 1989
- New Oils and Watercolours, Mercury Gallery, London, 22 May 1991 – 22 June 1991
- New Work, Oils and Watercolours, Mercury Gallery, London, 22 September 1993 – 23 October 1993
- New Oils and Watercolours, Mercury Gallery, London, 16 October 1996 – 16 November 1996
- Elizabeth Blackadder, Mercury Gallery, London, 20 October 1999 – 20 November 1999
- Paintings, Prints and Watercolours 1955-2000, Talbot Rice Gallery, Edinburgh 28 July 2000 – 15 September 2000

=== Selected group exhibitions ===
- Contemporary Scottish Painting, Toronto, Canada, 1961
- Fourteen Scottish Painters, Commonwealth Institute, London, 1963-1964
- Three Centuries of Scottish Painting, National Gallery of Canada, Ottawa, 1968
- The Edinburgh School, Edinburgh College of Art, 1971
- Edinburgh Ten 30, Scottish Arts Council Exhibition touring Wales, 1975
- British Paintings 1952-1977, Royal Academy, London, 1977
- Painters in Parallel, Scottish Arts Council, Edinburgh College of Art, 1978
- Scottish Paintings and Tapestries, Offenburg, West Germany, 1979
- The British Art Show, Arts Council of Great Britain touring exhibition, 1980
- Master Weavers, Dovecot Studios' Tapestries, Scottish Arts Council, Edinburgh, 1980
- Six Scottish Painters, Graham Gallery, New York, 1982
- Portraits on Paper, Scottish Arts Council, 1984
- One of a Kind, Glasgow Print Studio, 1985
- Still-Life, Harris Museum, Preston, 1985
- Scottish Landscapes, National Gallery of Brazil, Rio de Janeiro, 1986
- The Flower Show, Stoke-on-Trent Art Gallery, touring show, 1986
- Flowers of Scotland, Fine Art Society, Glasgow
- Scottish Art Since 1900, Scottish National Gallery of Modern Art
- Images of Paradise, Rainforest Fund, 1988
- Within These Shores, a selection of works from the Chantrey Bequest, Graves Art Gallery, Sheffield, 1989
- Scottish Monotypes, Glasgow, Print Studio
- Salute to Turner, National Trust, London, 1990
- Brush to Paper, 3 Centuries of British Watercolours, Aberdeen Art Gallery touring exhibition, 1991
- Writing on the Wall, Tate Gallery, London, 1993
- The Line of Tradition, National Gallery of Scotland, 1993
- Celebration, Hunterian Art Gallery, University of Glasgow, 1999
- Liberation and Tradition, Scottish Art 1963-1975, Aberdeen Art Gallery, McManus Gallery, Dundee, 1999

== Collections ==
- Heriot-Watt University
- Hunterian Museum and Art Gallery
