= The Edinburgh School =

20th-century artistic group

The Edinburgh School is a group of 20th century artists connected with Edinburgh. They share a connection through Edinburgh College of Art, where most studied and worked together during or soon after the First World War. As friends and colleagues, they discussed painting and were influenced by one another's work. They were bound together as members of Edinburgh-based exhibition bodies: the Royal Scottish Academy (RSA), Society of Scottish Artists (SSA) and the Royal Scottish Society of Painters in Watercolour (RSW). They predominantly painted still life and Scottish landscapes, and shared an interest in working both in oil and watercolour.

Art critic Giles Sutherland, writing in The Times, has suggested: "The work of the Edinburgh School is characterised by virtuoso displays in the use of paint, vivid and often non-naturalistic colour and themes such as still-life, seascape and landscape."

The following are generally thought of as Edinburgh School painters.

- William Crozier (1893–1930)
- William Geissler (1894–1963)
- Sir William Gillies (1898–1973)
- Sir William MacTaggart (1903–1981)
- John Maxwell (1905–1962)
- Sir Robin Philipson (1916–1992)
- Perpetua Pope (1916-2013)
- Anne Redpath (1895–1965)
- Adam Bruce Thomson (1885–1976)

Some other painters associated with Edinburgh may also be called Edinburgh School artists, or a 'new generation' of the Edinburgh School.

== Notes ==
The 'Edinburgh School' refers to a group of artists whose work shares certain characteristics and is not the same as the 'Edinburgh School of Art'. This latter name is quite often used for the college even though it has been officially called Edinburgh College of Art since 1907.

== See also ==
- Macmillan, Duncan Scottish Art in the 20th Century 1890–2001 (2001)
- Anne Redpath and the Edinburgh School
