= William Staite Murray =

English studio potter (1881–1962)

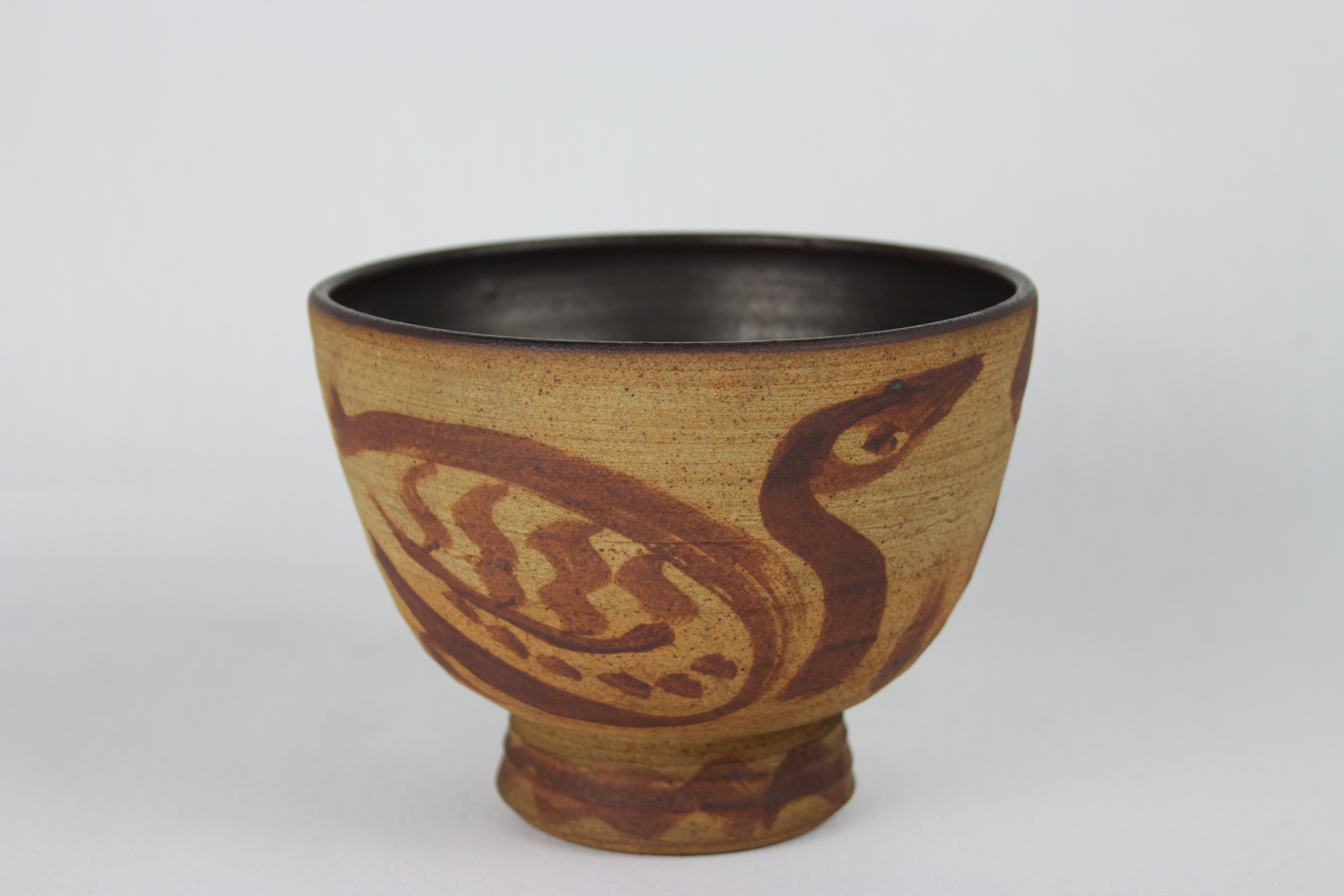
Thrown Bowl by William Staite Murray

William Staite Murray (1881–1962) was an English studio potter.

== Biography ==
He was born in Deptford, London and attended pottery classes at Camberwell School of Arts and Crafts from 1909 - 1912. He worked with Cuthbert Hamilton, a member of the Vorticist group, at the Yeoman Pottery in Kensington before joining the army in 1915. In 1919, after his military service, he set up his own pottery in Rotherhithe, London in the premises of his brother's engineering and foundry works. Although initially influenced by the avant-garde art of the time he became increasingly interested in early Chinese ceramics, under the influence of which he began making high-fired stoneware in an oil-fired kiln. From Rotherhithe he moved his studio first to Brockley in Kent and then to in 1929 to Bray, Berkshire.

He rejected any need for functionality in his work, regarding his pots as pure art and giving them individual titles. In this respect, he was at variance with Bernard Leach and his followers, for whom functionality was a key tenet. Murray's aim was to raise the profile and reputation of pottery to a level where it would be regarded as equal to painting and sculpture. He was a member of the Seven and Five group of painters and sculptors, and held exhibitions jointly with the painters Ben and Winifred Nicholson and Christopher Wood. He was also a member of the Red Rose Guild.

He was made instructor in pottery at the Royal College of Art in London in 1926 and became an influential teacher in the 1930s, his pupils including Henry Hammond, Sam Haile, Robert J Washington, and Emma Smith Gillies. In 1940 he went on a three-month visit to Southern Rhodesia (now Zimbabwe) and decided to settle, in part because of the war. He gave up making pottery and died twenty years later although he had a final exhibition in London towards the end of his life.

In Rhodesia he was appointed Trustee of National Arts Council.

== See also ==
- Studio pottery
