= Duncan Shanks =

Scottish painter (born 1937)

Duncan Shanks (born 1937) RSA, RSW, RGI, is a Lanarkshire born painter best known for work made around his home in Carluke, Scotland.

== Biography ==
He studied at The Glasgow School of Art in the 1950s under David Donaldson and was awarded a post-diploma travel scholarship which took him to Italy for a year. Upon his return to Scotland in 1961 he took up a teaching position at GSA, lecturing there part time until 1979.

Duncan Shanks's first solo exhibition was hosted by Stirling University in 1974. Since then he has exhibited regularly in solo and group exhibitions, represented by Roger Billcliffe Fine Art in Glasgow and The Scottish Gallery in Edinburgh. The Scottish Gallery has held 11 exhibitions with Duncan Shanks between 1981 and 2019. His most recent show, Transience, received a four star review from Duncan Macmillan in The Scotsman. He wrote "For Shanks, it is the restlessness, the constant change even in the most familiar things (the transience indeed as life flows by like the River Clyde past the bottom of his garden) that it has been his mission to try to convey."

Shanks's work is also held in numerous public and private collections, including The University of St Andrews, Arts Council Collection, Southbank Centre and the Fleming-Wyfold Art Foundation. The Hunterian Museum and Art Gallery in Glasgow holds a collection of over 100 sketchbooks. Curator Anne Delau Beveridge explained their value to the collection when she wrote: "Duncan’s sketchbooks were never intended to be seen by others. As such they offer an uncensored insight into the artist’s working process, thoughts and aspirations. Ideas first explored in these sketchbooks were often subsequently developed in studio studies."
