= William MacTaggart =

Scottish painter (1903–1981)

Duet, 1958, Tate Gallery. Two flower studies, painted on separate pieces of millboard and joined together to make a single painting.

Sir William MacTaggart, FRSE RA PPRSA (1903–1981) was a Scottish painter known for his landscapes of East Lothian, France, Norway and elsewhere. He is sometimes called William MacTaggart the Younger to distinguish him from his grandfather, the painter William McTaggart.

== Life and work ==
William MacTaggart was born on 15 May 1903 at Westbank in Loanhead, Midlothian, the son of Hugh Holmes MacTaggart an engineer and partner of MacTaggart Scott & Co.

He went to Edinburgh College of Art between 1918 and 1921, and there he made friends with other young artists like William Gillies, William Geissler, Anne Redpath, John Maxwell, William Crozier and Adam Bruce Thomson. Later they would be considered the core group of the Edinburgh School. Crozier was a major artistic influence on MacTaggart, and he joined his friend on some of his trips to the south of France, made for the sake of MacTaggart's health, as well as for painting opportunities.

In 1927 he joined the Society of Eight whose members included Cadell and Peploe, and two years later held his first solo exhibition. In the early 1930s he shared a studio with Gillies.

MacTaggart started teaching at Edinburgh College of Art in 1933 and was president of the Society of Scottish Artists between 1933 and 1936. In 1948 the Royal Scottish Academy made him an Academician and he later served as their president from 1959 to 1969. He was also a member of the Royal Academy in London and was knighted in 1962.

In 1967 he was elected a Fellow of the Royal Society of Edinburgh. His proposers were Harold R. Fletcher, Stanley Cursiter, Norman Feather and Neil Campbell.

He died on 9 January 1981.

== Family ==
In 1937 he married Fanny Margaretha Basilier Aavatsmark, a Norwegian.

== Bibliography ==
- Macmillan, Duncan Scottish Art in the 20th Century (2001)
- Oxford Dictionary of National Biography
