= William Crozier (Scottish artist) =

Scottish painter (1893–1930)

- Born: 20 June 1893; Edinburgh, Scotland
- Died: 19 December 1930 (aged 37); Edinburgh Royal Infirmary
- Awards: Guthrie Award, 1928

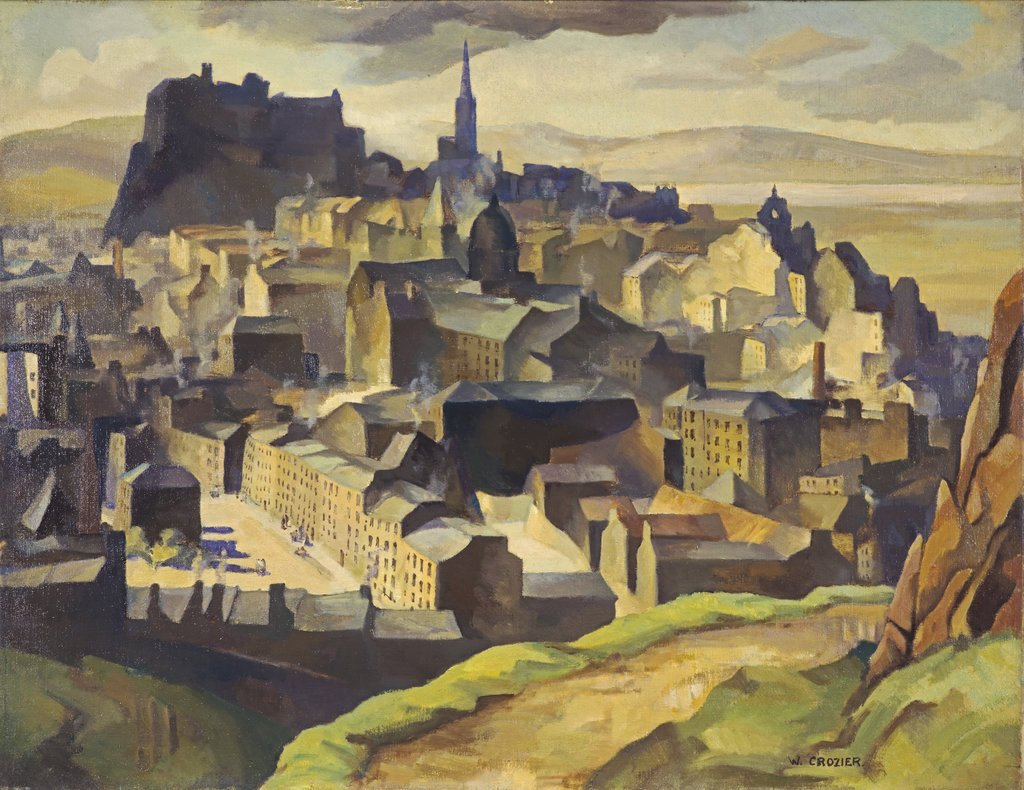
Edinburgh (from Salisbury Crags), 1927, National Gallery of Scotland.

William Crozier (1893 – 1930) was a Scottish landscape painter.

Born in Edinburgh, Crozier studied at Edinburgh College of Art and was a fellow student and friendly with William Geissler, William Gillies, Anne Redpath, Adam Bruce Thomson and William MacTaggart. These artists are all associated with The Edinburgh School.

Assisted by a Carnegie travelling scholarship, together with Geissler and Gillies, Crozier studied under the cubist painter André Lhote in Paris in 1923. In 1924 the three talented young painters pursued their journey to Italy, where Crozier was particularly taken by the bright sunlight and resultant deep shadows, a quality which he later sought to capture in his work. This aspect of his painting and the cubist influences are evident in his 1927 painting, Edinburgh (from Salisbury Crags). The buildings are represented as simple geometric blocks with intense contrast between the sunlit facades and heavily shaded sides. Crozier was elected as an Associate to the Royal Scottish Academy on 19 March 1930.

Crozier suffered from haemophilia and was affected by ill health for most of his life. He died aged only 37 after a fall in his studio. An exhibition of his work was given at the Scottish National Gallery of Modern Art in Edinburgh in 1995.
