= The Singing Street =

Film made in Edinburgh, Scotland

"The Singing Street", is a short film made in 1950 in Edinburgh, Scotland and first shown in 1951. It was created by a group of teachers from Norton Park School, who filmed some of their pupils playing street games, accompanied by traditional children's songs, at various locations in the city. It documented an oral tradition which has all but vanished in the decades since it was made.

== Norton Park School ==
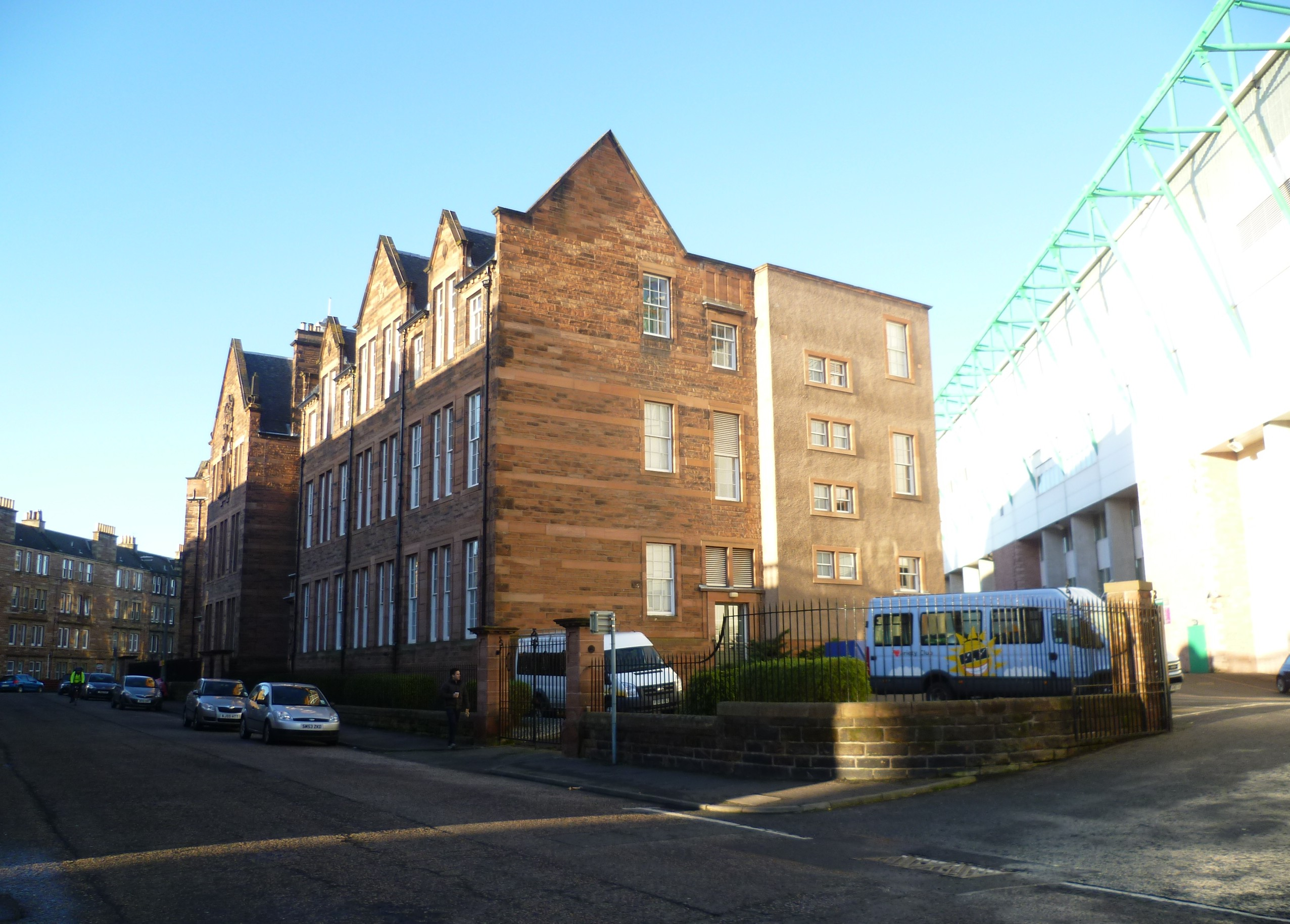
Norton Park School beside Easter Road football stadium

Norton Park was an inner-city Junior Secondary School (equivalent to a Secondary Modern School in England at the time). The old burgh boundary between Edinburgh and Leith runs through the school grounds. The building still stands beside the Easter Road football stadium of Hibernian F.C. but is now a business conference centre. At the time of filming the area was a more industrial environment than now with numerous industrial premises including two major printing works, a large engineering works, a timber merchant's yard and a tobacco factory surrounded by tenement buildings built chiefly for artisans in the second half of the nineteenth century.

The songs were collected by James T.R. Ritchie, a science teacher at the school, assisted by his colleagues Nigel McIsaac and Raymond Townsend, both art teachers. McIsaac produced rough storyboard sketches and calculated timings to provide the shooting script. The camera was operated by William Geissler and Townsend. The songs were recorded subsequently, with no re-takes necessary, and 'dubbed' onto the film. According to the film's production notes, the Scottish poet Norman McCaig supplied the whistling heard on the soundtrack. The 'Norton Park Group' then shot, cut and edited the film themselves, while taking advice from the Scottish Film Council, the British Film Institute and Campbell Harper Films.

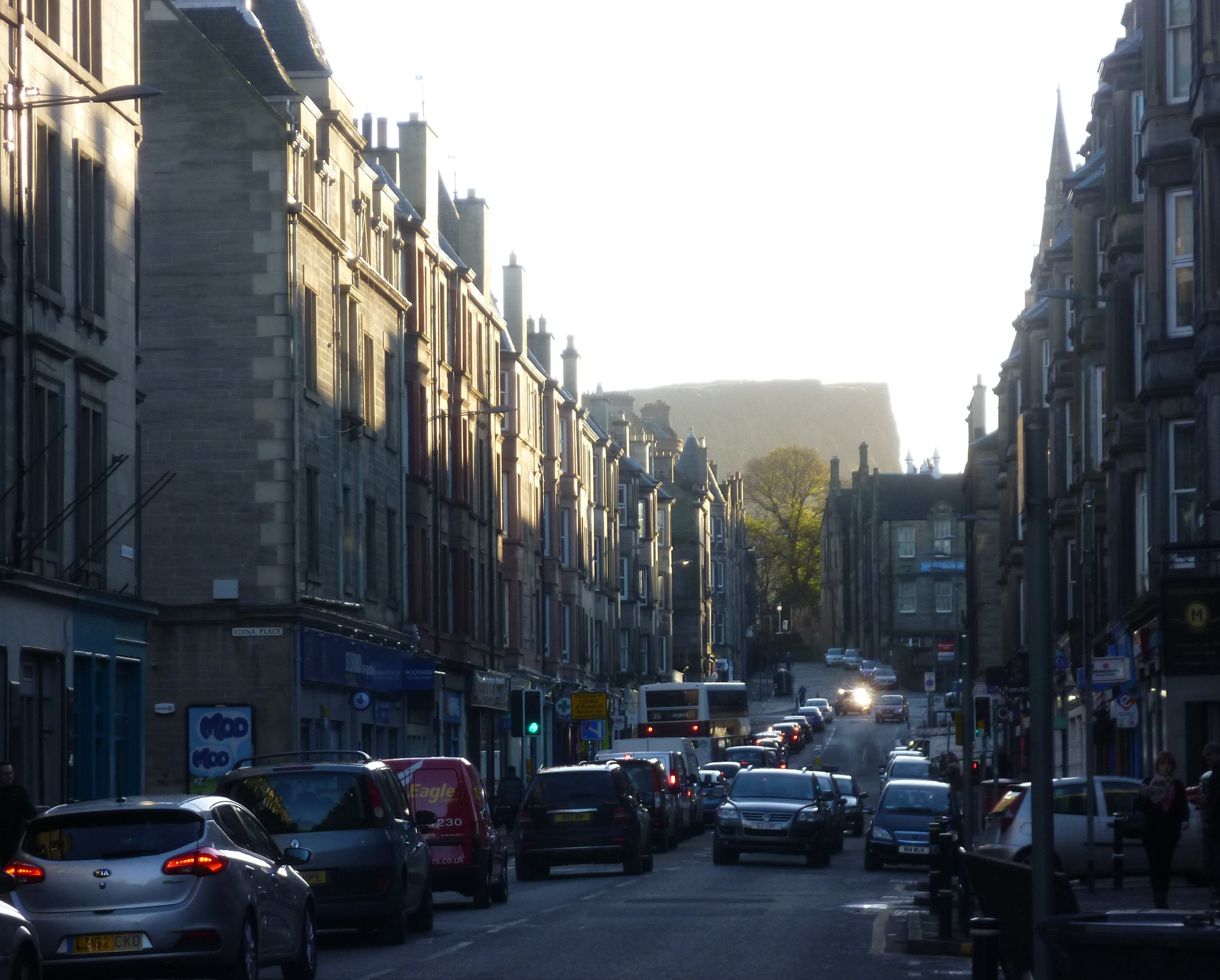
The densely populated Easter Road area of Edinburgh

The film was shot in monochrome and lasts 18 minutes. Its stated purpose was "to show how the singing games are played – in their natural setting. Beginning in the morning and ending with the dusk…"

The cast comprised around 60 pupils, aged between 11 and 14 years of age. Shooting took place on six days during the school Easter holiday break in 1950 in local locations including streets and backgreens (communal drying areas) off Easter Road, and streets around the Calton Hill and in the Canongate, West Bow and the Grassmarket. The Shore, Leith appears briefly at the end of the film.

Most of the games revolve around the themes of love and death (courtship and bereavement), expressed in rhymes passed down the generations by word of mouth. Notes accompanying the issue of the film on video in 1993 explain that "The rhymes…vary from street to street and change from day to day. (…) What is old seldom dies yet there is always something new appearing. The word is accepted and the poetry is kept alive. No one asks: What does that mean?". The songs in the film are accompanied by various skipping and ball games.

The film is subtitled A Merry-Ma Tanzie which is a traditional Scottish wedding game sung to the same tune as Here we go round the Mulberry Bush. Girls join hands in a circle and, at a chosen point, fall to the ground. One player, usually chosen for her slowness in falling, leaves the circle and confides the name of the one she intends to marry to a close friend. The circle members sing verses to guess his name and, on approval, the girl and her friend, as a bridal couple, are welcomed into the circle through "high arches" and kiss. The first recorded mention of the game occurs in Blackwood's Magazine published in Edinburgh in August 1821. In one variation girls form a circle with a player in the middle covering her face while the circle moves slowly round her. The circle sing verses with the girl's name and try to guess her suitor's name. If her true love is revealed, the girl has to show her face and choose a partner. The circle then opens as a gate to allow the bridal couple to pass through. In the variation shown in the film (The Golden City) friends of the girl inside the circle quickly confide with each other to determine her intended sweetheart and name him in the song. She then chooses a partner from the circle in his place to form the bridal couple.

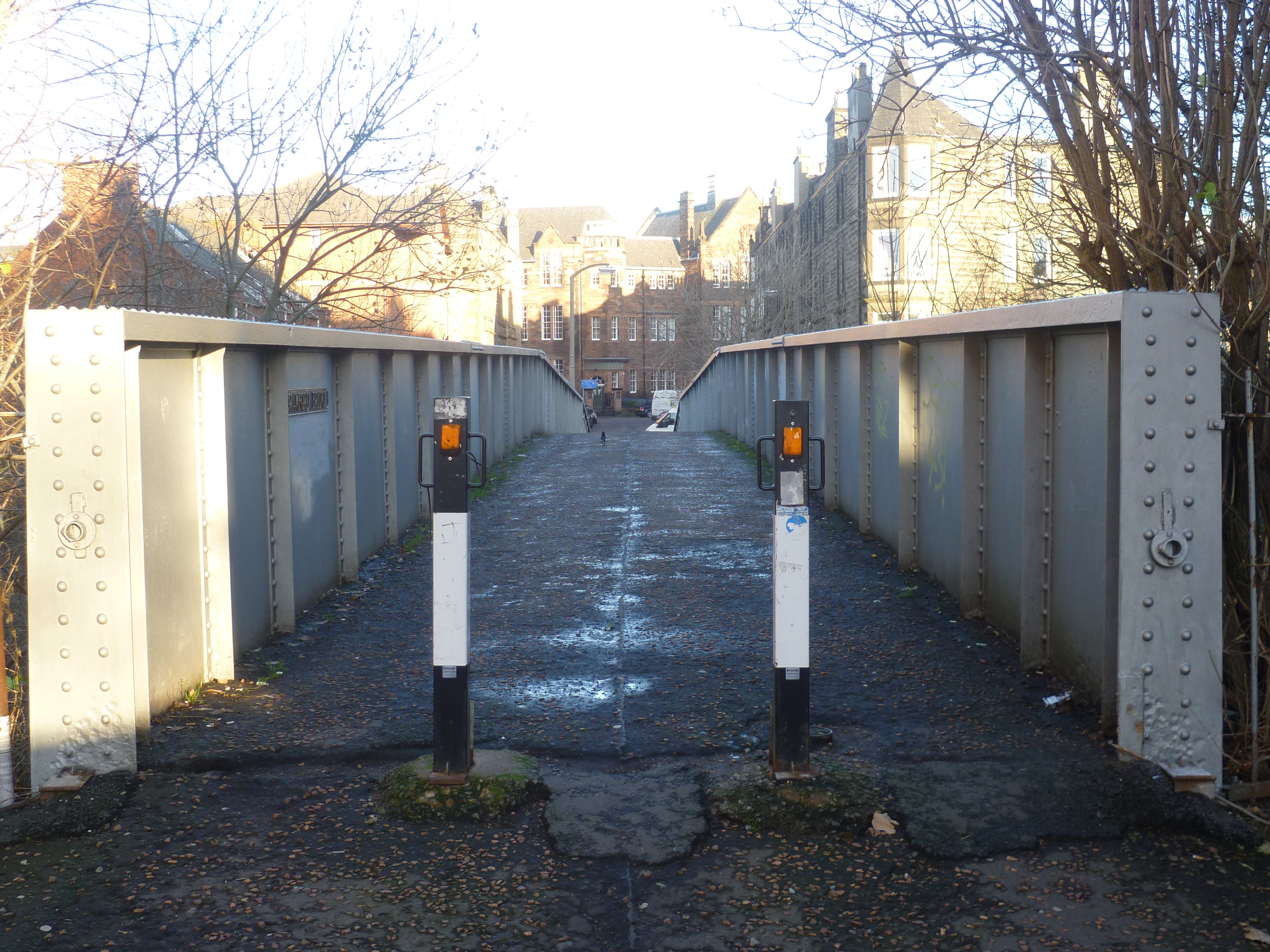
The Crawford Bridge (named after a city councillor) is a footbridge over a now rarely used railway line. It appears several times in the first half of the film. It points directly to Norton Park School which can be seen in the distance.

The film captured a slice of children's history shortly before playing in the street began to decline with the advent of mass television ownership in Britain, though games seen in the film continued to be played in school playgrounds throughout the 1950s and into the 1960s. The 1950s were a time when the Edinburgh Corporation (town council) had designated many inner-city streets "children's play areas", requesting vehicle drivers to avoid them from the end of the school day until sunset. Also, as James Ritchie pointed out in the decade after the film, slum clearance soon transformed the surroundings in which most children grew up: "The tenement-factory conglomeration produced by accident a playing environment of exciting variety: and unless present-day architecture incorporates such ideas, it's dead from the start. The houses in modern schemes are so dull and unmysterious. They have no 'Unknown Corners' such as haunted painters like James Pryde..."

The film received praise when it was shown at the UNICA Festival in Barcelona Film Festival in 1952. John Grierson, "father of the documentary", wrote that it was "the best amateur film I ever saw... The reason for it being wonderful was quite simple. Somebody loved something and conveyed it."

James Ritchie later wrote two short books about children's songs, The Singing Street (1964) and Golden City (1965). In the latter he described how his interest in the children's games had been first aroused,

One morning in Norton Park School, I was teaching science in Leith [the part of the school inside Leith's boundary], and finding the response on this occasion not very lively, I asked, "Then what do you like doing?" The class answered: "We like playing games." "What games?" They told me, and I began then and there to write them down. In the afternoon whilst teaching mathematics in Edinburgh [the part of the school inside Edinburgh's boundary], I also found time to jot down some more games. From then on I collected every sort of rhyme or playing jingle, and my collection grew."

The US folk-song collector Alan Lomax made audio recordings of the Norton Park pupils during the first of his three field trips to Scotland in 1951, 1953 and 1957. These can be heard on the still widely available CD entitled Singing in the Streets: Scottish Children’s Songs. Lomax was a major inspiration behind the founding of the School of Scottish Studies at Edinburgh University in the same year the film was first shown.

One scene, where a group of boys are singing on a flight of steps, features an onlooker wearing a hat and gloves and holding a walking stick. This is Pat Murray, an Edinburgh Councillor. As an avid collector of children's toys, he was the prime mover behind the creation of Edinburgh's Museum of Childhood which opened in 1955 and is now a major tourist attraction housed on the city's Royal Mile.

== The featured songs ==
1. The Golden City
2. Weary, weary, waiting on you
3. Down to the baker's shop
4. Sweet Jenny
5. On the Mountain
6. The Bluebird
7. Bluebells and dummie shells
8. O alla tinka
9. Little sandy girl
10. Three Jews from Spain
11. The bonny bunch of roses
12. The Dusting Bluebells
13. The Golden City
14. When I was single
15. Up and down
16. Plainie, clappie
17. I Sent Her For Butter
18. Down in the valley
19. Orphan girl
20. The night was dark
21. I once had a boy
22. Broken-hearted I wandered

== Film content summary ==
00.08 - pan of Edinburgh Old Town from Princes Street (possibly from first-level platform of the Scott Monument)
00.56 - tilt view of Crawford Bridge and Albion Terrace with the Calton Hill in the distance from Norton Park School
01.06 - Title: The Singing Street chalked on wall
01.17 - girl calls from street to open tenement window (probably Albion Terrace); two girls double-skipping past a St. Cuthbert's Co-operative milk cart in Albion Road; girl reflected in shop window singing to herself; girls double-skipping
02.03 - two girls with third skipping in Albion Terrace
02.17 - girls skipping with Crawford Bridge in background
02.23 - girl playing with diabolo
02.27 pedestrians in Leith Street
02.32 - girls playing ring game on road setts
02.58 - girls skipping in Bothwell Street with Crawford Bridge behind
03.15 - girls in ring game at end of Bothwell Street with Crawford Bridge on left
03.36 - junction of Calton Road and Leith Street
03.39 - girl in ring behind Bothwell Street tenement with locomotive steam behind
03.51 - aerial view of two girls crossing Crawford Bridge from Albion Terrace to Bothwell Street
04.15 - girls playing next to timber yard behind Bothwell Street tenement
05.04 - pan up from Bothwell Street to Salisbury Crags
05.10 - pan down from Salisbury Crags to girls skipping in St. John Street with Holyrood Road behind (Moray House teacher training college on the left)
05.31 - girls on steps (unidentified location, possibly off Leith Street)
06.20 - follow-my-leader ring game in Norton Park School playground
07.10 - junction of Calton Road and Leith Street
07.16 - Abbey Mount: view from London Road Gardens of a No.1 bus crossing the junction with a "steamie" (municipal laundry) in background
07.36 - girls in ring game, Royal Terrace, Calton Hill
07.46 - The Golden City rhyme chalked on pavement
08.48 - girls skipping along Royal Terrace past Greenside Church towards Leith Walk
09.25 - pedestrians and traffic at the top of Leith Street
09.33 - three girls skipping in Calton Road below the Regent Arch
10.10 - view of Calton Road looking towards Leith Street from the Regent Arch
10.17 - girl "stottin' a ba' off a wa' " in one of the Abbeyhill "rows"; boys playing "bools" (marbles)—"Come on, away ye go! This is a lassies' den!"—girl playing "peevers" (hopscotch); boys singing (probably steps in Alva Place); another girl bouncing a ball off a wall
12.01 - bird’s-eye view of West Norton Place from Regent Road School; girls double-rope skipping with tram in London Road passing top of Easter Road; slow-motion skipping sequence; girl roller-skating
12.42 - top of Victoria Street from George IV Bridge; girls playing hide-and-seek on Victoria Terrace and the Upper Bow Steps; group of girls on Victoria Terrace with India Buildings behind; Bowfoot rooftops
13.49 - girls skipping at gates of the Eastern Cemetery, Drum Place; angels drawn in chalk on pavement
14.13 - unidentified rooftops; girl skipping in street with coal merchant’s lorry behind (unidentified location)
14.45 - top of Victoria Street (showing steel frame construction of the National Library of Scotland, erected in 1939 but completed only after the war, 1950–55); girls skipping down Victoria Terrace and Victoria Street, left and right; Margaret 'Peggy' McGillivray on street turns curve of the Bowfoot; girls wave farewell; Bowfoot rooftops; Peggy continues down towards the Grassmarket, but emerges at Sandport Place Bridge on The Shore, Leith.
