= Society of Scottish Artists =

The Society of Scottish Artists is a Scottish artist-run organisation which seeks to promote and encourage experimentation and the "adventurous spirit" in Scottish art.

It was founded in 1891 by Patrick Geddes, William Gordon Burn Murdoch and Katharine Cameron (artist sister of David Young Cameron) and its main space for annual exhibitions has been the Royal Scottish Academy Building on Princes Street in Edinburgh. The first president was Robert Noble.

The society's exhibition policy has long been outward-looking. In 1931 it provided a first UK exhibition for works by Edvard Munch, who became a member of the society. The exhibition met with some hostility in the press and some members of the SSA resigned, but it also influenced artists such as William Gillies and William MacTaggart.

In recent years the society has organised exchange visits and exhibitions with artists in Japan and the United States.

The society is one of the constituent organisations of ESSA.

== See also ==
- Visual Arts Scotland
