= Anne Redpath =

Scottish painter (1895–1965)

- Self-portrait
- Born: 1895; Galashiels, Scotland
- Died: 1965 (aged 69–70); Edinburgh, Scotland
- Known for: Painting
- Movement: The Edinburgh School
- Spouse: James Michie (m. 1920)

Anne Redpath OBE ARA (1895–1965) was a Scottish artist whose vivid domestic still lifes are among her best-known works.

== Life ==
In the Chapel of St Jean, Tréboul, 1954, Royal Scottish Academy. A fine example of Redpath's use of a restrained palette with splashes of vibrant colour.

Redpath's father was a tweed designer in the Scottish Borders. She saw a connection between his use of colour and her own. "I do with a spot of red or yellow in a harmony of grey, what my father did in his tweed." The Redpaths moved from Galashiels to Hawick when Anne was about six. After Hawick High School, she went to Edinburgh College of Art in 1913. Post-graduate study led to a scholarship which allowed her to travel on the Continent in 1919, visiting Bruges, Paris, Florence and Siena.

The following year, 1920, she married James Michie, an architect, and they went to live in Pas-de-Calais where her first two sons were born; the eldest of whom is the painter and sculptor Alastair Michie. In 1924, they moved to the South of France, and in 1928, had a third son: now David Michie the artist.

In 1934, she returned to Hawick. Redpath was soon exhibiting in Edinburgh, and was president of the Scottish Society of Women Artists from 1944 to 1947. The Royal Scottish Academy admitted her as an associate in 1947, and in 1952, she became the first woman painter Academician (the sculptor Phyllis Bone, elected in 1944, was the first female Academician). In 1955, she was made an OBE for her work as "Artist" and "Member of the Board of Management of the Edinburgh College of Art".

With her children grown up, and an active involvement in Edinburgh art circles, she moved to live in town at the end of the 1940s. In the 1950s and early 1960s, she also travelled in Europe, painting in Spain, the Canary Islands, Corsica, Brittany, Venice and elsewhere.

There is a commemorative plaque on the house where she lived and entertained at 7 London Street, Edinburgh.

== Painting ==
The Indian Rug, 1942, National Gallery of Scotland.

The poppy Field, circa 1963, Tate Gallery. A typical example of Redpath's later work featuring flowers.

Redpath is probably best known for her still lifes where familiar household objects - a chair, a cup - are made into a "two-dimensional" design. She used textiles - a printed tablecloth, a spotted scarf - to add a pattern within the pattern. The Indian Rug, also known as Red Shoes, is a good example of this group of paintings. Matisse's influence is clear in these bold, flat-surfaced interior arrangements. Critics see another influence in the tabletops tilted to suit the design, not conventional perspective: that of the medieval Sienese paintings which impressed her on her first trip abroad. At this time she first discovered the richness of Catholic imagery (unfamiliar to a young woman brought up as a Scottish Protestant), a theme explored in her later work.

She and a group of her contemporaries are sometimes called The Edinburgh School. They may be seen as the "heirs" of the Scottish Colourists: Redpath's The Orange Chair, for example, suggests the Colourist heritage. Due to attaining a scholarship, Redpath had the opportunity to travel to many European countries in which she was inspired by architecture and interior art.

During her years in France (1920–1933), Redpath's painting was limited by family commitments, but she produced enough for exhibitions in 1921 and 1928. She also decorated furniture with bright flower and bird patterns. (See Still Life with Painted Chest) Later there would be many paintings of flowers: in vases, or growing abundant in the wild. (The Poppy Field) Redpath became heavily influenced by the likes of Matisse and Bonnard.

On her return to Scotland in 1934, she started to sketch the countryside around Hawick, and painted landscapes with a more muted look than much of her work: Frosty Morning, Trow Mill (1936), for example. In the early 1940s The Indian Rug showed that she was developing the freer, individual approach described above. Other works representing this style include The Mantelpiece and Still Life with Table.

Her circa 1943 self-portrait was solicited by Ruth Borchard, who created a collection of 100 self-portraits of modern British artists. Redpath sent Borchard the painting in 1964, taking care to mark the date as 1943 because she did not want people to think she had painted herself as 20 years younger. A friend who travelled to Spain with Redpath in 1951 described her appearance: "Anne looked like Queen Victoria; black hair correctly parted in the centre and bun behind, but she wore colours!" The formal severity of the portrait is similarly mitigated by touches of colour in the same way as her father had introduced threads of vivid colour in his otherwise sober tweeds.

Window in Menton, painted in 1948, a favourite of Redpath's, is also a richly-textured surface with familiar elements - flowers, chair, printed wallpaper - but here a seated woman looks towards an open full-length window. The view is of a hillside patterned with houses and trees.

Redpath painted more hillsides, like Les Tourettes (1962), as she travelled in the later years of her life, but her interest was still often interior. Her Courtyard in Venice (1964) is another view from inside looking outwards.

Some later works reflect religious influences, especially paintings of altars in The Chapel of St Jean - Treboul (1954) and Venetian Altar. These are highly regarded by commentators who admire her mature work even more than the pieces from the 1940s.

== Exhibitions ==
Portland Gallery held a large exhibition of works by Redpath in July 2008.
