= John Maxwell (British artist) =

Scottish painter (1905–1962)

Night Flowers, 1959, Tate Gallery. One of a series of four paintings on the theme of moths, butterflies and flowers.

John Maxwell (12 July 1905 – 3 June 1962) was a Scottish painter of landscapes and imaginative subjects.

== Life ==
Born in Dalbeattie in Kirkcudbrightshire, Maxwell studied at Edinburgh College of Art from 1921 to 1927 and then, with the aid of a travelling scholarship, from 1927 to 1928 at the Académie Moderne in Paris under Léger and Ozenfant. He also travelled to Italy and Spain during this period, where he discovered the work of Chagall and the Symbolists.

These experiences influenced his work for the remainder of his career. Maxwell was a lifelong friend of William Gillies with whom he frequently travelled on painting trips. Along with Gillies, he was one of the group of artists who became known as The Edinburgh School.

Maxwell taught intermittently at Edinburgh College of Art from 1928 to 1933, 1935 to 1946, and 1955 to 1961.

He first exhibited at the Royal Scottish Academy in 1935 and became a full member in 1949.
