= William George Gillies =

Scottish painter (1898–1973)

Two Pots, Saucer and Fruit, 1933, Royal Scottish Academy.

The harbour, 1934, National Gallery of Scotland.

Sir William George Gillies CBE RA (21 September 1898 – 15 April 1973) was a renowned Scottish landscape and still life painter. He is often referred to simply as W. G. Gillies.

== Life ==
Gillies was born in Haddington, East Lothian and is brother of the potter Emma Smith Gillies. He had just enrolled at the Edinburgh College of Art, when he was called up for service in World War I with the Royal Engineers. After the War, he returned to the College, and after graduation taught there for over 40 years with other notable Scottish artists including Adam Bruce Thomson. He was Principal of the College from 1959 until his retirement in 1966. In 1922 along with nine fellow students, including William Crozier, William Geissler and William MacTaggart, he founded the 1922 Group, an exhibition society which promoted their works at the New Gallery in Edinburgh for the next ten years.

Assisted by a travelling scholarship, Gillies studied under André Lhote in Paris in 1923 and he went on to visit Italy in 1924. For a brief period after these experiences he worked in a cubist manner, but would later revert to a more traditional style. His cubist influenced works are typified by the 1933 still life, Two Pots, Saucer and Fruit. The arrangement of the objects, which are close together on a tilted table top, are influenced by Cézanne, whereas the understated colours and textures are reminiscent of Braque and Picasso.

In 1934 Gillies attended an exhibition of Paul Klee's work and was impressed by the childlike qualities and imaginative use of colour that he saw. Klee's influence is clear in Gillies' 1934 work, The Harbour, which depicts the harbour at Anstruther. Gillies has created a grid-like composition, using bold blocks of contrasting colour emphasising the vertical lines of the buildings and the ships masts. This is balanced by the use of rippling horizontal brushstrokes.

Although he experimented with portraiture in his early career, Gillies concentrated principally on landscapes and still lifes, frequently depicting the Lothian, Fife and Border regions. Several of his works feature ceramics created by his younger sister, the potter Emma Smith Gillies, who died prematurely in 1936. Both in his prolific output over the course of his career, and in his 40 years of teaching, Gillies influence on Scottish painting of the twentieth century has been profound.
