= Lowndes =

Lowndes (/laʊndz/) may refer to:

== People with the surname ==
- Alan Lowndes (1921–1978), British painter
- Alan Lowndes (rugby), English rugby league and union player
- Christopher Lowndes (1713–1785), early settler and merchant at Bladensburg, Maryland
- Craig Lowndes (born 1974), Australian racing driver
- Dorothy Margarette Selby Lowndes (1871-1950), English writer using pseudonym Dolf Wyllarde
- Emma Lowndes (born 1975), English actress
- Eric Lowndes (born 1994), Irish Gaelic footballer
- Geoffrey Lowndes (1898–1982), English cricketer
- Gillian Lowndes (1936–2010), English ceramist and sculptor
- Jason Lowndes (1994–2017), Australian cyclist
- Jefferson Lowndes (1858–1893), English rower
- Jessica Lowndes (born 1988), Canadian actress and singer-songwriter
- Lloyd Lowndes, Jr. (1845–1905), American politician
- Marie Adelaide Belloc Lowndes (1868–1947), English writer
- Mary Lowndes (1856–1929), British artist
- Nathan Lowndes (born 1977), English footballer
- Rawlins Lowndes (1721–1800), American lawyer and politician
- Richard Lowndes (disambiguation), multiple people
- Robert A. W. Lowndes (1916–1998), American science fiction writer and editor
- Sarah Lowndes, Scottish writer and curator
- Steve Lowndes (born 1960), Welsh footballer
- Thomas Lowndes (disambiguation), multiple people
- Timothy Lowndes (born 1979), Australian sport shooter
- William Lowndes (disambiguation), multiple people

== Places ==
- Lowndes County, Alabama
- Lowndes County, Georgia
- Lowndes County, Mississippi
- Lowndes, Missouri, an unincorporated community in Wayne County, Missouri, United States
- Lowndes Square, a garden square in Belgravia, London, England

== Other uses ==
- USS Lowndes (APA-154), a Haskell-class attack transport of the United States Navy
