= Scottish art =

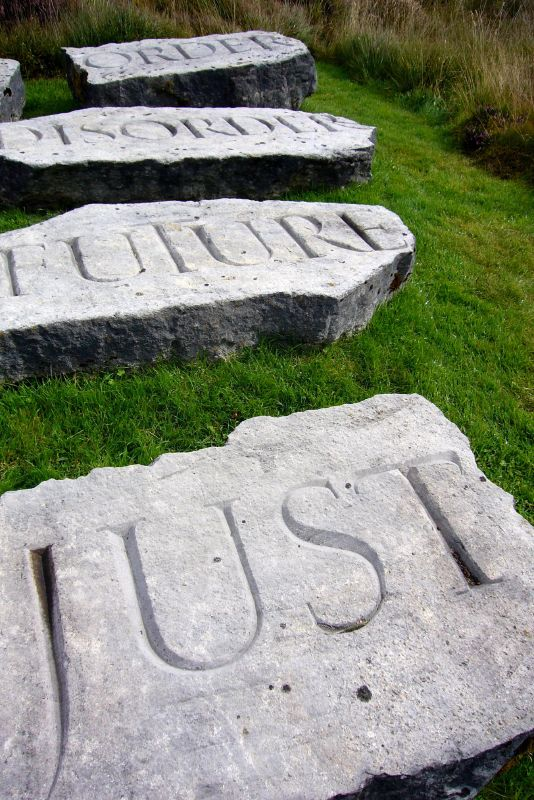
Part of the combination of sculpture and landscape used at Ian Hamilton Finlay's Little Sparta

Scottish art is the body of visual art made in what is now Scotland, or about Scottish subjects, since prehistoric times. It forms a distinctive tradition within European art, but the political union with England has led its partial subsumation in British art.

The earliest examples of art from what is now Scotland are highly decorated carved stone balls from the Neolithic period. From the Bronze Age there are examples of carvings, including the first representations of objects, and cup and ring marks. More extensive Scottish examples of patterned objects and gold work are found the Iron Age. Elaborately carved Pictish stones and impressive metalwork emerged in Scotland the early Middle Ages. The development of a common style of Insular art across Great Britain and Ireland influenced elaborate jewellery and illuminated manuscripts such as the Book of Kells. Only isolated examples survive of native artwork from the late Middle Ages and of works created or strongly influenced by artists of Flemish origin. The influence of the Renaissance can be seen in stone carving and painting from the fifteenth century. In the sixteenth century the crown began to employ Flemish court painters who have left a portrait record of royalty. The Reformation removed a major source of patronage for art and limited the level of public display, but may have helped in the growth of secular domestic forms, particularly elaborate painting of roofs and walls. Although the loss of the court as a result of the Union of Crowns in 1603 removed another major source of patronage, the seventeenth century saw the emergence of the first significant native artists for whom names are extant, with figures such as George Jamesone and John Michael Wright.

In the eighteenth century Scotland began to produce artists that were significant internationally, all influenced by neoclassicism, such as Allan Ramsay, Gavin Hamilton, the brothers John and Alexander Runciman, Jacob More and David Allan. Towards the end of the century Romanticism began to influence artistic production, and can be seen in the portraits of artists such as Henry Raeburn. It also contributed to a tradition of Scottish landscape painting that focused on the Highlands, formulated by figures including Alexander Nasmyth. The Royal Scottish Academy of Art was created in 1826, and major portrait painters of this period included Andrew Geddes and David Wilkie. William Dyce emerged as one of the most significant figures in art education in the United Kingdom. The beginnings of a Celtic Revival can be seen in the late nineteenth century and the art scene was dominated by the work of the Glasgow Boys and the Four, led Charles Rennie Mackintosh, who gained an international reputation for their combination of Celtic revival, Art and Crafts and Art Nouveau. The early twentieth century was dominated by the Scottish Colourists and the Edinburgh School. Modernism enjoyed popularity during this period, with William Johnstone helping to develop the concept of a Scottish Renaissance. In the post-war period, major artists, including John Bellany and Alexander Moffat, pursued a strand of "Scottish realism". Moffat's influence can be seen in the work of the "new Glasgow Boys" from the late twentieth century. In the twenty-first century Scotland has continued to produce successful and influential artists such as Douglas Gordon and Susan Philipsz.

Scotland possess significant collections of art, such as the National Gallery of Scotland and National Museum of Scotland in Edinburgh and the Burrell Collection and Kelvingrove Art Gallery and Museum in Glasgow. Significant schools of art include the Edinburgh College of Art and the Glasgow School of Art. The major funding body with responsibility for the arts in Scotland is Creative Scotland. Support is also given by local councils and independent foundations.

== History ==
=== Prehistoric art ===
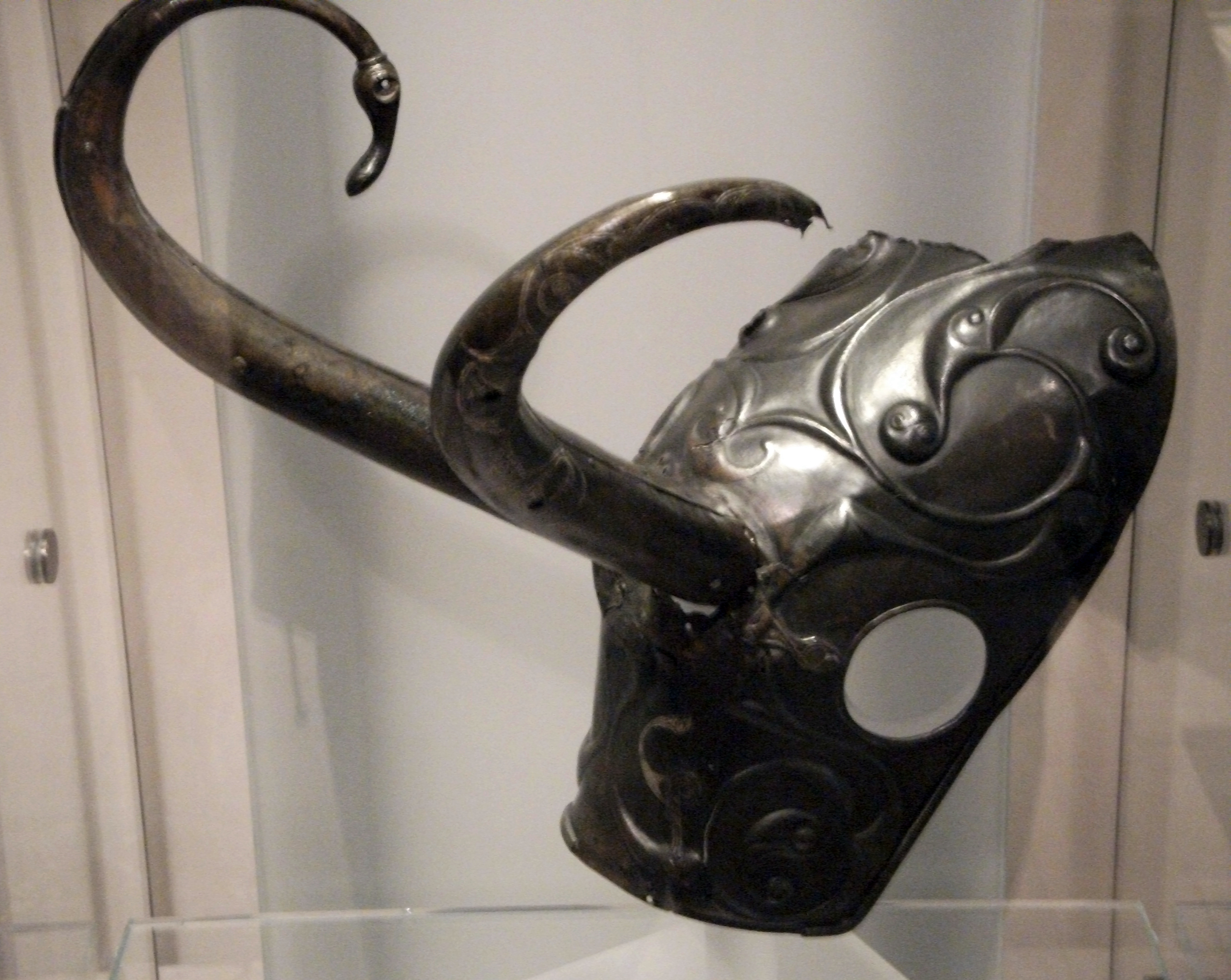
The Torrs Pony-cap and Horns, as displayed in 2011

The oldest known examples of art to survive from Scotland are carved stone balls, or petrospheres, that date from the late Neolithic era. They are a uniquely Scottish phenomenon, with over 425 known examples. Most are from modern Aberdeenshire, but a handful of examples are known from Iona, Skye, Harris, Uist, Lewis, Arran, Hawick, Wigtownshire and fifteen from Orkney, five of which were found at the Neolithic village of Skara Brae. Many functions have been suggested for these objects, most indicating that they were prestigious and powerful possessions. Their production may have continued into the Iron Age.

From the Bronze Age there are extensive examples of rock art. These include cup and ring marks, a central depression carved into stone, surrounded by rings, sometimes not completed. These are common elsewhere in Atlantic Europe and have been found on natural rocks and isolated stones across Scotland. The most elaborate sets of markings are in western Scotland, particularly in the Kilmartin district. The representations of an axe and a boat at the Ri Cruin Cairn in Kilmartin, and a boat pecked into Wemyss Cave, are believed to be the oldest known representations of real objects that survive in Scotland. Carved spirals have also been found on the cover stones of burial cists in Lanarkshire and Kincardine.

By the Iron Age, Scotland had been penetrated by the wider La Tène culture. The Torrs Pony-cap and Horns are perhaps the most impressive of the relatively few finds of La Tène decoration from Scotland, and indicate links with Ireland and southern Britain. The Stirling torcs, found in 2009, are a group of four gold torcs in different styles, dating from 300 BC and 100 BC Two demonstrate common styles found in Scotland and Ireland, but the other two indicate workmanship from what is now southern France and the Greek and Roman worlds.

=== Middle Ages ===
In the Early Middle Ages, four distinct linguistic and political groupings existed in what is now Scotland, each of which produced distinct material cultures. In the east were the Picts, whose kingdoms eventually stretched from the River Forth to Shetland. In the west were the Gaelic (Goidelic)-speaking people of Dál Riata, who had close links with Ireland, from where they brought with them the name Scots. In the south were the British (Brythonic-speaking) descendants of the peoples of the Roman-influenced kingdoms of "The Old North", the most powerful and longest surviving of which was the Kingdom of Strathclyde. Finally, there were the English or "Angles", Germanic invaders who had overrun much of southern Britain and held the Kingdom of Bernicia (later the northern part of Northumbria), which reached into what are now the Borders of Scotland in the south-east.

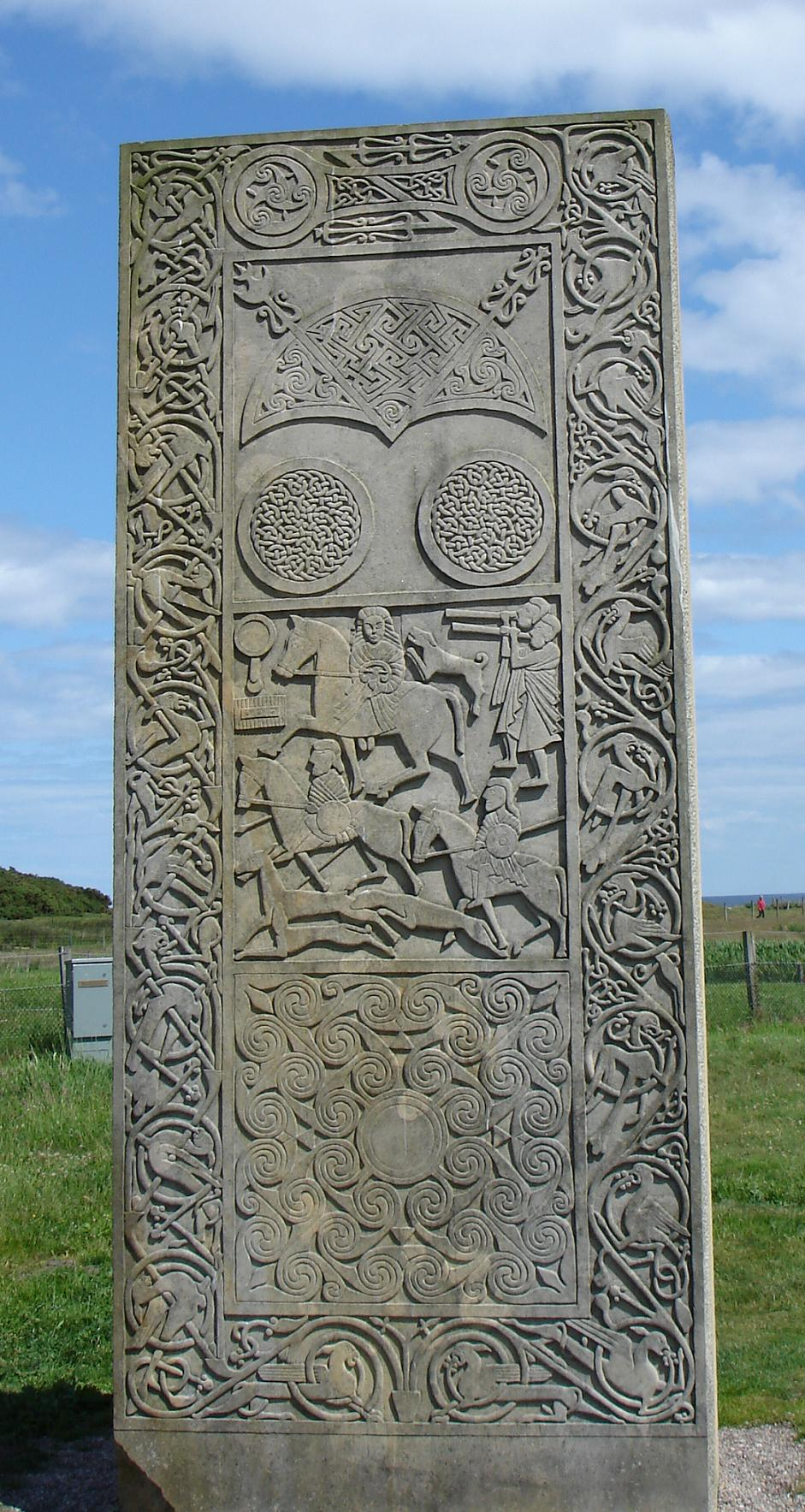
A replica of the Hilton of Cadboll Stone

Only fragments of artefacts survive from the Brythonic speaking kingdoms of southern Scotland. Pictish art can be seen in the extensive survival of carved Pictish stones, particularly in the north and east of the country. These display a variety of recurring images and patterns, as at Dunrobin (Sutherland) and Aberlemno (Angus). There are a few survivals of Pictish silver, notably a number of massive neck-chains including the Whitecleuch Chain, and also the unique silver plaques from the cairn at Norrie's Law. Irish-Scots art from the kingdom of Dál Riata is much more difficult to identify, but may include items such as the Hunterston brooch, which with other items such as the Monymusk Reliquary, suggest that Dál Riata was one of the places, as a crossroads between cultures, where the Insular style developed. Early examples of Anglo-Saxon art include metalwork, particularly bracelets, clasps and jewellery, that has survived in pagan burials and in exceptional items such as the intricately carved whalebone Franks Casket, thought to have been produced in Northumbria in the early eighth century, which combines pagan, classical and Christian motifs. After the Christian conversion of what is now Scotland in the seventh century, artistic styles in Northumbria interacted with those in Ireland and Scotland to become part of the common style historians have identified as insular or Hiberno-Saxon.

Insular art is the name given to the common style that developed in Britain and Ireland after the conversion of the Picts and the cultural assimilation of Pictish culture into that of the Scots and Angles, and which became highly influential in continental Europe, contributing to the development of Romanesque and Gothic styles. It can be seen in elaborate penannular brooches, often making extensive use of semi-precious stones, in the heavily carved high crosses found most frequently in the Highlands and Islands, but distributed across the country and particularly in the highly decorated illustrated manuscripts such as the Book of Kells, which may have been begun, or wholly created on Iona, the key location in Scotland for insular art. The finest era of the style was brought to an end by the disruption to monastic centres and aristocratic life by Viking raids in the late eighth century. Later elaborate metal work has survived in buried hoards such as the St Ninian's Isle Treasure and several finds from the Viking period.

In the High Middle Ages, Scotland adopted the Romanesque in the late twelfth century and retained and revived elements of its style after the Gothic style had become dominant from the thirteenth century. Much of the best Scottish artwork of the High and Late Middle Ages was either religious in nature or realised in metal and woodwork, and did not survive the effect of time and of the Reformation. However, examples of sculpture are extant as part of church architecture, including evidence of elaborate church interiors such as the sacrament houses at Deskford and Kinkell and the carvings of the seven deadly sins at Rosslyn Chapel. From the thirteenth century, there are relatively large numbers of monumental effigies such as the elaborate Douglas tombs in the town of Douglas. Native craftsmanship can be seen in items such as the Bute mazer and the Savernake Horn, and more widely in the large number of high quality seals that survive from the mid thirteenth century onwards. Visual illustration can be seen in the illumination of charters, and occasional survivals such as the fifteenth-century Doom painting at Guthrie. As in England, the monarchy may have had model portraits of royalty used for copies and reproductions, but the versions of native royal portraits that survive are generally crude by continental standards.

=== European Renaissance ===
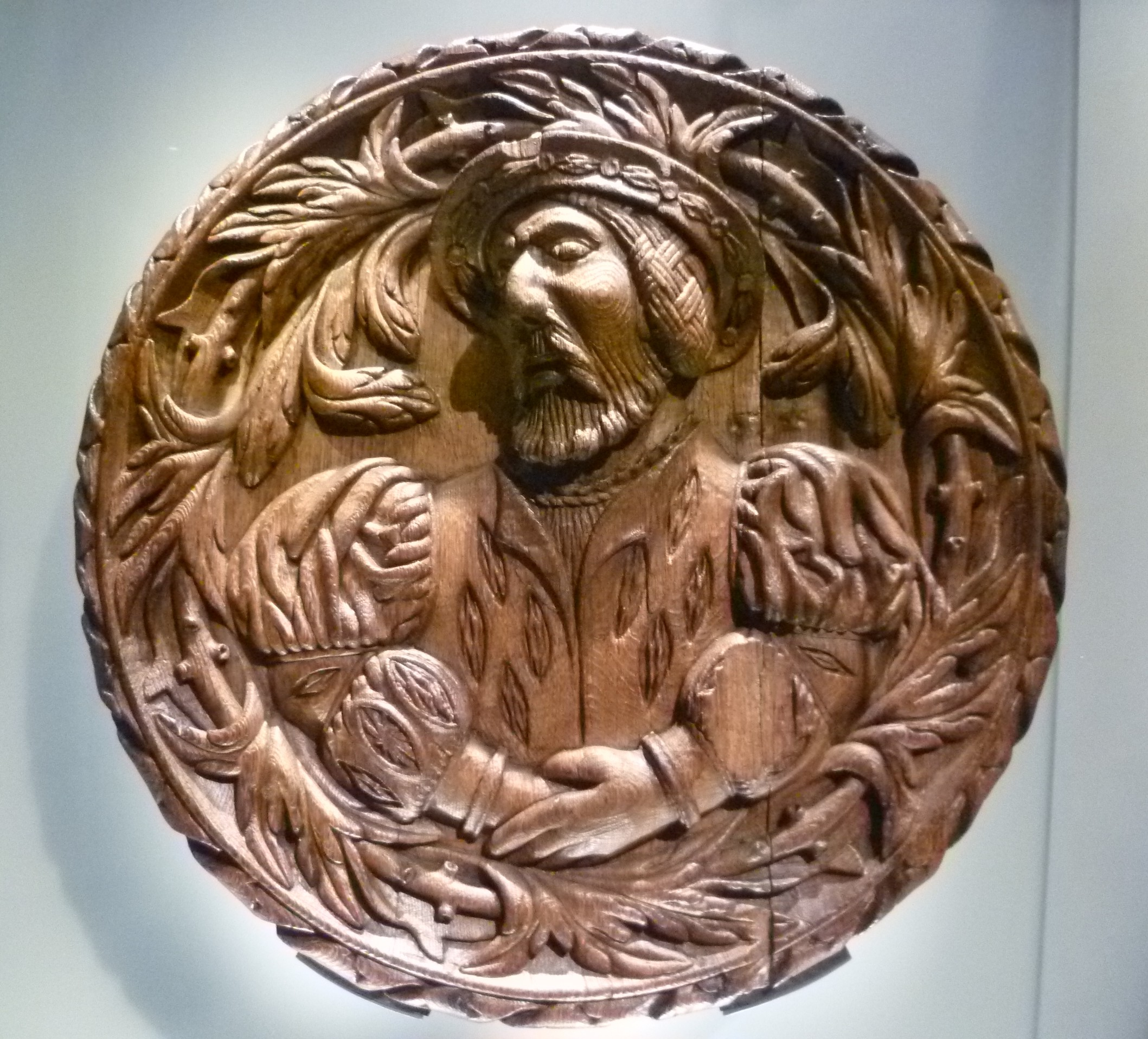
One of the Stirling Heads showing James V

Beginning in the fifteenth century, a number of works were produced in Scotland by artists imported from the continent, particularly the Netherlands, generally considered the centre of painting in the Northern Renaissance. The products of these connections included a fine portrait of William Elphinstone; the images of St Catherine and St John brought to Dunkeld; and Hugo van Der Goes's altarpiece for the Trinity College Church in Edinburgh, commissioned by James III and the work after which the Flemish Master of James IV of Scotland is named. There are also a relatively large number of elaborate devotional books from the late fifteenth and early sixteenth centuries, usually produced in the Low Countries and France for Scottish patrons, including the prayer book commissioned by Robert Blackadder, Bishop of Glasgow, between 1484 and 1492 and the Flemish illustrated book of hours, known as the Hours of James IV of Scotland, given by James IV to Margaret Tudor and described by D. H. Caldwell as "perhaps the finest medieval manuscript to have been commissioned for Scottish use". Records also indicate that Scottish palaces were adorned by rich tapestries, such as those that depicted scenes from the Iliad and Odyssey set up for James IV at Holyrood. Surviving stone and wood carvings, wall paintings and tapestries suggest the richness of sixteenth century royal art. At Stirling Castle, stone carvings on the royal palace from the reign of James V are taken from German patterns, and like the surviving carved oak portrait roundels from the King's Presence Chamber, known as the Stirling Heads, they include contemporary, biblical and classical figures. James V employed French craftsmen including the carver Andrew Mansioun.

=== Reformation ===
During the sixteenth century, Scotland underwent a Protestant Reformation that created a predominantly Calvinist national Church of Scotland (kirk), which was strongly Presbyterian in outlook. Scotland's ecclesiastical art paid a heavy toll as a result of Protestant iconoclasm, with the almost total loss of medieval stained glass, religious sculpture and paintings. The nature of the Scottish Reformation may have had wider effects, limiting the creation of a culture of public display and meaning that art was channelled into more austere forms of expression with an emphasis on private and domestic restraint.

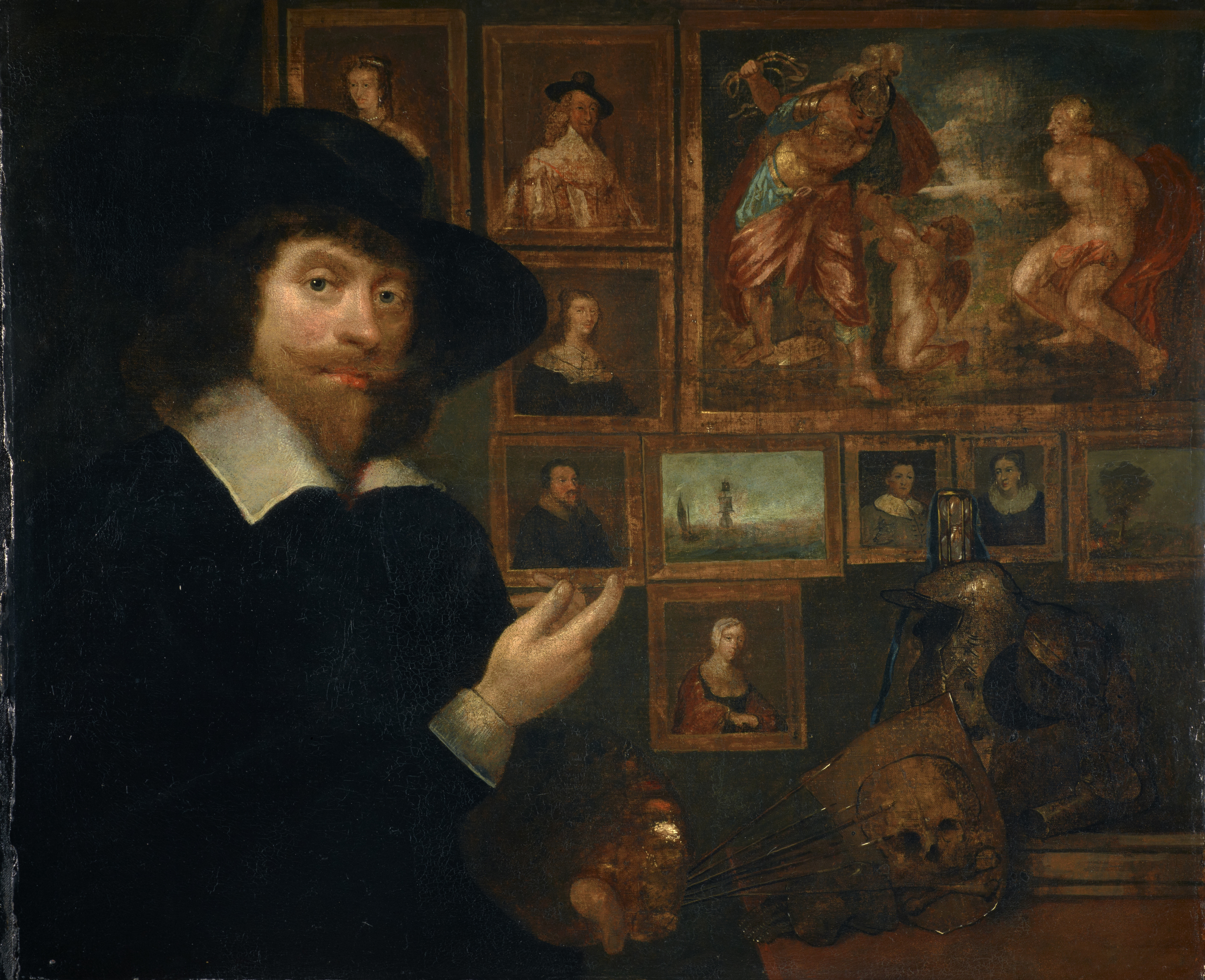
Self portrait of George Jamesone (1642)

The loss of ecclesiastical patronage created a crisis for native craftsmen and artists, who turned to secular patrons. One result of this was the flourishing of Scottish Renaissance painted ceilings and walls, with large numbers of private houses of burgesses, lairds and lords gaining often highly detailed and coloured patterns and scenes, of which over a hundred examples survive. These include the ceiling at Prestongrange, undertaken in 1581 for Mark Kerr, Commendator of Newbattle, and the long gallery at Pinkie House, painted for Alexander Seaton, Earl of Dunfermline in 1621. These were undertaken by unnamed Scottish artists using continental pattern books that often led to the incorporation of humanist moral and philosophical symbolism, with elements that call on heraldry, piety, classical myths and allegory. The tradition of royal portrait painting in Scotland was probably disrupted by the minorities and regencies it underwent for much of the sixteenth century, but began to flourish after the Reformation. There were anonymous portraits of important individuals, including the Earl of Bothwell (1556) and George, fifth Earl of Seaton (c. 1570s). James VI employed two Flemish artists, Arnold Bronckorst in the early 1580s and Adrian Vanson from around 1584 to 1602, who have left us a visual record of the king and major figures at the court. In 1590 Anne of Denmark brought a jeweller Jacob Kroger (d. 1594) from Lüneburg, a centre of the goldsmith's craft.

The Union of Crowns in 1603 removed a major source of artistic patronage in Scotland as James VI and his court moved to London. The result has been seen as a shift "from crown to castle", as the nobility and local lairds became the major sources of patronage. The first significant native artist was George Jamesone of Aberdeen (1589/90-1644), who became one of the most successful portrait painters of the reign of Charles I and trained the Baroque artist John Michael Wright (1617–1694). The growing importance of royal art can be seen in the post created in 1702 for George Ogilvie. The duties included "drawing pictures of our [the Monarch's] person or of our successors or others of our royal family for the decorment of our houses and palaces". However, from 1723 to 1823 the office was a sinecure held by members of the Abercrombie family, not necessarily connected with artistic ability.

=== Eighteenth century ===
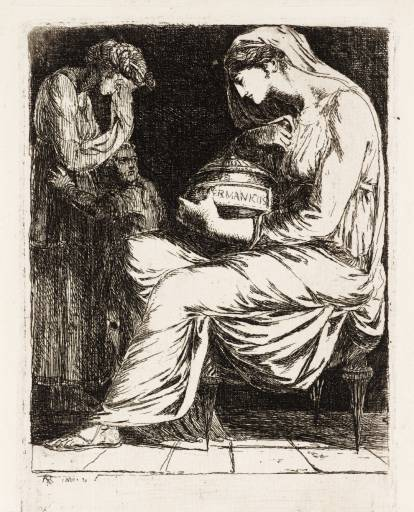
Alexander Runciman, Agrippina with the Ashes of Germanicus (c. 1773)

==== Enlightenment period ====
Many painters of the early part of the eighteenth century remained largely artisans, such as the members of the Norie family, James (1684–1757) and his sons, who painted the houses of the peerage with Scottish landscapes that were pastiches of Italian and Dutch landscapes. The painters Allan Ramsay (1713–1784), Gavin Hamilton (1723–1798), the brothers John (1744–1768/9) and Alexander Runciman (1736–1785), Jacob More (1740–1793) and David Allan (1744–1796), mostly began in the tradition of the Nories, but were artists of European significance, spending considerable portions of their careers outside Scotland, and were to varying degree influenced by forms of Neoclassicism. The influence of Italy was particularly significant, with over fifty Scottish artists and architects known to have travelled there in the period 1730–1780.

Ramsay studied in Sweden, London and Italy before basing himself in Edinburgh, where he established himself as a leading portrait painter to the Scottish nobility. After a second visit to Italy he moved to London in 1757 and from 1761 he was Principal Painter in Ordinary to George III. He now focused on royal portraits, often presented by the king to ambassadors and colonial governors. His work has been seen as anticipating the grand manner of Joshua Reynolds, but many of his early portraits, particularly of women are less formal and more intimate studies. Gavin Hamilton studied at the University of Glasgow and in Rome, and after a brief stay in London, primarily painting portraits of the British aristocracy, he returned to Rome for the rest of his life. He emerged as a pioneering neo-classical painter of historical and mythical themes, including his depictions of scenes from Homer's Iliad, as well as acting as an early archaeologist and antiquarian.

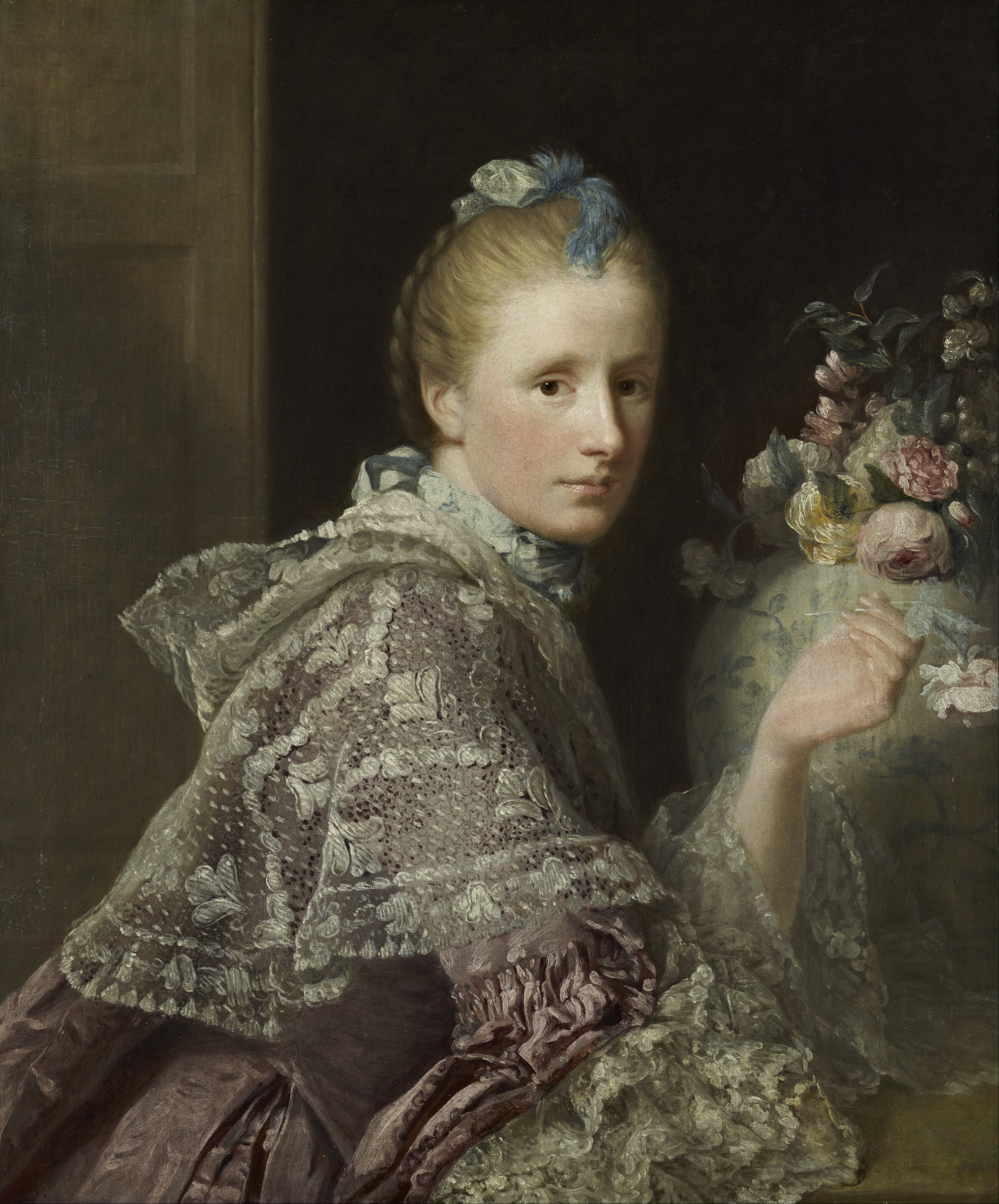
The intimate portrait of his second wife Margaret Lindsay by Allan Ramsay (1758)

John and Alexander Runciman both gained reputations as painters of mythological and historical themes. They travelled to Italy, where John died in 1768/9. Alexander returned home to gain a reputation as a landscape and portrait painter. His most widely known work, distributed in etchings, was mythological. More, having trained with the Nories, like his friend Ramsey, moved to Italy from 1773 and is chiefly known as a landscape painter. Allan travelled to Rome from 1764 to 1777, where he studied with Hamilton. He produced historical and mythical scenes before moving to England, where he pursued portraiture. He then returned to Edinburgh in 1780, became director and master of the Academy of Arts in 1786. Here he produced his most famous work, with illustrations of themes from Scottish life, earning him the title of "the Scottish Hogarth".

==== Romanticism ====
Scotland played a major part in the origins of the Romantic movement through the publication of James Macpherson's Ossian cycle, which was proclaimed as a Celtic equivalent of the Classical epics. Fingal, written in 1762, was speedily translated into many European languages, and its deep appreciation of natural beauty and the melancholy tenderness of its treatment of the ancient legend did more than any single work to bring about the Romantic movement in European, and especially in German literature, influencing Herder and Goethe. Ossian became a common subject for Scottish artists, and works were undertaken by Alexander Runciman and David Allan among others. This period saw a shift in attitudes to the Highlands and mountain landscapes in general, from viewing them as hostile, empty regions occupied by backwards and marginal people, to interpreting them as aesthetically pleasing exemplars of nature, occupied by rugged primitives, which were now depicted in a dramatic fashion. Produced before his departure to Italy, Jacob More's series of four paintings "Falls of Clyde" (1771–73) have been described by art historian Duncan Macmillan as treating the waterfalls as "a kind of natural national monument" and has been seen as an early work in developing a romantic sensibility to the Scottish landscape. Alexander Runciman was probably the first artist to paint Scottish landscapes in watercolours in the more romantic style that was emerging towards the end of the eighteenth century.

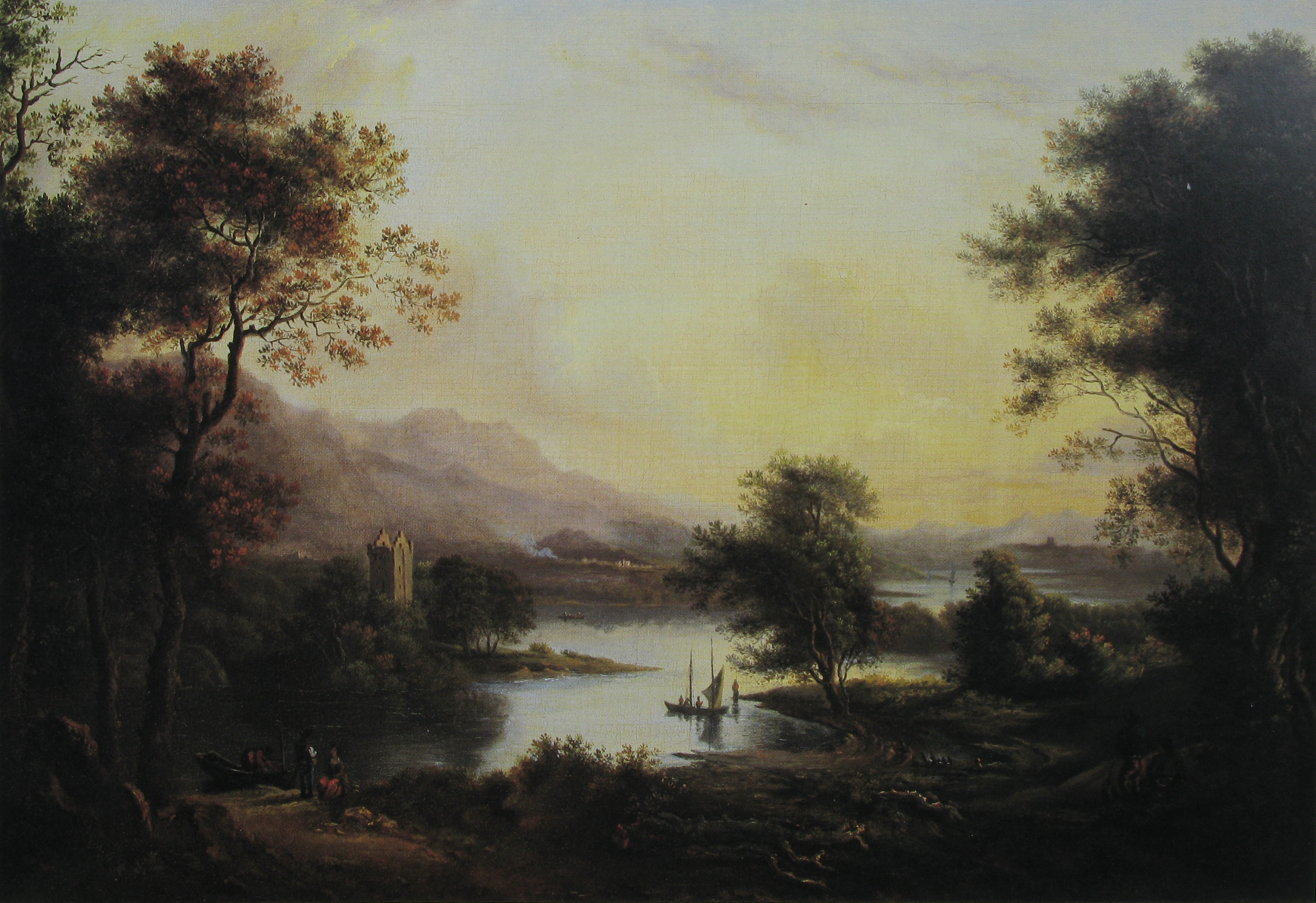
Highland Loch Landscape by Alexander Nasmyth

The effect of Romanticism can also be seen in the works of late eighteenth and early nineteenth-century artists including Henry Raeburn (1756–1823), Alexander Nasmyth (1758–1840) and John Knox (1778–1845). Raeburn was the most significant artist of the period to pursue his entire career in Scotland, born in Edinburgh and returning there after a trip to Italy in 1786. He is most famous for his intimate portraits of leading figures in Scottish life, going beyond the aristocracy to lawyers, doctors, professors, writers and ministers, adding elements of Romanticism to the tradition of Reynolds. He became a knight in 1822 and the King's painter and limner in 1823, marking a return to the post being associated with the production of art. Nasmyth visited Italy and worked in London, but returned to his native Edinburgh for most of his career. He produced work in a large range of forms, including his portrait of Romantic poet Robert Burns, which depicts him against a dramatic Scottish background, but he is chiefly remembered for his landscapes and is described in the Oxford Dictionary of Art as "the founder of the Scottish landscape tradition". The work of Knox continued the theme of landscape, directly linking it with the Romantic works of Scott and he was also among the first artists to take a major interest in depicting the urban landscape of Glasgow.

=== Nineteenth century ===
==== Painting ====
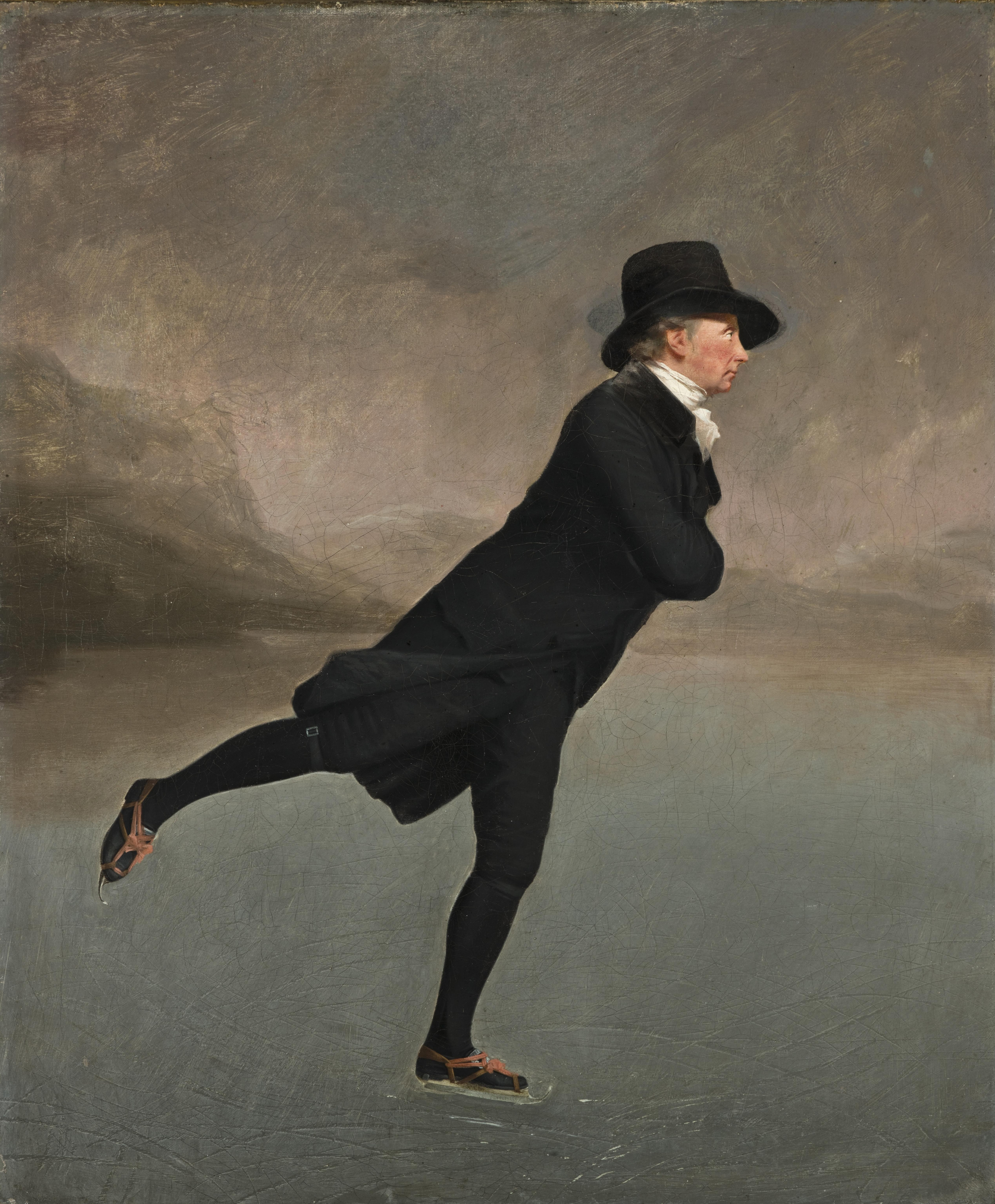
The Reverend Robert Walker Skating on Duddingston Loch, traditionally attributed to Henry Raeburn (1756–1823)

Andrew Geddes (1783–1844) and David Wilkie (1785–1841) were among the most successful portrait painters, with Wilkie succeeding Raeburn as Royal Limner in 1823. Geddes produced some landscapes, but also portraits of Scottish subjects, including Wilkie and Scott, before he finally moved to London in 1831. Wilkie worked mainly in London, and was most famous for his anecdotal paintings of Scottish and English life, including The Chelsea Pensioners reading the Waterloo Dispatch in 1822 and for his flattering painting of the King George IV in Highland dress commemorating the royal visit to Scotland in 1823 that set off the international fashion for the kilt. After a tour of Europe he was more influenced by Renaissance and Baroque painting. David Roberts (1796–1864) became known for his prolific series of detailed lithograph prints of Egypt and the Near East that he produced during the 1840s from sketches he made during long tours of the region.

The tradition of highland landscape painting was continued by figures such as Horatio McCulloch (1806–1867), Joseph Farquharson (1846–1935) and William McTaggart (1835–1910). McCulloch's images of places including Glen Coe and Loch Lomond and the Trossachs, became parlour room panoramas that helped to define popular images of Scotland. This was helped by Queen Victoria's declared affection for Scotland, signified by her adoption of Balmoral as a royal retreat. In this period a Scottish "grand tour" developed with large number of English artists, including Turner, flocking to the Highlands to paint and draw. From the 1870s Farquharson was a major figure in interpreting Scottish landscapes, specialising in snowscapes and sheep, and using a mobile heated studio in order to capture the conditions from life. In the same period McTaggart emerged as the leading Scottish landscape painter. He has been compared with John Constable and described as the "Scottish Impressionist", with free brushwork often depicting stormy seas and moving clouds. The fashion for coastal painting in the later nineteenth century led to the establishment of artist colonies in places such as Pittenweem and Crail in Fife, Cockburnspath in the Borders, Cambuskenneth near Stirling on the River Forth and Kirkcudbright in Dumfries and Galloway.

==== Sculpture ====
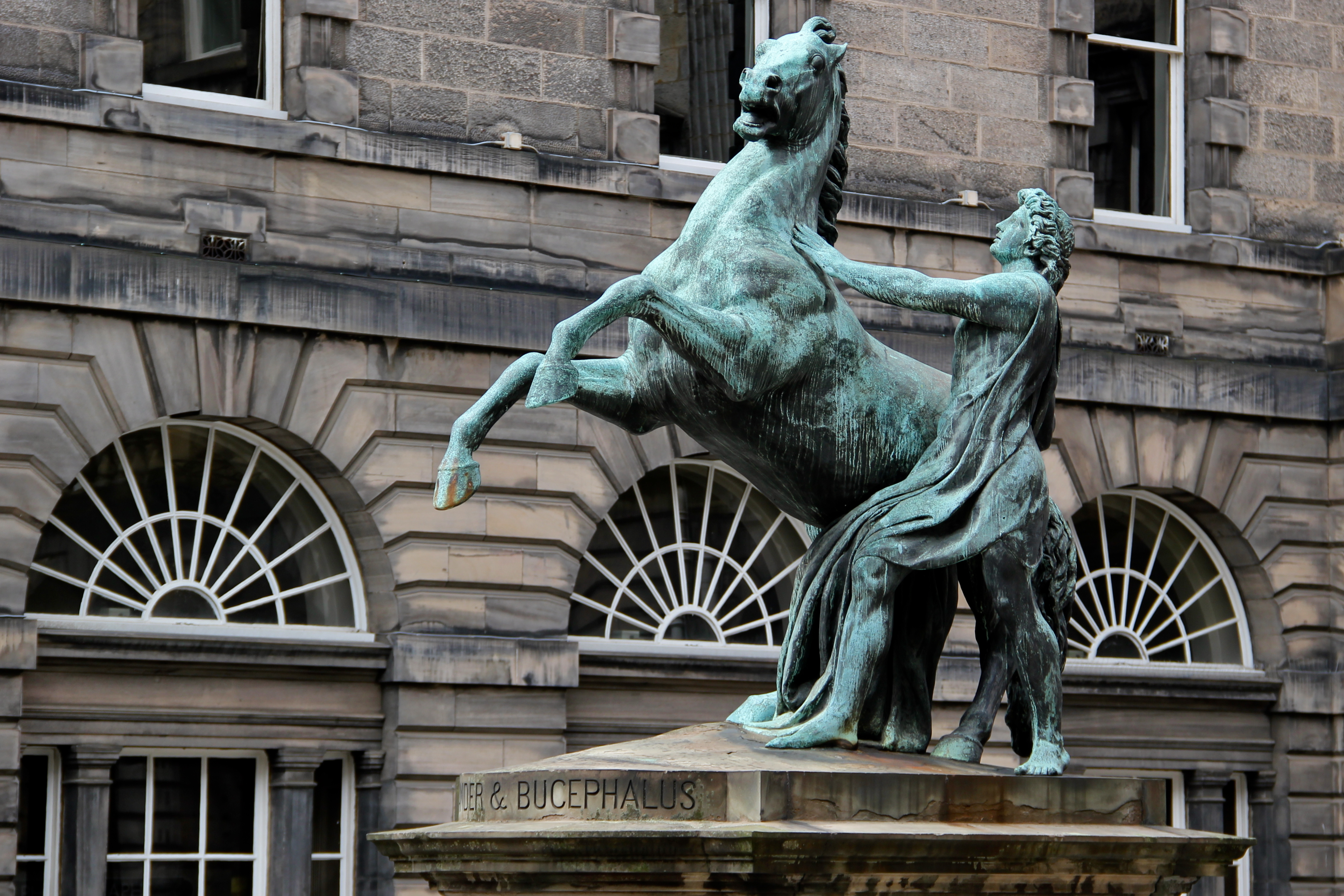
Alexander and Bucephalus by John Steell (1832)

In the early decades of the century, sculpture commissions in Scotland were often given to English artists. Thomas Campbell (c. 1790 – 1858) and Lawrence Macdonald (1799–1878) undertook work in Scotland, but worked for much of their careers in London and Rome. The first significant Scottish sculptor to pursue their career in Scotland was John Steell (1804–1891). His first work to gain significant public attention was his Alexander and Bucephasus (1832). His 1832 design for a statue of Walter Scott was incorporated into the author's memorial in Edinburgh. It marked the beginnings of a national school of sculpture based around major figures from Scottish culture and Scottish and British history. The tradition of Scottish sculpture was taken forward by artists such as Patrick Park (1811–1855), Alexander Handyside Ritchie (1804–1870) and William Calder Marshall (1813–1894). This reached fruition in the next generation of sculptors including William Brodie (1815–1881), Amelia Hill (1820–1904) and Steell's apprentice David Watson Stevenson (1842–1904). Stevenson contributed the statue of William Wallace to the exterior of the Wallace Monument and many of the busts in the gallery of heroes inside. Public sculpture was boosted by the anniversary of Burns' death in 1896. Stevenson produced a statue of the poet in Leith. Hill produced one for Dumfries. John Steell produced a statue for Central Park in New York, versions of which were made for Dundee, London and Dunedin. Statues of Burns and Scott were produced in areas of Scottish settlement, particularly in North America and Australia.

==== Early photography ====
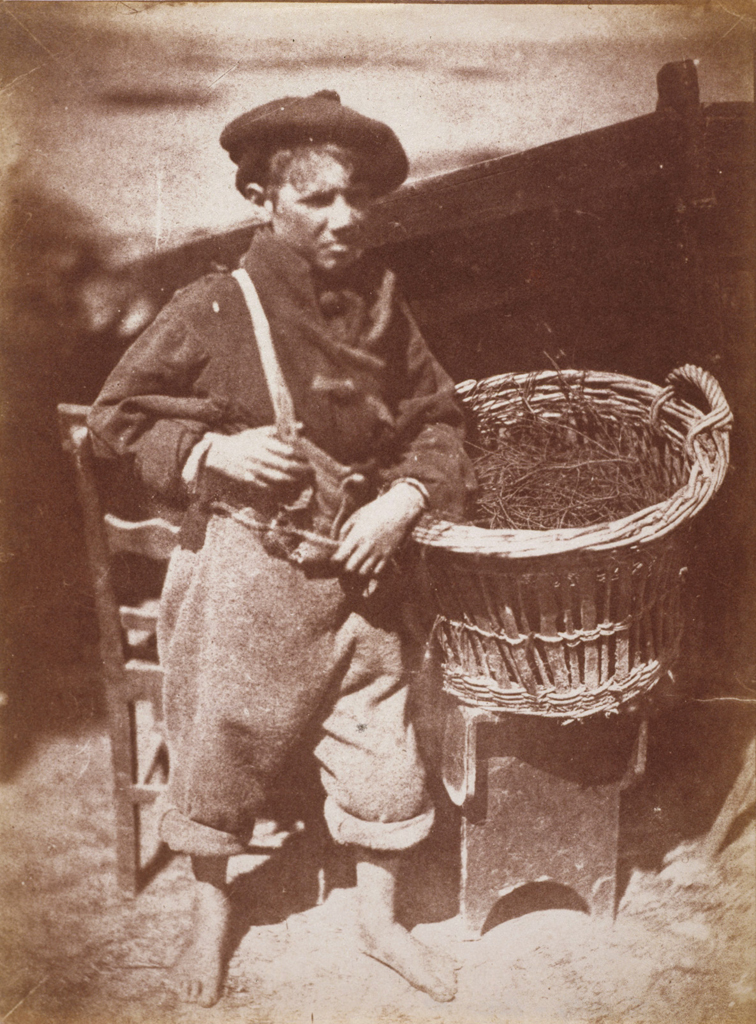
'His Faither's Breeks', by Hill & Adamson

In the early nineteenth century Scottish scientists James Clerk Maxwell and David Brewster played a major part in the development of the techniques of photography. Pioneering photographers included chemist Robert Adamson (1821–1848) and artist David Octavius Hill (1821–1848), who as Hill & Adamson formed the first photographic studio in Scotland at Rock House in Edinburgh in 1843. Their output of around 3,000 calotype images in four years are considered some of the first and finest artistic uses of photography. Other pioneers included Thomas Annan (1829–1887), who took portraits and landscapes, and whose photographs of the Glasgow slums were among the first to use the medium as a social record. His son James Craig Annan (1864–1946) popularised the work of Hill & Adamson in the US and worked with American photographic pioneer Alfred Stieglitz (1864–1946). Both pioneered the more stable photogravure process. Other important figures included Thomas Keith (1827–1895), one of the first architectural photographers, George Washington Wilson (1823–1893), who pioneered instant photography and Clementina Hawarden (1822–1865), whose posed portraits were among the first in a tradition of female photography.

==== Influence of the Pre-Raphaelites ====
David Scott's (1806–1849) most ambitious historical work was the triptych Sir William Wallace, Scottish Wars: the Spear and English War: the Bow (1843). He also produced etchings for versions of Coleridge's Ancient Mariner, Bunyan's Pilgrim's Progress and J. P. Nichol's Architecture of the Heavens (1850). Because of this early death he was known to, and admired by, the Pre-Raphaelite brotherhood mainly through his brother William Bell Scott (1811–1890), who became a close friend of founding member D. G. Rossetti. The London-based Pre-Raphaelites rejected the formalism of Mannerist painting after Raphael. Bell Scott was patronised by the Pre-Raphaelite collector James Leathart. His most famous work, Iron and Coal was one of the most popular Victorian images and one of the few to fulfill the Pre-Raphaelite ambition to depict the modern world.

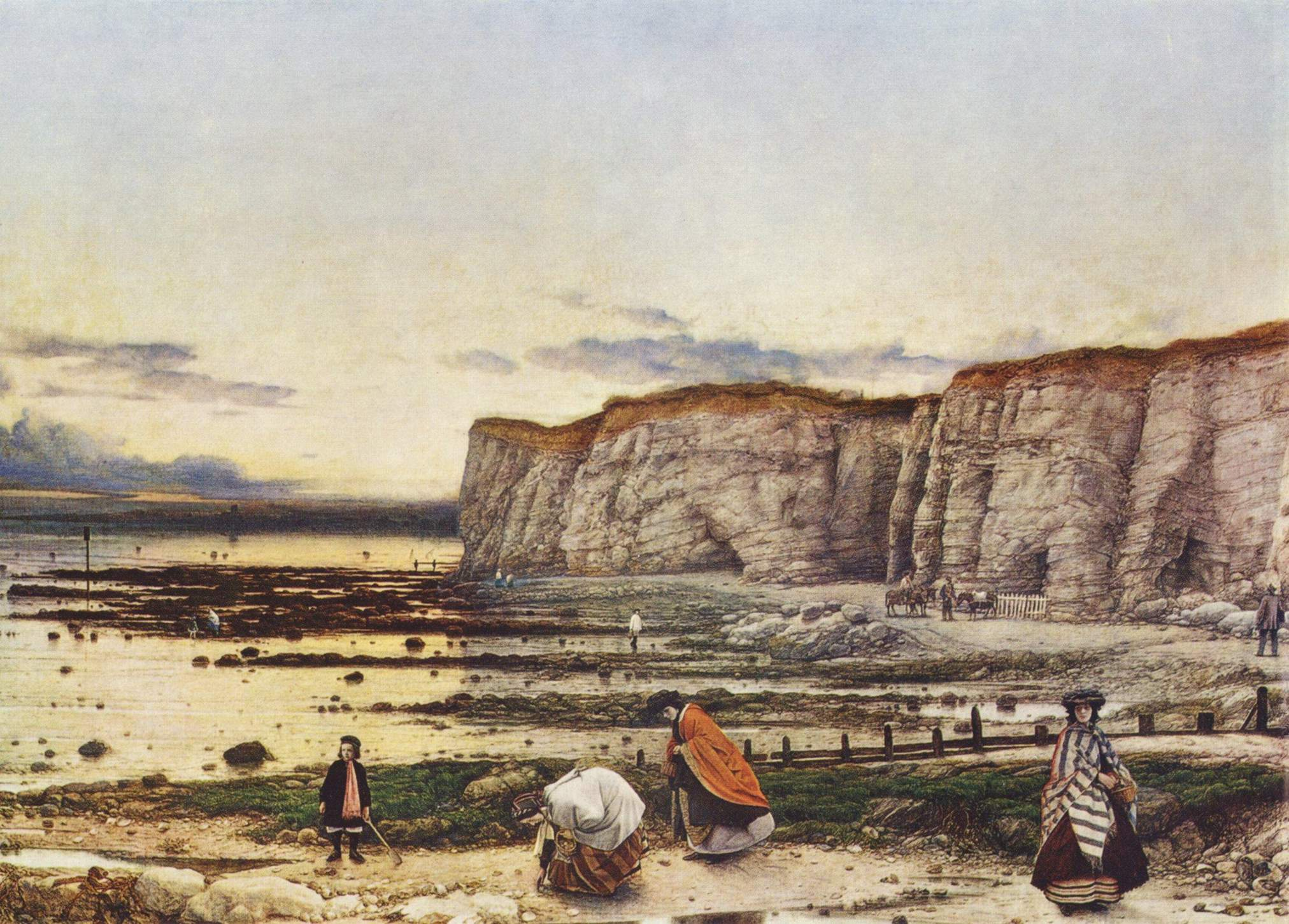
William Dyce Pegwell Bay, Kent – a Recollection of 5 October 1858 (1858–60?)

The figure in Scottish art most associated with the Pre-Raphaelites was the Aberdeen-born William Dyce (1806–64). Dyce befriended the young Pre-Raphaelites in London and introduced their work to John Ruskin. His The Man of Sorrows and David in the Wilderness (both 1860), contain a Pre-Raphaelite attention to detail, but puts the biblical subjects in a distinctly Scottish landscape, against the Pre-Raphaelite precept of truth in all things. His Pegwell Bay: a Recollection of 5 October 1858 has been described as "the archetypal pre-Raphaelite landscape". Dyce became head of the School of Design in Edinburgh, and was then invited to London, to head the newly established Government School of Design, later to become the Royal College of Art, where his ideas formed the basis of the system of training and he was highly involved in the national organisation of art. Joseph Noel Paton (1821–1901) studied at the Royal Academy schools in London, where he became a friend of John Everett Millais and he subsequently followed him into Pre-Raphaelitism, producing pictures that stressed detail and melodrama such as The Bludie Tryst (1855). Also influenced by Millias was James Archer (1823–1904) and whose work included Summertime, Gloucestershire (1860) and who from 1861 began a series of Arthurian-based paintings including La Morte d'Arthur and Sir Lancelot and Queen Guinevere.

==== Arts and Crafts and the Celtic Revival ====
The beginnings of the Arts and Crafts movement in Scotland were in the stained glass revival of the 1850s, pioneered by James Ballantine (1808–77). His major works included the great west window of Dunfermline Abbey and the scheme for St. Giles Cathedral, Edinburgh. In Glasgow it was pioneered by Daniel Cottier (1838–91), who had probably studied with Ballantine, and was directly influenced by William Morris, Ford Madox Brown and John Ruskin. His key works included the Baptism of Christ in Paisley Abbey (c. 1880). His followers included Stephen Adam and his son of the same name. The Glasgow-born designer and theorist Christopher Dresser (1834–1904) was one of the first and most important, independent designers, a pivotal figure in the Aesthetic Movement and a major contributor to the allied Anglo-Japanese movement.

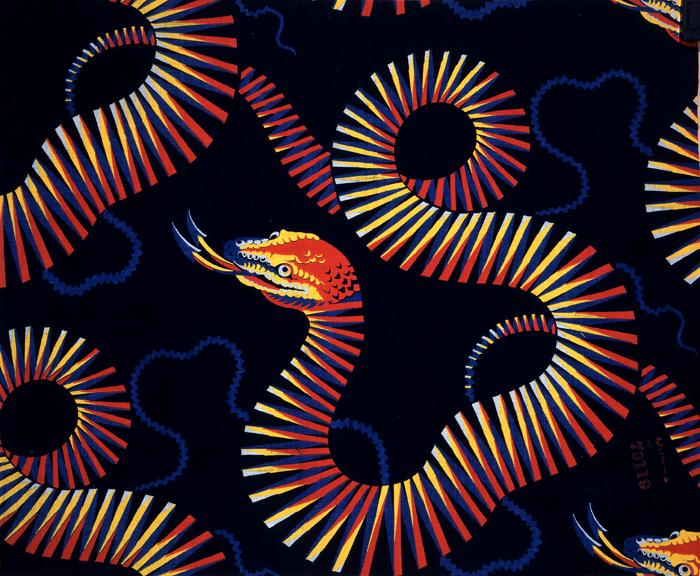
Textile pattern by Christopher Dresser (1887)

The formation of the Edinburgh Social Union in 1885, which included a number of significant figures in the Arts and Craft and Aesthetic movements, became part of an attempt to facilitate a Celtic Revival, similar to that taking place in contemporaneous Ireland, drawing on ancient myths and history to produce art in a modern idiom. Key figures were the philosopher, sociologist, town planner and writer Patrick Geddes (1854–1932), the architect and designer Robert Lorimer (1864–1929) and stained-glass artist Douglas Strachan (1875–1950). Geddes established an informal college of tenement flats for artists at Ramsay Garden on Castle Hill in Edinburgh in the 1890s.

Among the figures involved with the movement were Anna Traquair (1852–1936), who was commissioned by the Union to paint murals in the Mortuary Chapel of the Hospital for Sick Children, Edinburgh (1885–86 and 1896–98) and also worked in metal, illumination, illustration, embroidery and book binding. The most significant exponent was Dundee-born John Duncan (1866–1945), who was also influenced by Italian Renaissance art and French Symbolism. Among his most influential works are his paintings of Celtic subjects Tristan and Iseult (1912) and St Bride (1913). Other Dundee Symbolists included Stewart Carmichael (1879–1901) and George Dutch Davidson (1869–1950). Duncan was a major contributor to Geddes' magazine The Evergreen. Other major contributors included the Japanese-influenced Robert Burns (1860–1941), E. A. Hornel (1864–1933) and Duncan's student Helen Hay (fl. 1895–1953).

==== Glasgow School ====
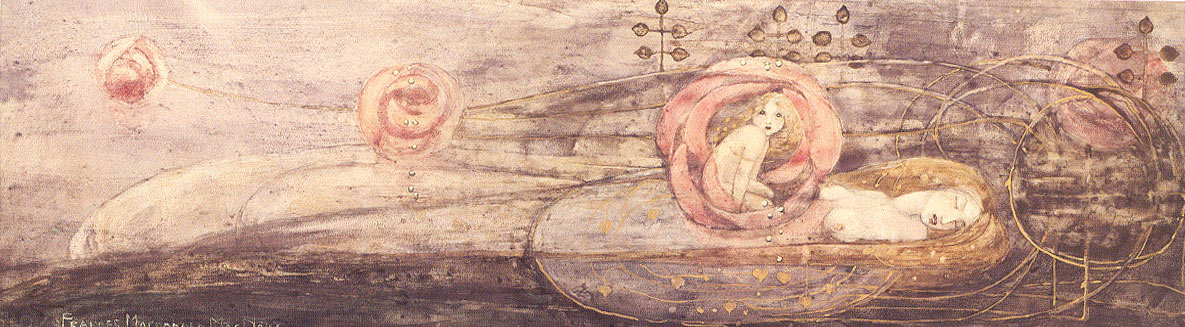
Sleeping Princess, by Frances Macdonald (1909)

For the late nineteenth century developments in Scottish art are associated with the Glasgow School, a term that is used for a number of loose groups based around the city. The first and largest group, active from about 1880, were the Glasgow Boys, including James Guthrie (1859–1930), Joseph Crawhall (1861–1913), George Henry (1858–1943) and E. A. Walton (1860–1922). They reacted against the commercialism and sentimentality of earlier artists, particularly represented by the Royal Academy, were often influenced by French painting and incorporated elements of impressionism and realism, and have been credited with rejuvenating Scottish art, making Glasgow a major cultural centre. A slightly later grouping, active from about 1890 and known as "The Four" or the "Spook School", was composed of acclaimed architect Charles Rennie Mackintosh (1868–1928), his wife the painter and glass artist Margaret MacDonald (1865–1933), her sister the artist Frances (1873–1921), and her husband, the artist and teacher Herbert MacNair (1868–1955). They produced a distinctive blend of influences, including the Celtic Revival, the Arts and Crafts Movement, and Japonisme, which found favour throughout the modern art world of continental Europe and helped define the Art Nouveau style.

=== Early twentieth century ===
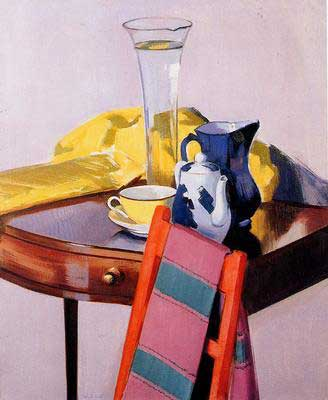
Francis Cadell, The Vase of Water (1922)

==== Scottish Colourists ====
The next significant group of artists to emerge were the Scottish Colourists in the 1920s. The name was later given to four artists who knew each other and exhibited together, but did not form a cohesive group. All had spent time in France between 1900 and 1914 and all looked to Paris, particularly to the Fauvists, such as Monet, Matisse and Cézanne, whose techniques they combined with the painting traditions of Scotland. They were John Duncan Fergusson (1874–1961), Francis Cadell (1883–1937), Samuel Peploe (1871–1935) and Leslie Hunter (1877–1931). They have been described as the first Scottish modern artists and were the major mechanism by which post-impressionism reached Scotland.

==== Edinburgh School ====
The group of artists connected with Edinburgh, most of whom had studied at Edinburgh College of Art during or soon after the First World War, became known as the Edinburgh School. They were influenced by French painters and the St. Ives School and their art was characterised by use of vivid and often non-naturalistic colour and the use of bold technique above form. Members included William Gillies (1898–1973), who focused on landscapes and still life, John Maxwell (1905–62) who created both landscapes and studies of imaginative subjects, Adam Bruce Thomson (1885–1976) best known for his oil and water colour landscape paintings, particularly of the Highlands and Edinburgh, William Crozier (1893–1930), whose landscapes were created with glowing colours, William Geissler (1894–1963), watercolourist of landscapes in Perthshire, East Lothian and Hampshire, William MacTaggart (1903–81), noted for his landscapes of East Lothian, France and Norway and Anne Redpath (1895–1965), best known for her two dimensional depictions of everyday objects.

==== Modernism and the Scottish Renaissance ====
Stanley Cursiter The Regatta (1913)

Patrick Geddes coined the phrase Scottish Renaissance, arguing that technological development needed to paralleled in the arts. This ideas were taken up by a new generation, led by the poet Hugh MacDiarmid who argued for a synergy between science and art, the introduction of modernism into art and the creation of a distinctive national art. These ideas were expressed in art in the inter-war period by figures including J. D. Fergusson, Stanley Cursiter (1887–1976), William McCance (1894–1970) and William Johnstone (1897–1981). Fergusson was one of the few British artists who could claim to have played a part in the creation of modernism. His interest in machine imagery can be seen in paintings such as Damaged Destroyer (1918). Cursiter was influenced by the Celtic revival, post-impressionism and Futurism, as can be seen in his Rain on Princes Street (1913) and Regatta (1913). McCance's early work was in a bold post-impressionist style, but after World War I it became increasingly abstract and influenced by vorticism, as can be seen in Women on an Elevator (1925) and The Engineer and his Wife (1925). Johnstone studied cubism, surrealism and new American art. He moved towards abstraction, attempting to utilise aspects of landscape, poetry and Celtic art. His most significant work, A Point in Time (1929–38), has been described by art historian Duncan Macmillan as "one of the most important Scottish pictures of the century".

Other artists strongly influenced by modernism included James McIntosh Patrick (1907–98) and Edward Baird (1904–49). Both trained in Glasgow, but spent most of their careers in and around their respective native cities of Dundee and Montrose. Both were influenced by surrealism and the work of Bruegel and focused on landscape, as can be seen in McIntosh Patrick's Traquair House (1938) and more overtly in Baird's The Birth of Venus (1934). Before his success in painting McIntosh Patrick first gained a reputation as an etcher. Leading figures in the field in the inter-war period included William Wilson (1905–72) and Ian Fleming (1906–94).

==== New Scottish Group ====
J. D. Fergusson, People and Sails (1910)

The longest surviving member of the Scottish Colourists, J. D. Fergusson, returned to Scotland from France in 1939, just before the outbreak of the Second World War, where he became a leading figure of a group of Glasgow artists. Members of Fergusson's group formed the New Art Club in 1940, in opposition to the established Glasgow Art Club. In 1942 they held the first exhibition of their own exhibiting society, the New Scottish Group, with Fergusson as its first president.

The group had no single style, but shared left-wing tendencies and included artists strongly influenced by trends in contemporary continental art. Painters involved included Donald Bain (1904–79), who was influenced by expressionism. William Crosbie (1915–99) was strongly influenced by surrealism. Marie de Banzie (1918–90), was influenced by expressionism and particularity post-expressionist Gauguin. Isabel Babianska (born 1920), was influenced by expressionist Chaïm Soutine. Expressionism can also be seen as an influence on the work of Millie Frood (1900–88), which included vivid colours and brushwork reminiscent of Van Gogh. Frood's urban scenes contain an element of social commentary and realism, influenced by Polish refugees Josef Herman (1911–2000), resident in Glasgow between 1940 and 1943 and Jankel Adler (1895–1949) who was in Kirkudbright from 1941 to 1943. Also influenced by Herman were husband and wife Tom MacDonald (1914–85) and Bet Low (born 1924), who with painter William Senior (born 1927) formed the Clyde Group, aimed at promoting political art. Their work included industrial and urban landscapes such as MacDonald's Transport Depot (1944–45) and Bet Low's Blochairn Steelworks (c. 1946).

== Contemporary art ==
=== Post-War artists ===
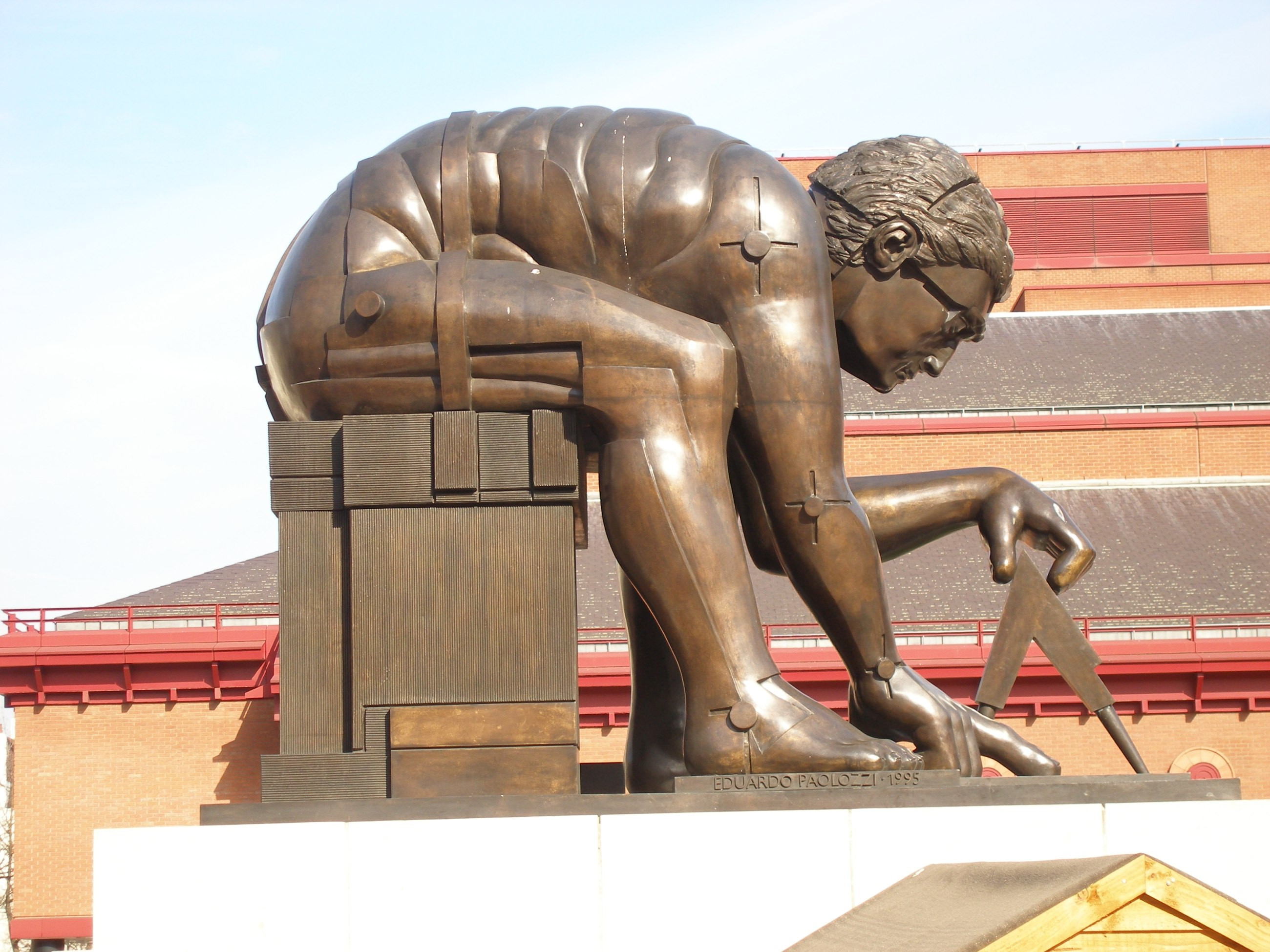
Eduardo Paolozzi's 1995 sculpture Newton, based on William Blake's 1795 print Newton

Notable post-war artists included Robin Philipson (1916–92), who was influenced by the colourists, but also pop art and neo-romanticism. Robert MacBryde (1913–66), Robert Colquhoun (1914–64) and Joan Eardley (1921–63), were all graduates of the Glasgow School of Art. MacBryde and Colquhoun were influenced by neo-romanticism and the Cubism of Adler. The English-born Eardley moved to Glasgow and explored the landscapes of Kincardineshire coast and created depictions of Glasgow tenements and children in the streets. Scottish artists that continued the tradition of landscape painting and joined the new generation of modernist artists of the highly influential St Ives School were Wilhelmina Barns-Graham (b. 1912–2004), Margaret Mellis (b. 1914–2009).

Paris continued to be a major destination for Scottish artists, with William Gear (1915–97) and Stephen Gilbert (1910–2007) encountering the linear abstract painting of the avant-garde COBRA group there in the 1940s. Their work was highly coloured and violent in execution. Also a visitor to Paris was Alan Davie (born 1920), who was influenced by jazz and Zen Buddhism and moved further into abstract expressionism. Ian Hamilton Finlay's (1925–2006) work explored the boundaries between sculpture, print making, literature (especially concrete poetry) and landscape architecture. His most ambitious work, the garden of Little Sparta opened in 1960.

=== Scottish Realism and the Glasgow Pups ===
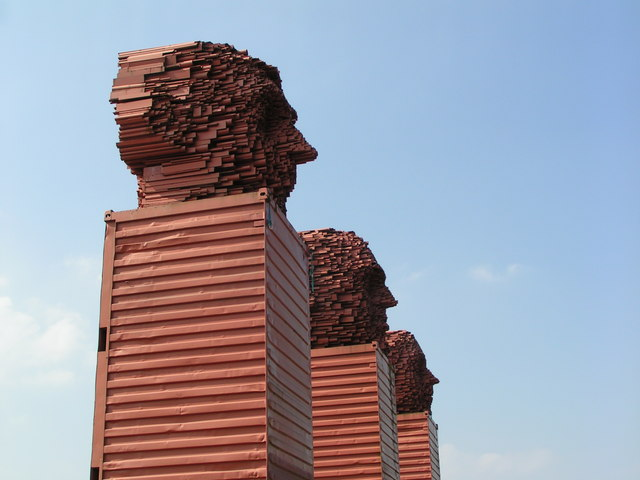
David Mach's Big Heids, Lanarkshire, a tribute to the steel industry

John Bellany (1942–2013), mainly focusing on the coastal communities of his birth, and Alexander Moffat (born 1943), who concentrated on portraiture, both grouped under the description of "Scottish realism", were among the leading Scottish intellectuals from the 1960s. The artists associated with Moffat and the Glasgow School of Art who came to prominence in the 1980s are sometimes known as the "new Glasgow Boys", or "Glasgow pups" and included Steven Campbell (1953–2007), Peter Howson (born 1958), Ken Currie (born 1960) and Adrian Wiszniewski (born 1958). Their figurative work has a comic book-like quality and puts an emphasis on social commentary. Campbell and Wiszniewski's post-modern painting adopts a whimsical approach to history. Campbell often employs figures reminiscent characters from 1930s novels confronted by the disorder and confusion of the real world, as in his Young Men in Search of Simplicity (1989). Currie has revived historical painting devoted to the socialist history of Glasgow in a series of paintings for the People's Palace in 1987. Currie also approached the problems of historical painting through his series of prints The Saracen Heads (1988).

=== Contemporary sculpture ===
While sculptors Eric Schilsky (1898–1974) and Hew Lorimer (1907–93) worked in the existing tradition of modelling and carving, sculptor and artist Eduardo Paolozzi (1924–2005) was a pioneer of pop art and in a varied career produced many works that examined juxtapositions between fantasy and the modern world. George Wyllie (1921–2012), produced works of social and political commentary including the Straw Locomotive (1987), an event which raised questions about the decline of heavy industry and the nature of colonialism. New sources of direct government arts funding encouraged greater experimentation among a new generation of sculptors that incorporated aspects of modernism, including Jake Harvey (born 1948), Doug Cocker (born 1945), Ainslie Yule (1941–2022) and Gavin Scobie (1940–2012). In contrast Sandy Stoddart (born 1959) works primarily on "nationalist" figurative sculpture in clay within the neoclassical tradition. He is best known for his civic monuments, including 10 feet (3.0 m) bronze statues of the philosophers David Hume and Adam Smith, on the Royal Mile in Edinburgh.

=== Photographic renaissance ===
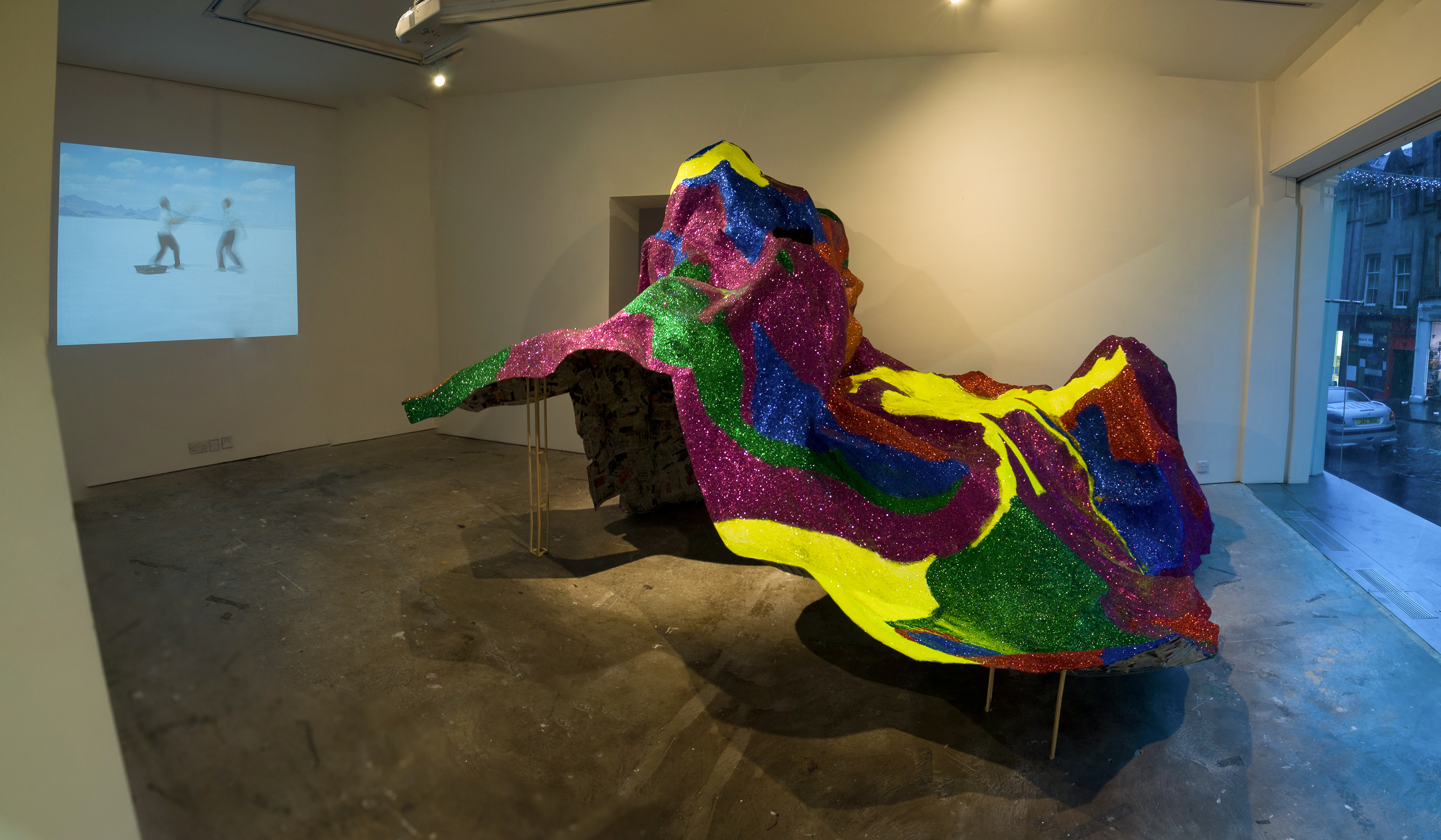
The first room of the installation The Object Moved by its Own Success, by Sandy Smith and Alex Gross (2008)

In the late twentieth century, photography in Scotland enjoyed a renaissance, encouraged by figures including Richard Hough (1945–85) who founded the Stills Gallery for photography in Edinburgh in 1977 and Murray Johnston (1949–90), who was its director (1982–86). Important practitioners in Scotland included the American Thomas Joshua Cooper (born 1946) who founded the Fine Art Photography department in 1982 at The Glasgow School of Art. More recent exponents who have received acclaim include Pradip Malde (born 1957), Maud Sulter (1960–2008) and Owen Logan (born 1963).

=== Contemporary artists ===
Since the 1990s, the most commercially successful artist has been Jack Vettriano (born 1951), whose work usually consists of figure compositions, with his most famous painting The Singing Butler (1992), often cited as the best selling print in Britain. However, he has received little acclaim from critics. Contemporary artists emerging from Glasgow and Dundee include David Mach (born 1960), working in the medium of installation art, Richard Wright (born 1960), noted for his intricate wall paintings, James Lambie (born 1964) who specialises in colourful sculptural installations and Susan Philipsz (born 1965) who works in sound installations. A group that emerged from Glasgow in the early 1990s, and later described as "The Irascibles", includes Roderick Buchanan (born 1965), who works in installations, film and photography, Douglas Gordon (born 1966) working in video art, Christine Borland (1965), whose work focuses on forensic science, and sculptor Martin Boyce (born 1967). In the generation of more recent artists Lucy McKenzie's (born 1977) painting is often sexually explicit, while Sandy Smith (born 1983) has produced installation art that combines video and landscape art.

=== Art museums and galleries ===
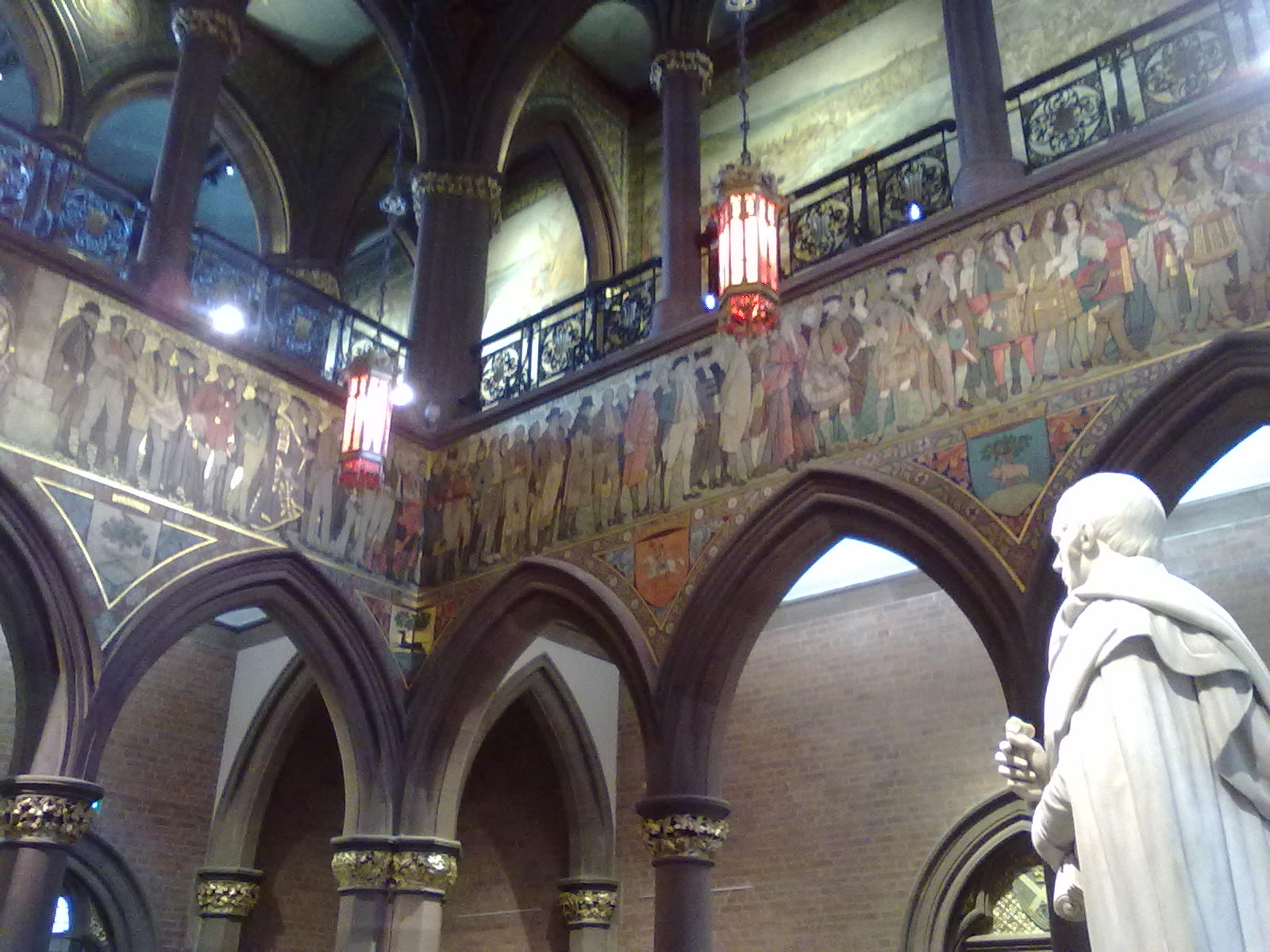
The William Hole entrance hall frieze, 1898, in the Scottish National Portrait Gallery

Major art galleries in Edinburgh include the National Gallery of Scotland, which has a collection of national and international art. The National Museum of Scotland, was formed by the merger of the Royal Museum of Scotland and the National Museum of Antiquities and includes items from the decorative arts, ethnography and archaeology. The Scottish National Portrait Gallery has portraits of major national figures. The Scottish National Gallery of Modern Art, houses the national collection of twentieth-century Scottish and international art. The Dean Gallery houses the Gallery of Modern Art's collection of Dada and Surreal art. The Talbot Rice Gallery houses both old masters and contemporary Scottish works, and the Stills Gallery is the major gallery devoted to Scottish photography. Glasgow galleries include the Burrell Collection, housing the extensive and eclectic collection of art left to the city by shipping magnate Sir William Burrell. The Kelvingrove Art Gallery and Museum houses a collection of international art and products of the Glasgow School. The Hunterian Museum and Art Gallery houses sixty works by James McNeill Whistler and works by Mackintosh, as well as an international collection of masters from the seventeenth century onwards. Other major collections include the Aberdeen Art Gallery, which houses a major collection of British and international art and Dundee Contemporary Arts, which houses two contemporary art galleries.

=== Art schools and colleges ===
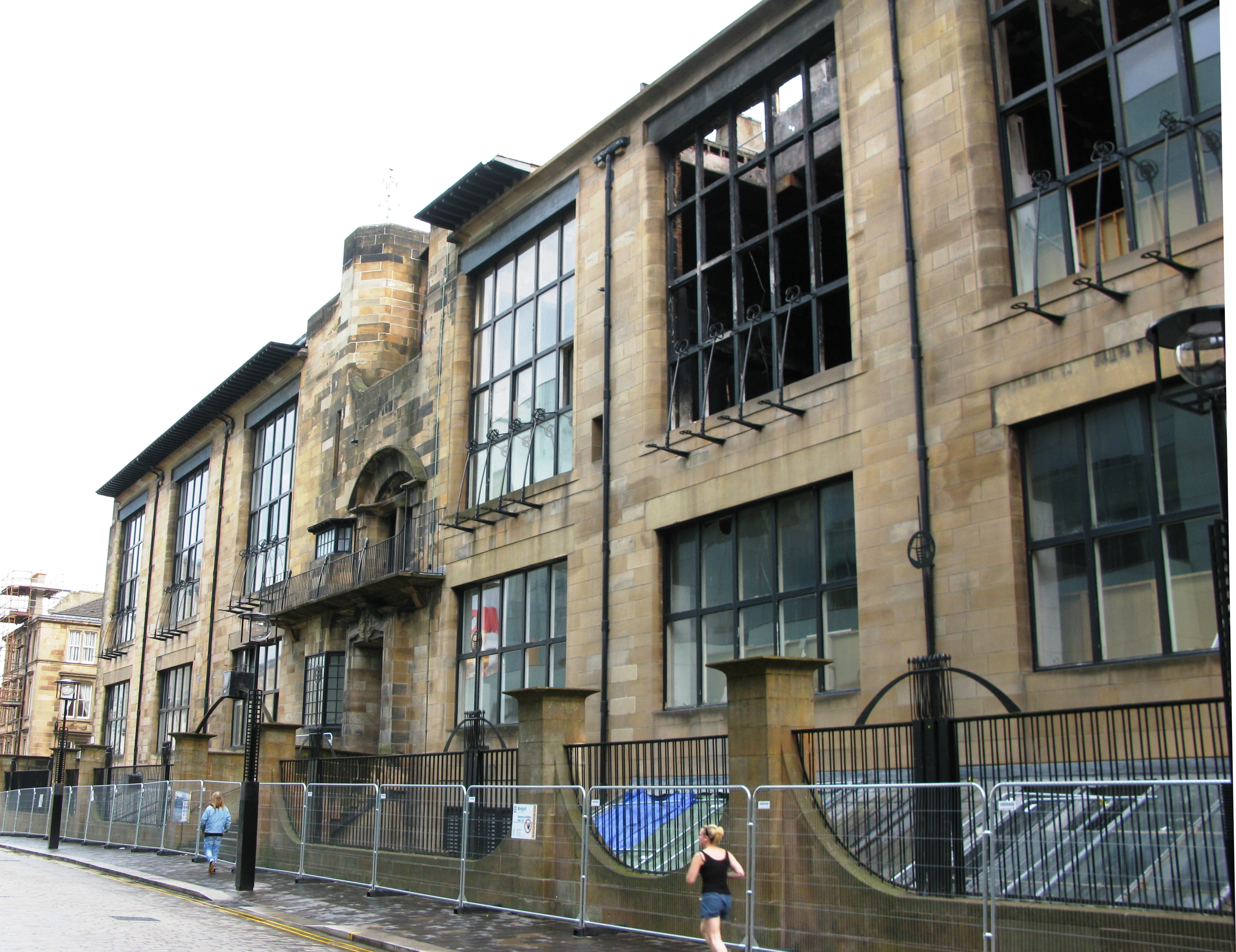
Glasgow School of Art, designed by Charles Rennie Mackintosh

Scotland has had schools of art since the eighteenth century, many of which continue to exist in different forms today. Edinburgh College of Art developed from the Trustees Academy founded in the city in 1760 and was established in 1907. After a long independent history, in 2011 it became part of the University of Edinburgh. Glasgow School of Art grew from the city's School of Design, founded in 1845. Grays School of Art in Aberdeen was founded in 1885. Duncan of Jordanstone College of Art and Design was founded in Dundee in 1909. There are also smaller private institutions such as the Leith School of Art founded in a former Lutheran church in 1988.

=== Organisations ===
Creative Scotland is the national agency for the development of the arts in Scotland. It superseded the Scottish Arts Council, which was formed in 1994 following a restructuring of the Arts Council of Great Britain, but had existed as an autonomous body since a royal charter of 1967. In addition, some local authorities and private interests have also supported to the arts, although this has been more limited since local government reorganisation in 1996. Independent arts foundations that promote the visual arts include the Royal Scottish Academy, founded in 1826 and granted a royal charter in 1837.

== See also ==
- Art of the United Kingdom
