= Scottish art in the eighteenth century =

Scottish visual art

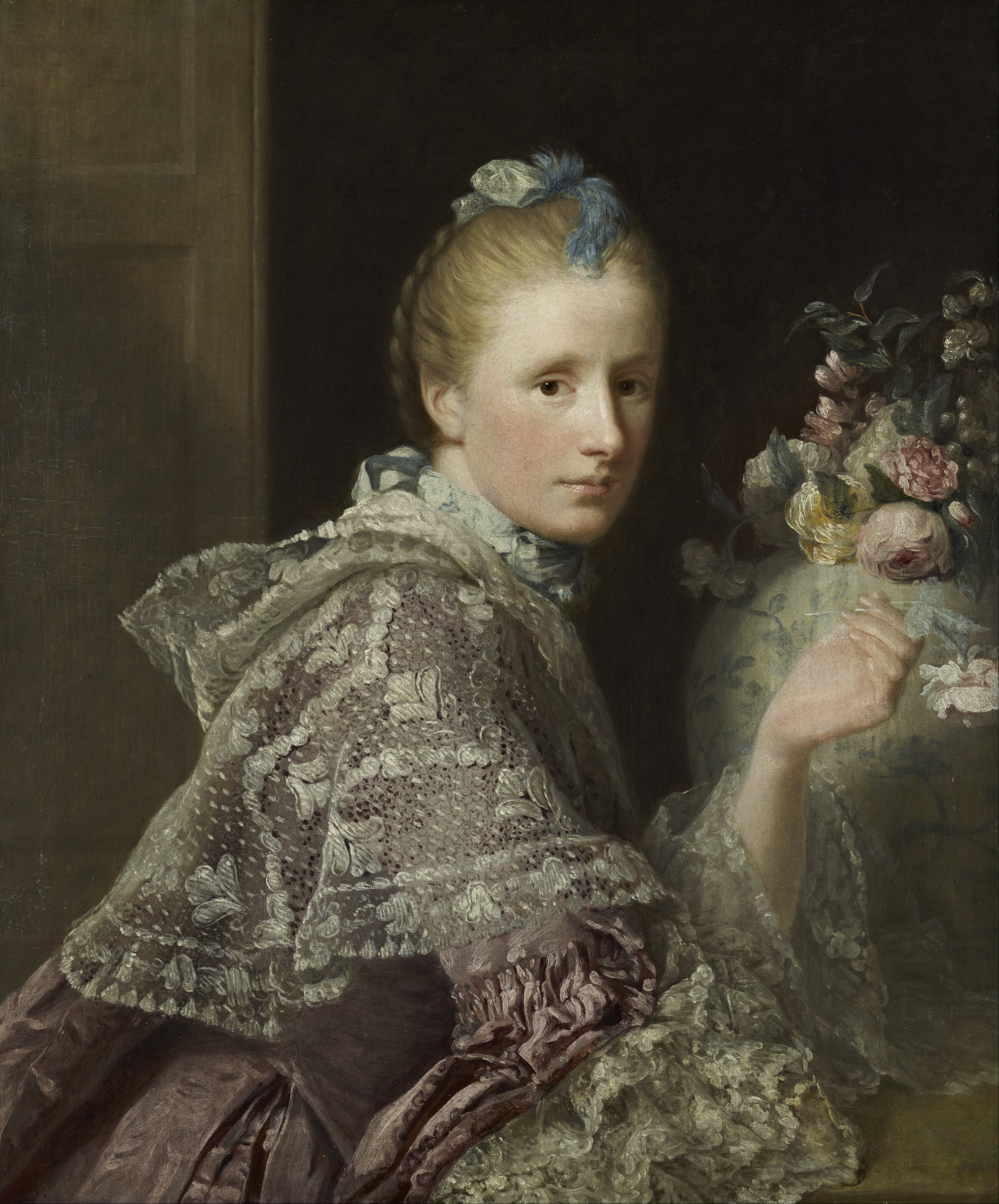
The intimate portrait of his second wife Margaret Lindsay by Allan Ramsay, 1758

Scottish art in the eighteenth century is the body of visual art made in Scotland, by Scots, or about Scottish subjects, in the eighteenth century. This period saw development of professionalisation, with art academies were established in Edinburgh and Glasgow. Art was increasingly influenced by Neoclassicism, the Enlightenment and towards the end of the century by Romanticism, with Italy becoming a major centre of Scottish art.

The origins of the tradition of Scottish landscape painting are in the capriccios of Italian and Dutch landscapes undertaken by James Norie and his sons. These were further developed by Jacob More, who added a romantic sensibility to the Scottish landscape. Alexander Nasmyth helped found the Scottish landscape tradition and was highly influential as a teacher in Edinburgh on the subsequent generation of artists. John Knox linked it with the Romantic, historical myth-making novels of Walter Scott and was one of the first artists to take an interest in the urban landscape of Glasgow. Aberdeen-born John Alexander and William Mossman were the leading portrait artists of the first half of the century. Allan Ramsay emerged as the leading portrait painter of the mid-century and to the royal family, noted for his intimate representations. Towards the end of the century Henry Raeburn emerged as the leading portraitist and one of the first artists to spend the majority of their career in Scotland, extending his range to leading figures of the Enlightenment and most famous for his depiction of the Skating Minister.

Neoclassicism was pioneered by Gavin Hamilton and his protégés, the brothers John and Alexander Runciman, and David Allan. Alexander Runciman pioneered historical painting and Alan helped develop genre art, both of which would be taken up by Scottish artists in the next century. After the Acts of Union in 1707 there was very little patronage for large and expensive works of art in Scotland. With the growth of civic development there was an increasing demand for public statuary and the portrait bust also became popular. Commissions of new statuary tended to be made in relatively cheap lead and even more economical painted or gilded plaster. From the late eighteenth century there are a handful of examples of work from Scottish artists.

== Background ==
=== Professionalisation ===
Many Scottish painters of the early part of the eighteenth century remained largely artisans. Roderick Chalmers' (fl. 1709–30) painting The Edinburgh Trades (1720) shows the artist himself, perhaps ironically, among the glaziers, wrights and masons of the burgh. Thomas Warrender (fl. 1673–1713) produced the Allegorical Still Life (after 1708), of a letter board that seems to be a commentary on the union of 1707, but he made his living as a house decorator, working closely with architects, including William Adam. He may have trained James Norie (1684–1757), who with his sons James (1711–36) and Robert (d. 1766), painted the houses of the peerage with Scottish landscapes that were pastiches of Italian and Dutch landscapes. They tutored many artists and have been credited with the inception of the tradition of Scottish landscape painting that would come to fruition from the late eighteenth century. The painters Allan Ramsay (1713–84), Gavin Hamilton (1723–98), the brothers John (1744–68/9) and Alexander Runciman (1736–85), Jacob More (1740–93) and David Allan (1744–96), mostly began in the tradition of the Nories, but were artists of European significance, spending considerable portions of their careers outside Scotland. Henry Raeburn (1756–1823) was the most significant artist of the period to pursue his entire career in Scotland, born in Edinburgh and returning there after a trip to Italy in 1786.

In 1729 the first academy of art in Scotland was established in the University of Edinburgh as the Academy of St. Luke, inspired by the Guilds of St. Luke across Europe and particularly the Accademia di San Luca in Rome. The President was George Marshall, a painter of still lives and portraits and the treasurer and drawing master was the engraver Richard Cooper senior (1701-1764). Its sponsors were the elder Norie, the poet Allan Ramsay and William Adam. Other members included Cooper's student Robert Strange, the two younger Nories, the portrait painters John Alexander (c. 1690-c. 1733) and Allan Ramsay, son of the poet (1713–84). The Academy grew out of Richard Cooper's collaboration in the University of Edinburgh with the anatomist, Alexander Monro primus (1697-1767) where he and a minor artist, William Robertson (or Robinson) drew and engraved anatomical specimens for publication in the Medical Essays between 1733 and 45. The success of the group was limited somewhat by its associations with Jacobitism, with Strange printing bank notes for the rebels, but critically it provided facilities for drawing from the life, in Monro's anatomy classroom until Cooper's death in 1764. The Foulis Academy was founded in Glasgow in 1754 by the printmaking brothers Robert and Andrew Foulis, and in Edinburgh the Board of Trustees for Fisheries, Manufactures and Improvements in Scotland established the Trustees Drawing Academy in 1760, indicating that art was now part of civic life and not just aristocratic patronage.

The growing importance of art can be seen in the post of Royal Painter and Limner, created in 1702 for George Ogilvie. The duties included "drawing pictures of our [Monarch's] person or of our successors or others of our royal family for the decorment of our houses and palaces". However, from 1723 to 1823 the office was a sinecure held by members of the Abercrombie family, not necessarily connected with artistic ability.

=== Intellectual trends ===
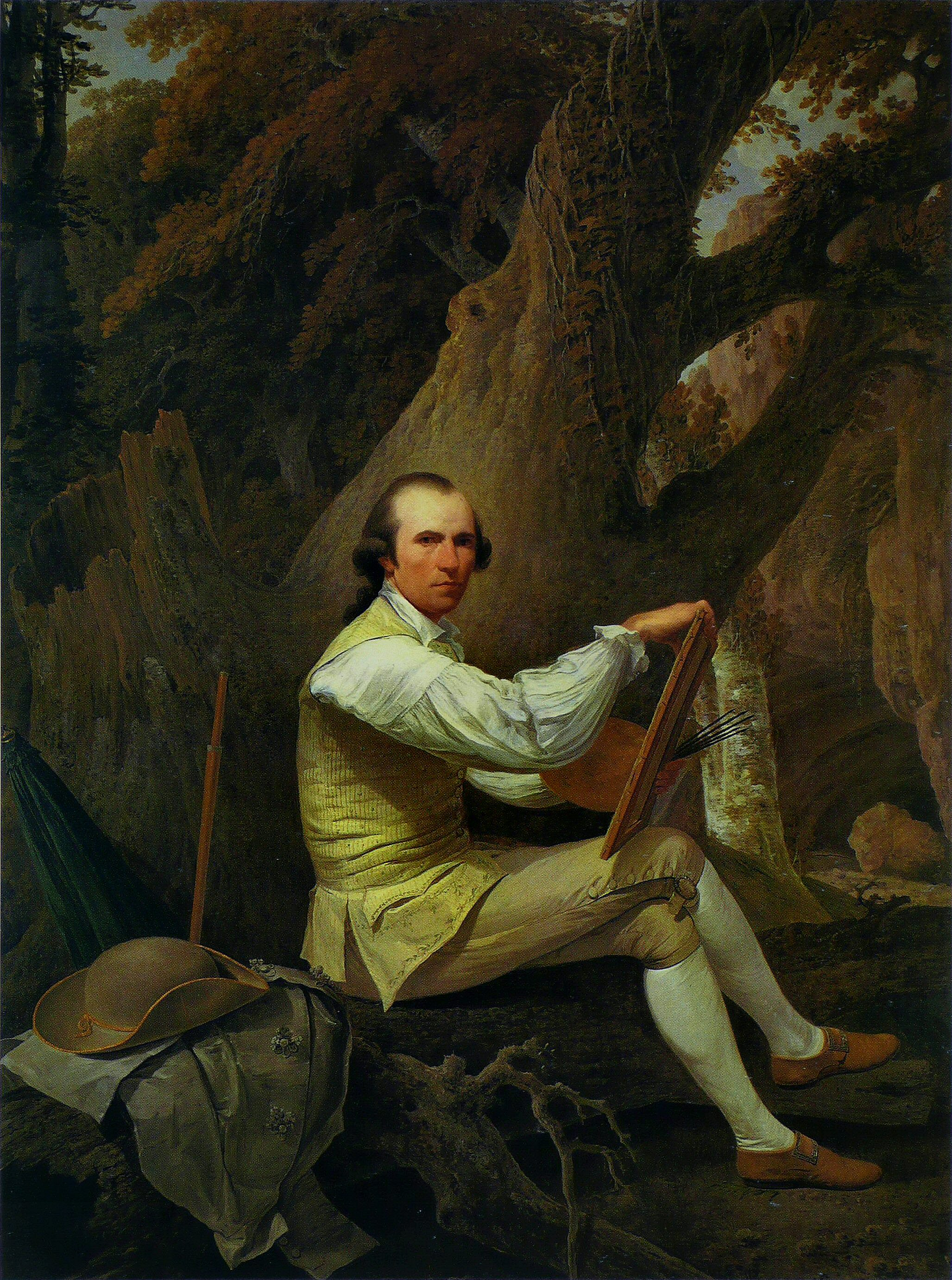
Self portrait of Jacob More

All the major painters of the period were to varying degrees influenced by forms of Neoclassicism, which revived Greek and Roman form of artistic expression. Italy became an important point of reference for Scottish artists, with over fifty artists and architects known to have travelled there in the period 1730–80 as part of a Grand Tour, to paint, sample the art and learn from Italian masters. With so many artists visiting or resident, Rome became almost a "Third Academy)" for Scots. In the second half of the century Scots became the major figures in the trade in antique sculpture, particularly Gavin Hamilton, Colin Morison (1732–1801) and James Byres (1734–1817), making them the arbiters of British taste in this area. However, the only major Scottish collection of marble before the nineteenth century was that of James Johnstone, 2nd Marquess of Annandale.

Scottish artists in the later eighteenth century were strongly influenced by the Enlightenment, which stressed rationalism and human inquiry, of which Scotland was a major centre of influence. Artists like Alan Ramsey formed The Select Society, with philosophers David Hume and Adam Smith and produced his Dialogue on Taste, which made a major contribution to the study of aesthetics. Scotland also played a major part in the origins of the Romantic movement through the publication of James Macpherson's Ossian cycle, which was proclaimed as a Celtic equivalent of the Classical epics. Fingal, written in 1762, was speedily translated into many European languages, and its deep appreciation of natural beauty and the melancholy tenderness of its treatment of the ancient legend did more than any single work to bring about the Romantic movement in European, and especially in German literature, influencing Herder and Goethe.

== Forms ==
=== Landscape ===
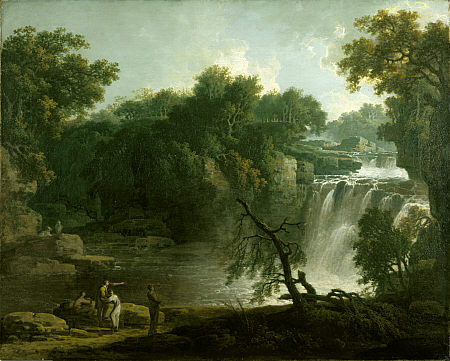
Jacob More's The Falls of Clyde: Corra Linn, c. 1771

The origins of the Scottish landscape painting tradition are in the Nories' capriccios or pastiches of Italian and Dutch landscapes. Jacob More, having trained with the Nories, moved to Italy in 1773 and is chiefly known as a landscape painter. This period saw a shift in attitudes to the Highlands and mountain landscapes in general, from viewing them as hostile, empty regions occupied by backwards and marginal people, to interpreting them as aesthetically pleasing exemplars of nature, occupied by rugged primitives, which were now depicted in a dramatic fashion. Produced before his departure to Italy, More's series of four "Falls of Clyde" (1771–73) paintings have been described by art historian Duncan Macmillan as treating the waterfalls as "a kind of natural national monument" and has been seen as an early work in developing a romantic sensibility to the Scottish landscape.

Alexander Nasmyth visited Italy and worked in London, but returned to his native Edinburgh for most of his career. He produced work in a large range of forms, including his portrait of Romantic poet Robert Burns, which depicts him against a dramatic Scottish background, but he is chiefly remembered for his landscapes and is described in the Oxford Dictionary of Art as "the founder of the Scottish landscape tradition". He was also a highly influential teacher at the Trustees Drawing Academy in Edinburgh. The work of John Knox (1778–1845) continued the theme of landscape, directly linking it with the Romantic works of Walter Scott. He was also among the first artists to take a major interest in depicting the urban landscape of Glasgow. Alexander Runciman was probably the first artist to paint Scottish landscapes in watercolours in the more romantic style that was emerging towards the end of the century.

=== Portraiture ===
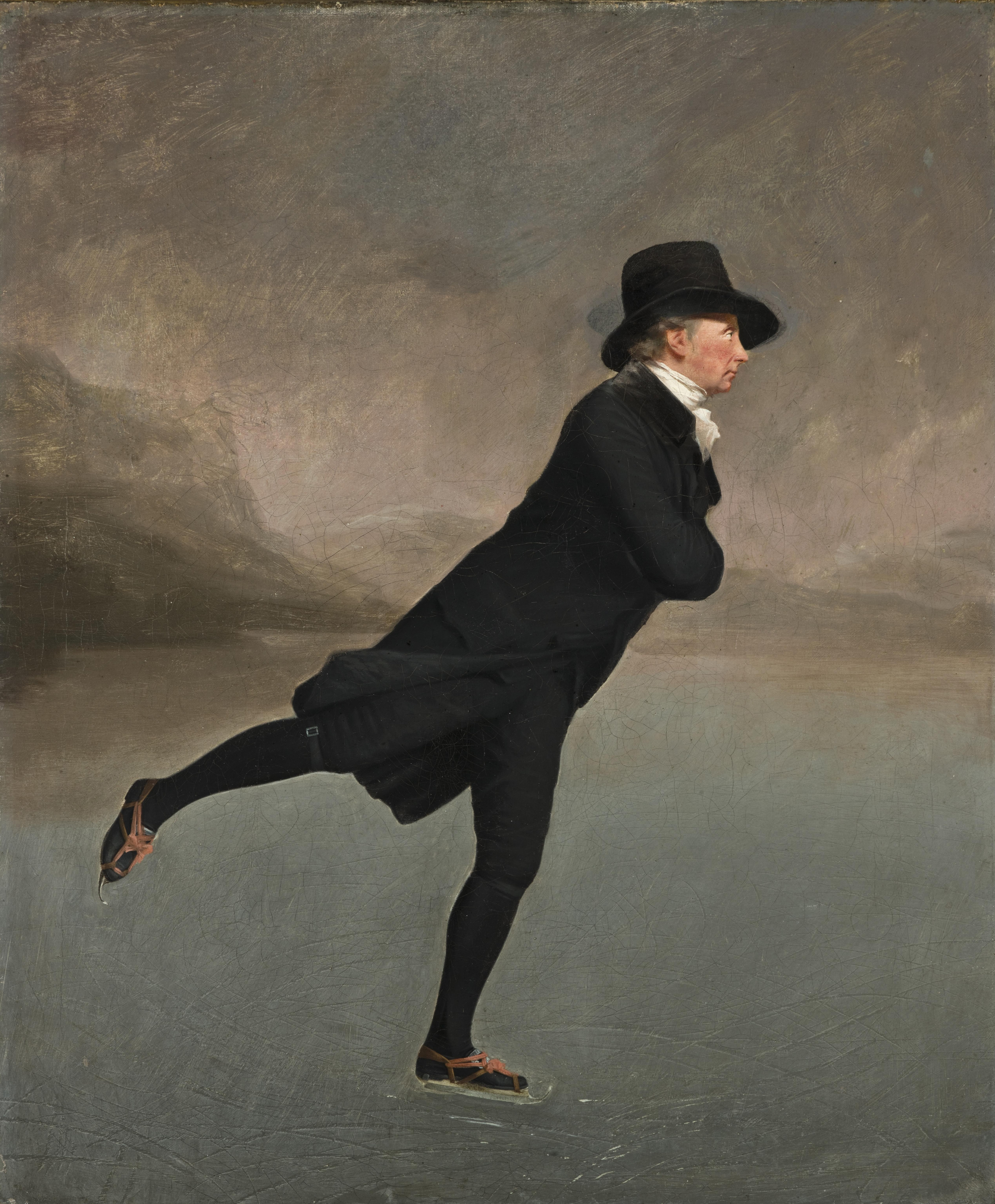
The Reverend Robert Walker Skating on Duddingston Loch, traditionally attributed to Henry Raeburn (1756–1823)

Aberdeen-born John Alexander and William Mossman were the leading portrait artists of the first half of the century. John Alexander was born in Aberdeen and was a great grandson of portrait painter George Jamesone. He studied in London and Rome, returning to Scotland about 1720. His younger contemporary William Mossman (1700–71) was also from Aberdeen and studied in Rome. Both worked predominately in the north-east around their home city, but also painted many of the figures of early-Enlightenment Edinburgh. Alexander's best known work included the portrait of George Drummond the Lord Provost of Edinburgh (1756), who had been responsible for the creation of the New Town in Edinburgh and the Royal Infirmary, which is shown in the background of the painting. Mosman's work included his portrait of John Campbell of the Bank (1749), who was chief cashier of the Royal Bank of Scotland and a Whig, but who is depicted in the recently forbidden Highland Dress. Because of his Jacobite sympathies Alexander was forced to leave for the continent after the rebellion of 1745, and in Rome he made a living painting the Jacobite expatriates who congregated there, before his return a few years later.

Allan Ramsay studied in Sweden, London and Italy before basing himself in Edinburgh, where he established himself as a leading portrait painter to the Scottish nobility and he undertook portraits of many of the major figures of the Scottish Enlightenment, including his friend the philosopher David Hume and the visiting Jean-Jacques Rousseau. After a second visit to Italy he moved to London in 1757 and from 1761 he was Principal Painter in Ordinary to George III. He now focused on royal portraits, often presented by the king to ambassadors and colonial governors. His work has been seen as anticipating the grand manner of Joshua Reynolds, but many of his early portraits, particularly of women, are less formal and more intimate studies.

The leading portrait painter of the second half of the century was Henry Raeburn (1756–1823). He was the first significant artist to pursue his entire career in Scotland. Born in Edinburgh and returning there after a trip to Italy in 1786, he is most famous for his intimate portraits of leading figures in Scottish life, going beyond the aristocracy to lawyers, doctors, professors, writers and ministers, adding elements of Romanticism to the Grand Manner tradition of Joshua Reynolds. The most famous painting attributed to him is The Reverend Robert Walker Skating on Duddingston Loch, known as The Skating Minister. He became a knight in 1822 and the King's painter and limner in 1823, marking a return to the post being associated with the production of art.

=== Neoclassism and genre painting ===
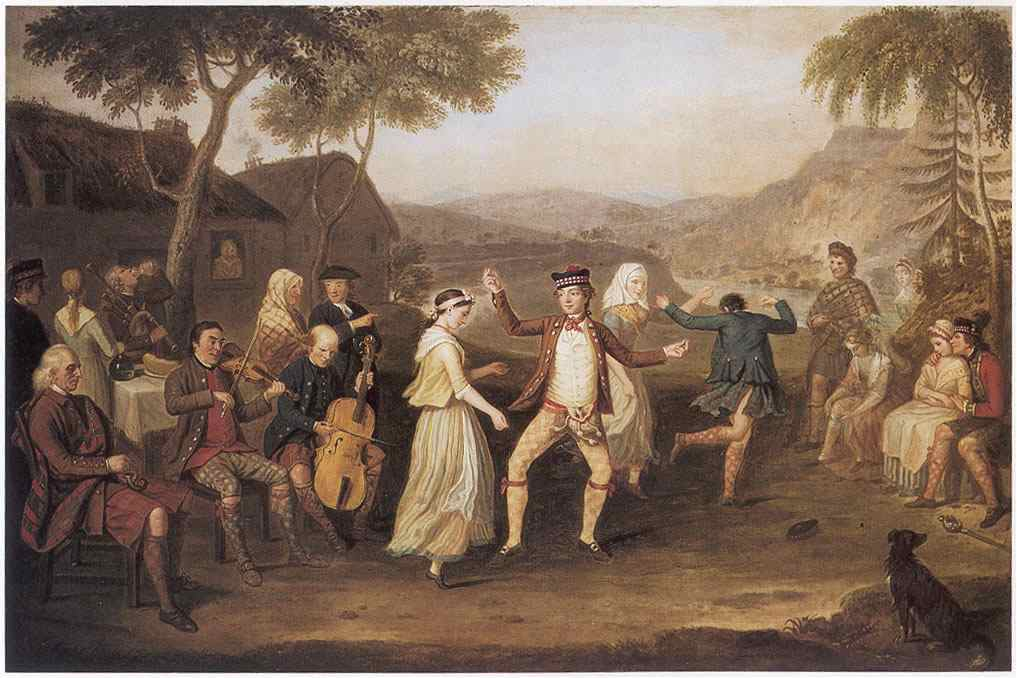
David Allan, Highland Wedding, Blair Athol (1780)

Gavin Hamilton spent almost his entire career in Italy and emerged as a pioneering neoclassical painter of historical and mythical themes, including his depictions of scenes from Homer's Iliad, as well as having been an informal tutor to British artists, early archaeologist and antiquarian. Many of his works can be seen as Enlightenment speculations about the origins of society and politics, including the Death of Lucretia (1768), an event thought to be critical to the birth of the Roman Republic. His classicism would be a major influence on French artist Jacques-Louis David (1748–1825).

John and Alexander Runciman both gained reputations as painters of mythological and historical themes. They travelled to Italy, where they worked with Hamilton. John died in 1768/9 and Alexander returned home. His most widely known work, distributed in etchings, was mythological. His version of The Origin of Painting (1773), depicting Pliny's story of a young Corinthian woman outlining a shadow on the wall, has her hand guided by Cupid, suggesting the ultimate motivation for art was love. The same theme was painted by another of Hamilton's protégés, David Allan, two years later. In the late eighteenth century Ossian became a common subject for Scottish artists, and works were undertaken by Alexander Runciman and David Allan among others.

Alexander also produced one of the earliest examples of a Scottish historical painting, showing the escape of Mary, Queen of Scots from Loch Leven Castle, which would become a major form in the nineteenth century. Allan returned to Edinburgh in 1780, became director and master of the Academy of Arts in 1786. Here he produced his most famous work, with illustrations of themes from Scottish life, earning him the title of "the Scottish Hogarth". These included Highland Wedding, Blair Athol (1780) and illustrations for the elder Allan Ramsey's Gentle Shepherd (1788). These themes would be taken up by David Wilkie (1785–1841), often noted as the founder of the British tradition of genre painting.

=== Sculpture ===
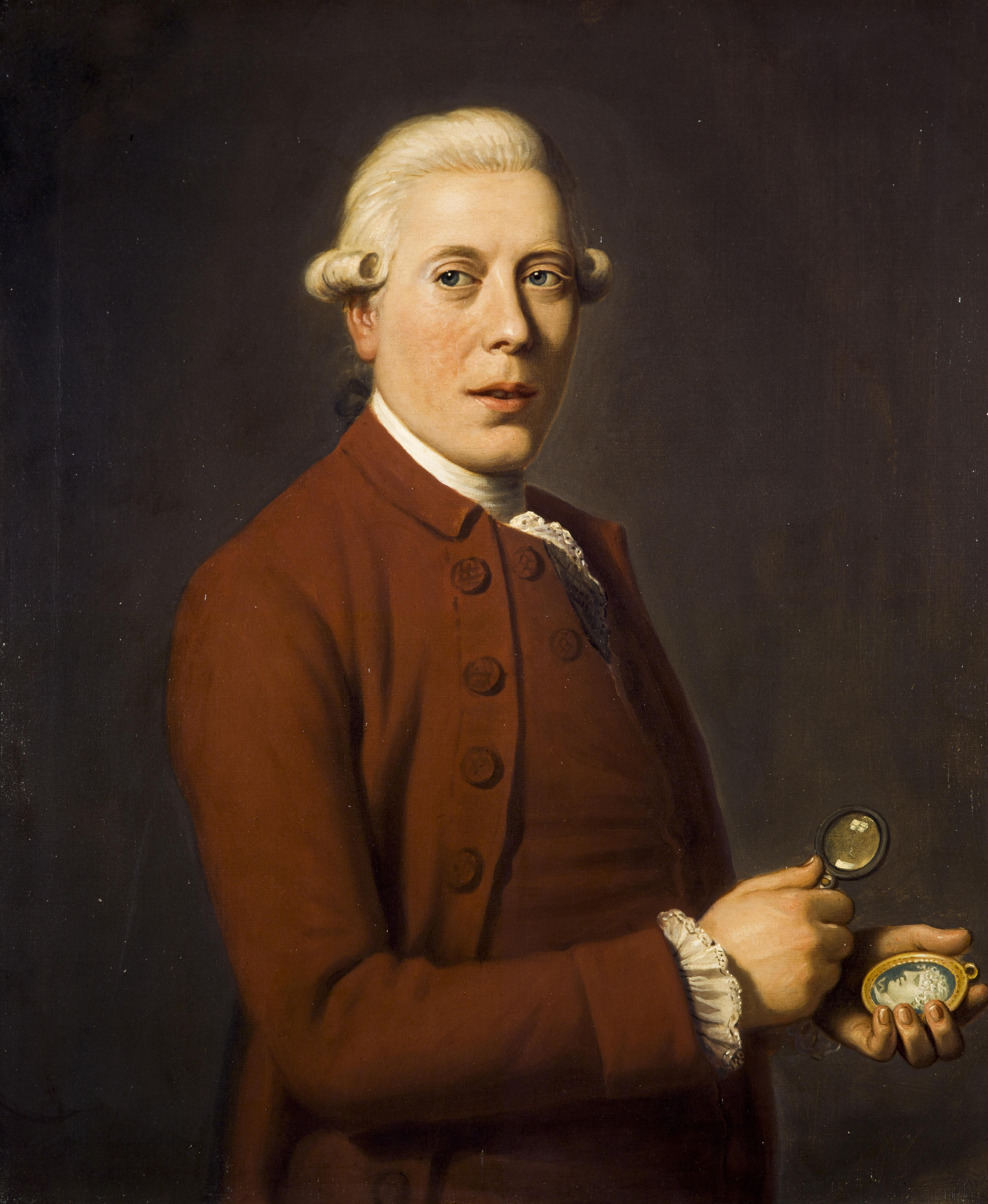
Portrait of James Tassie by David Allan, c. 1781

After the Acts of Union in 1707 the royal family spent very little time in, or money on, Scottish palaces and many Scottish nobles followed the royal court to England, tending to invest in sculpture for their residences in London, rather than their estates in Scotland. With the growth of civic development there was an increasing demand for public statuary, often with the patronage of a public institution, such as the lead figure of George II at the newly founded Royal Infirmary, Edinburgh in 1753 or the figure of the judge Duncan Forbes for the Outer Parliament House in 1752. The portrait bust, designed for interior display, also became popular. By the middle of the century statuary were preferred to painted portraits among the aristocracy.

As in England, commissions of new statuary tended to be made in relatively cheap lead and even more economical painted or gilded plaster. The plasterwork of John Cheere's yard in London was particularly in demand. Also important was the work from the yard of John Bacon (1740–99) who produced a monument for Robert Dundas (d. 1787) at Borthwick Church and one for Mrs Allardyce (d. 1787) at West Church, Aberdeen. Bacon was also a partner in Mrs Eleanor Coade's Artificial Stone Manufactory at Lambeth in London. This produced a buff coloured ceramic that could be moulded to provide fine detail, and be fired in sections, but was impervious to frost and fire. Much cheaper than carved stone, Coade stone was used for sphinxes, balustrading, capitals, coat of arms, tablets, ornamental vases, church monuments and fonts. It was used extensively by the Adam brothers, particularly in the houses they built in Scotland, such as Cullen, Banff, Culzean Castle, Ayrshire, Dunbar Castle, East Lothian, Register House, Edinburgh, Gosford House, East Lothian and Wedderburn, Berwickshire. As well as supplying sculpture, candelabra and cippi, the Adam family supplied designs to the Carron Company, founded in 1759, which produced a wide range of iron products, including stoves, safes, vases and tablets.

From the late eighteenth century there are a handful of examples of work from Scottish artists. These included statues of druids on the portico of Penicuik House carved by one "Willie Jeans" in 1776; the marble bust of James Gillespie by the obscure Robert Burn (fl. 1790–1816) and the bronze figure in Roman armour at the City Chambers, Edinburgh, which may represent Charles Edward Stuart or Louis XV. James Tassie (1735–99) was born in Glasgow and trained as a stonemason. He attended the Foulis Academy, before moving to Dublin and then London. He developed a formula for making casts in vitreous paste and manufactured casts of antique carved gems. He also produced portrait medallions and among his sitters were many leading figures in Scottish intellectual life, such as Adam Smith, David Hume and Henry Raeburn. His medallions were popular when produced in Wedgwood jasper and were used by the Carron Company to be cast in iron.
