= David Donaldson (artist) =

Scottish artist (1916–1996)

- Born: David Abercrombie Donaldson; 29 June 1916; Muirhead, Scotland
- Died: 22 August 1996 (aged 80); Glasgow, Scotland
- Awards: Guthrie Award, 1941

David Abercrombie Donaldson (29 June 1916 – 22 August 1996) was a 20th-century Scottish artist who served as official Painter and Limner to Queen Elizabeth II in Scotland, an ancient title of the Scottish Court.

== Life ==
Donaldson was born in Chryston in Lanarkshire in 1916 but raised in Coatbridge, where his family worked in the rolling mills. He attended Coatdyke Primary School and was raised in the Baptist Church.

Donaldson died during his 80th Birthday Retrospective Exhibition which was held firstly at the University of Edinburgh's Talbot Rice Gallery and then the Glasgow School of Art in August 1996. This was also the year in which he was awarded the City of Glasgow Lord Provost's Award for the Visual Arts, and his biography by W. Gordon Smith was published.
