= Sarah Lowndes =

Scottish artist

Sarah Lowndes is a writer and curator based in Norwich. Lowndes is Director of Kunsthalle Cromer and previously contributed to the Public Programme of the Sainsbury Centre at the University of East Anglia. Lowndes's research focusses upon artist-led projects, interdisciplinary and performance-related practice and contemporary art. A lecturer at Glasgow School of Art between 2002 and 2015, Lowndes has written extensively on post-war art, music and politics in Glasgow in publications including Studio 58: Women Artists in Glasgow Since World War II (Glasgow: Glasgow School of Art Exhibitions, 2012), Social Sculpture: The Rise of the Glasgow Art Scene (Luath Press, 2010) and "The Glasgow Scene", The History of British Art, Volume III (London: Tate Publishing, 2008). Other single author books authored by Lowndes include All Art is Political: Writings on Performative Art (2014), The DIY Movement in Art, Music and Publishing: Subjugated Knowledges (2016), Contemporary Artists Working Outside the City: Creative Retreat (2018) and Crowds, Community and Contagion in Contemporary Britain (2022). Lowndes co-edited Actions: The Image of the World Can Be Different, with Andrew Nairne (2018) and edited Like the Sea I Think: New Marine Writing from East Anglia (2019) and Field Work: New Nature Writing from East Anglia (2020).

Lowndes has contributed to Frieze, Art on Paper, Untitled, MAP, 2HB, Spike Art Quarterly and Afterall and to catalogues for international institutions, including Richard Wright (2009), Robert Rauschenberg: Botanical Vaudeville (2011) and Dieter Roth: Diaries (2012). Her curatorial projects include "Three Blows", a weekend of experimental acoustic performance by visual artists and musicians (2008), the symposium Subject in Process: Feminism and Art (2009) the international group exhibition Votive at CCA Glasgow (2009) and the all-women performance event Urlibido (Glasgow International 2010). Her curatorial projects include the sculpture park "Dialogue of Hands" (Glasgow International, 2012) and Studio 58: Women Artists in Glasgow Since WWII (Mackintosh Museum, 2012) and she was also the editor of art magazine The Burning Sand (2013–2016).

Lowndes is married to 2009 Turner Prize winner Richard Wright.
