= Richard Lowndes =

Richard Lowndes may refer to:

- Richard Garth née Richard Lowndes (1820–1903), Member of Parliament for Guildford (1866–1868) and Chief Justice of Bengal (1875–1886)
- Richard Lowndes (MP) (?1707–1775), of Winslow, Buckinghamshire, English politician, Member of Parliament for Buckinghamshire (1741–1774)
- Richard Lowndes (cricketer) (1821–1898), English cricketer and clergyman
- Richard Charles Lowndes MC (1888–1960), English Royal Artillery officer and influential freemason.
