= Thomas Lowndes =

Thomas Lowndes may refer to:

- Thomas Lowndes (astronomer) (1692–1748), British astronomer
- Thomas Lowndes (politician) (1766–1843), U.S. congressman from South Carolina
