= Richard Wright (artist) =

British artist

Richard Wright (born 1960) is an English artist. Wright was born in London. His family moved to Scotland when he was young. He attended Edinburgh College of Art from 1978 to 1982 and studied at Glasgow School of Art between 1993 and 1995 studying for a Master of Fine Art. He lives in Glasgow and Norfolk.

== Work ==
Wright decorates architectural spaces with intricately designed geometric patterns in paint and gold leaf. He has produced a wide range of works made on paper, from prints on poster paper to elaborate and complex large-scale works that can include thousands of hand drawn and painted marks.

Wright's paintings are often short-lived, only surviving the length of an exhibition, they are painted over at the end of the show. This often seems to heighten the senses of the viewer in the knowledge that the work may not be viewable again, in any other place, at any other time. Turner Prize judge Andrea Schlieker described him as a "painter who rejects the canvas"; fellow judge Jonathan Jones called him a "modern fresco painter". Wright injects complex works into often overlooked architectural spaces. However in recent years, Wright has installed numerous permanent works in the collections of MoMA, New York; Museum Abteiberg, Mönchengladbach; Middlesbrough Institute of Modern Art, Middlesbrough; Carnegie Museum of Art, Pittsburgh; Tate Gallery, London; Museum of Contemporary Art, San Diego, Scottish National Gallery of Modern Art, Edinburgh, Scotland, Tate Britain, London, England, Rijksmuseum, Amsterdam, Netherlands, Queen’s House, Royal Museums Greenwich, London, England and Tottenham Court Road Elizabeth Line Station, London, England.

On 7 December 2009, Wright received the Turner Prize 2009 for his golden fresco, no title, on the walls of Tate Britain's second room.

=== Exhibitions ===
The first solo exhibition of Richard's work took place in 1994 at Transmission Gallery, Glasgow, and since that time Wright has continued to exhibit worldwide.

Notable shows include:

- 1997 Pictura Britannica, Museum of Contemporary Art Australia, Sydney.
- 1998 Manifesta 2, Luxembourg.
- 2000 The British Art Show 5, Talbot Rice, Edinburgh, Scotland.
- 2001 Kunsthalle Bern and Tate Liverpool.
- 2002 Kunstverein für die Rheinlande und Westfalen (de), Düsseldorf, Germany.
- 2004 Dundee Contemporary Arts, Dundee, Scotland.
- 2007 Museum of Contemporary Art San Diego, California, United States.
- 2008 Carnegie International, Pittsburgh, United States.
- 2009 Gagosian Gallery, Davies Street, London, England.
- 2009 BQ, Berlin, Germany.
- 2010 Scottish National Gallery of Modern Art, Edinburgh, Scotland.
- 2010 The Modern Institute/Toby Webster Ltd., Glasgow, Scotland.
- 2012 Works on Paper. Kelvingrove Art Gallery and Museum, Glasgow, Scotland.
- 2013 Tate Britain, London, England.
- 2013 Theseus Temple, Kunsthistorisches Museum, Vienna, Austria.
- 2013 Rijksmuseum, Amsterdam, Netherlands.
- 2014 The Modern Institute, Aird’s Lane, Glasgow, Scotland.
- 2014 Nine Chains To The Moon. BQ, Berlin, Germany.
- 2015 Gagosian Gallery, Rome, Italy.
- 2016 Great Hall at Queen’s House, Royal Museums Greenwich, London, England.
- 2017 The Modern Institute, Aird’s Lane Bricks Space, Glasgow, Scotland.
- 2022 Tottenham Court Road station, London, England. Commissioned by Crossrail.
- 2019 Gagosian Gallery, Park & 75, New York, New York, United States.
- 2025 Apri-June, Camden Art Centre, London, England.

== Personal life ==
Wright is married to the writer Sarah Lowndes.
