= William Lowndes =

William Lowndes may refer to:

- William Lowndes (1652–1724), British politician and Secretary to the Treasury
- William Lowndes (1752-1828), British lawyer, parliamentary draftsman and Chief Commissioner of the Board of Taxes
- William Lowndes (congressman) (1782–1822), U.S. Congressman from South Carolina
- William Selby Lowndes (c. 1767–1840), British Member of Parliament
- William Thomas Lowndes (c. 1798–1843), English bibliographer, whose principal work was The Bibliographer’s Manual of English Literature
