= John Runciman =

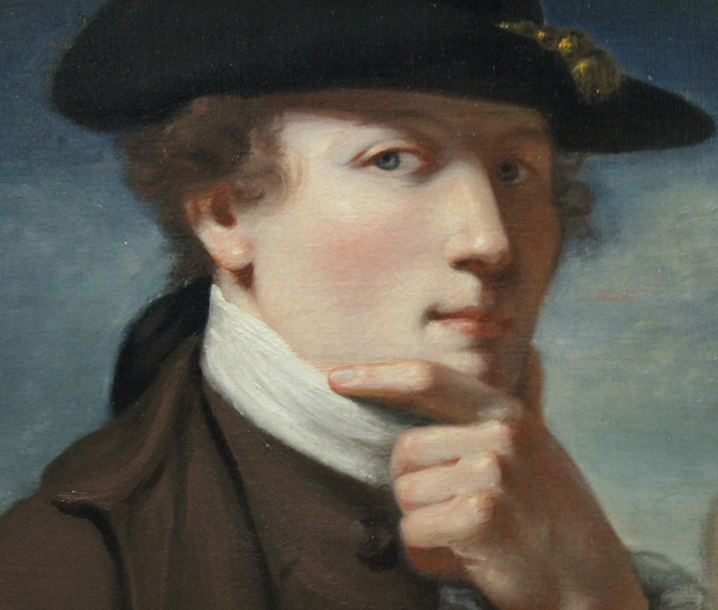
John Runciman self portrait 1767

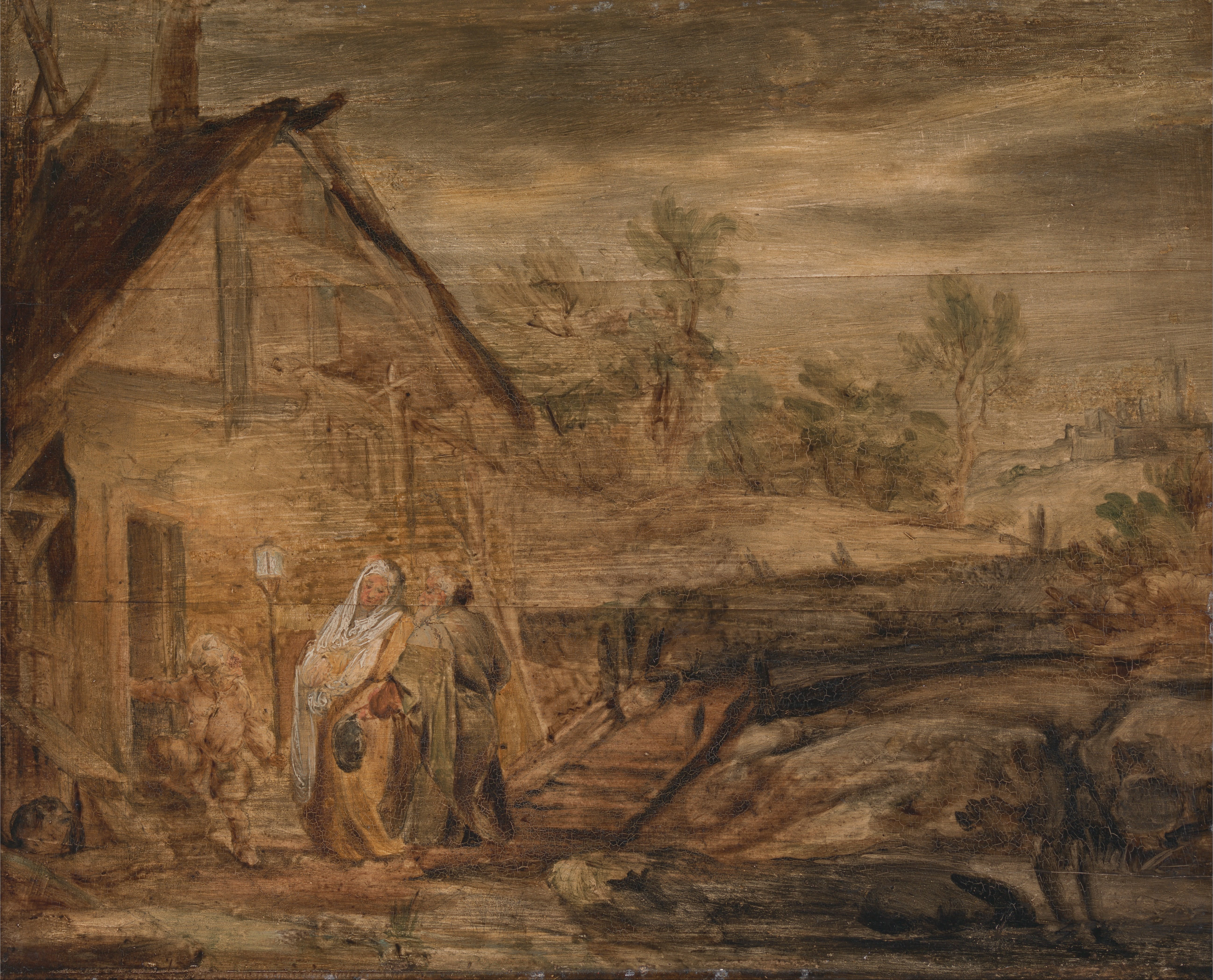
John Runciman, Mary and Joseph Outside the Inn

John Runciman (1744 – 1768 or 1769) was a Scottish painter known for Biblical and literary scenes. His works include Flight into Egypt and King Lear in the Storm, both in the National Gallery of Scotland.

== Life ==
Born in Edinburgh, Runciman was the younger brother of the better-known painter Alexander Runciman. His earliest surviving work is the 1764 etching, Taking-down of the Netherebow Port, Edinburgh, which depicts the demolition of one of Edinburgh's old city gates. In Edinburgh he produced a number of small oil paintings on religious themes, including the Flight into Egypt in the National Gallery of Scotland, which shows the influence of Rembrandt. In 1767 he produced one of his finest works, King Lear in the Storm, inspired by Shakespeare's play, which shows a tranquil king facing down a savage storm at sea. Also in 1767 he moved to London and, after a few months, to Rome, where he produced a painted Self-Portrait, the etching The Return of the Prodigal Son, and some drawings.

Runciman took ill with tuberculosis in 1768, and destroyed many of his works, partly due to harsh comments by his fellow painter James Nevay. He died in Naples in 1768 or 1769.
