= Jacob More =

Scottish painter (1740–1793)

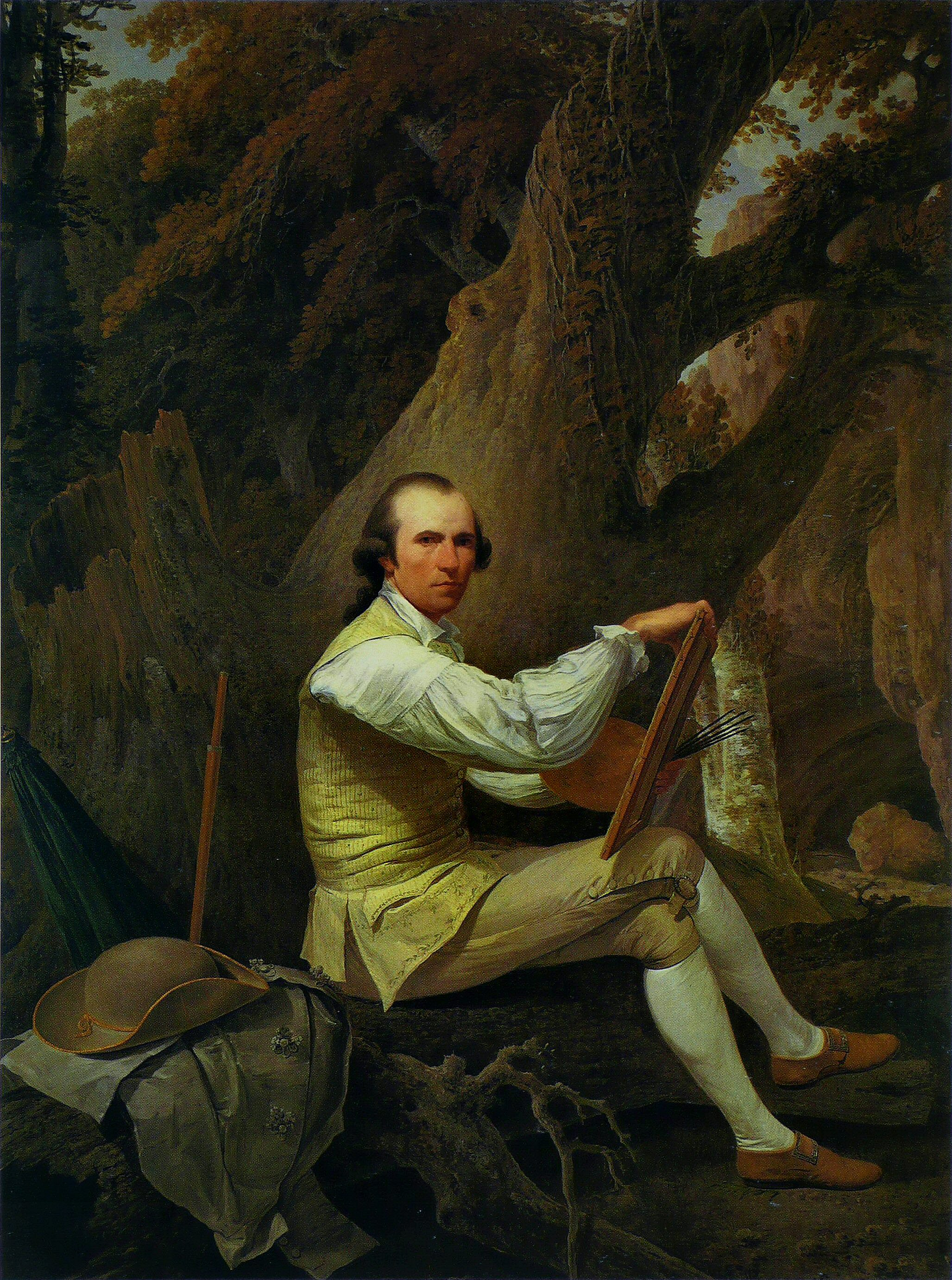
Self-portrait, 1783, Uffizi

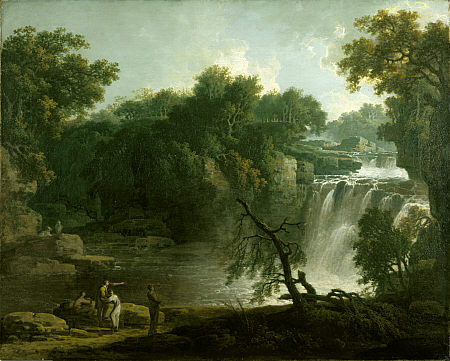
The Falls of Clyde (Corra Linn)

Jacob More (1740–1793) was a Scottish landscape painter.

== Biography ==
Jacob More was born in 1740 in Edinburgh. He studied landscape and decorative painting with James Norie's firm. He took the paintings of Gaspard Dughet and Claude Lorrain as his models.

By 1773 More had settled in Rome, and spent the rest of his life there; nevertheless, in the 1780s he managed to send Italian landscapes back to England for annual exhibitions at the Royal Academy in London. He was a close friend of Thomas Jones (1742–1803), and was one of the artists waiting at the English Coffee House for Jones's arrival in Rome in 1776.

In 1787 he was visited by Goethe, who considered his work 'admirably thought out'. He was dubbed the 'British Claude', and 'More of Rome'.

In Italy he rivalled Jacob Philipp Hackert; and he befriended Allan Ramsay (1713-1784). In Rome he enjoyed a high reputation, and was commissioned to design an 'English' garden in the grounds of the Villa Borghese.

== Some paintings on view in Britain ==
- Mount Vesuvius in Eruption: The Last Days of Pompeii (1780), National Gallery of Scotland, Edinburgh
- The Falls of Clyde (Corra Linn), National Gallery of Scotland, Edinburgh ( a painting previously owned by Sir Joshua Reynolds)
- Bonnington Lynn, Fitzwilliam Museum, Cambridge
- Falls of the Clyde, Tate gallery, London
- The Good Samaritan, McManus Gallery, Dundee
