= Painter and Limner =

Member of the Scottish royal household

The Painter and Limner is a member of the Royal Household in Scotland. Appointments of Court Painters are recorded from 1581 onwards, and the post of Painter and Limner was created in 1702 for George Ogilvie. The duties included "drawing pictures of our [the Monarch's] person or of our successors or others of our royal family for the decorment of our houses and palaces". From 1723 to 1823 the office was a sinecure held by members of the Abercrombie family, not necessarily connected with artistic ability. The appointment of Sir Henry Raeburn in 1823, a few months before his death marked a return to conferring the post on a distinguished Scottish artist. He was succeeded by David Wilkie.

From 1841 until 1932, the salary attached to the office was £100. Since 1932 the appointment has been unpaid and there has been no requirement for the holder to produce works for either the monarch or the state. Until 1864 appointments were made by commission under the Privy Seal. Since 1908 appointments have been by warrant under the royal sign manual.

The post was held by Dame Elizabeth Blackadder from 2001 until her death in 2021.

== Office holders ==
Holders of the office since 1823 are:

- Henry Raeburn: 9 May 1823 – 8 July 1823
- David Wilkie: 16 July 1823 – 1 June 1841
- William Allan: 19 July 1841 – 23 February 1850
- Sir John Watson Gordon: 23 March 1850 – 1 June 1864
- Sir Joseph Noel Paton: 8 July 1864 – 26 December 1901

Office vacant 1901-1908

- Robert Gibb: 25 June 1908 – 11 February 1932
- Sir David Young Cameron: 16 June 1933 – 16 September 1945

Office vacant 1945-1948

- Stanley Cursiter: 2 August 1948 – 22 April 1976
- David Donaldson: 12 October 1977 – 22 August 1996
- Dame Elizabeth Blackadder: 2001–2021

Office vacant since 2021
