= Leonard Boden =

British portrait painter (1911–1999)

Leonard Monro Boden (31 May 1911 – 15 November 1999) was a British portrait painter.

== Biography ==
Boden was born in Greenock, in Inverclyde, Scotland, in 1911. He was educated at Malsis School in North Yorkshire before attending Sedbergh School in Cumbria. Boden's father was the co-founder of a ship furnishing company, Rowan & Boden. Boden declined to follow his two brothers, Ernest and Sydney, into the family business, and instead joined the Glasgow School of Art. Among his tutors at Glasgow were the portrait artists William Oliphant Hutchison, Francis Hodge, John D. Revel and Frederic Whiting.

It was at Glasgow that he met his wife, Margaret Tulloch, and they married in 1937. Boden and his wife later studied at Heatherley School of Fine Art in London, and worked together on illustrating books in the 1930s. Their daughter, Daphne, became a harpist, and was the first British harpist to be awarded the Premier Prix for Harp at the Brussels Royal Conservatoire. She also became a professor of harp at the Royal College of Music and the Royal Academy of Music.

Among the honours Boden received were a gold medal at the Paris Salon, and he was appointed a Freeman of the City of London, and a liveryman of the Worshipful Company of Painter-Stainers. He was the chairman of the Chelsea Arts Club in the 1960s and a vice-president of the Artists' General Benevolent Institution.

In the Second World War Boden served in intelligence and as an anti-aircraft gunner. Following the war he began to paint portraits professionally, gaining a reputation for his depictions of actors such as Alastair Sim and Donald Wolfit, and the singer Boris Christoff.

A portrait of Field Marshal Lord Milne was Boden's first large-scale commission in 1954. Later portraits of dignitaries included three Lord Mayors of London, George Pinker, and Margaret Thatcher. In the mid-1950s Pamela Green was one of his life models. Pope Pius XII was painted by Boden in 1957; it was the only portrait that Pius granted sittings for. Fourteen sittings were held by Boden with the Pope, with many at the Pontiff's summer residence in Castelgandolfo. The portrait was later hung in the Vatican.

Margaret, Boden's wife, often contributed to his portraits, with their efforts having been described as "a joint operation". Boden was upset that, unlike him, his wife was never elected a member of the Royal Society of Portrait Painters.

== Royal portraiture ==
Boden painted 19 portraits of members of the British royal family, including ten of Queen Elizabeth II and five of Prince Philip, Duke of Edinburgh.

Before painting in oil on canvas, Boden sketched his sitters in sanguine (red chalk). The subjects of his portraits often asked to buy his lifelike sketches. Boden asked for six to eight sittings of an hour and a half each for his royal portraits. His first picture of the Queen hangs alongside a portrait of Prince Philip at the Royal Military Academy in Sandhurst. Four of his portraits of the Queen were painted for government institutions in Canada. The Queen often recommended Boden if asked whether she would prefer any particular artist's depictions of her. Boden's daughter, Daphne, sometimes played the harp for the Queen while her father painted.
