= Tony Jones (arts administrator) =

Welsh arts administrator (born 1944)

Tony Jones CBE

President of the Kansas City Art Institute
- In office 2015 – 2022
- Preceded by: Jacqueline Chanda
- Succeeded by: Ruki Neuhold-Ravikumar

President of the School of the Art Institute of Chicago
- In office 1996 – 2008
- Preceded by: G. David Pollick
- Succeeded by: Wellington Reiter

Rector of the Royal College of Art
- In office 1992 – 1996
- Preceded by: Jocelyn Stevens
- Succeeded by: Christopher Frayling

President of the School of the Art Institute of Chicago
- In office 1986 – 1992
- Preceded by: Neil Hoffman
- Succeeded by: G. David Pollick

Director of the Glasgow School of Art
- In office 1980 – 1986
- Preceded by: Harry Barnes
- Succeeded by: Tom Pannell

Personal details
- Born: 3 August 1944 (age 82) Mountain Ash, Wales
- Education: Newport School of Art; Goldsmiths College; Tulane University; Texas Christian University
- Occupation: Arts administrator, art educator

Anthony Edward Jones CBE (born 3 August 1944) is a Welsh retired arts administrator and art educator who has had various postings in the UK and the US. Initially interested in sculpture, he studied art in the UK from 1962 to 1966 before going to the US on a Fulbright Scholarship, graduating from Tulane University with a Master of Fine Arts (MFA) in 1968. He then returned to the UK, where he was head of the sculpture department of the Glasgow School of Art from 1969 to 1972. After being poisoned by fumes while making a fibreglass-and-resin sculpture in 1972, he shifted his focus from sculpture to arts administration. He was chairman of the Department of Art and Art History at Texas Christian University from 1972 to 1980 and undertook his first posting as a leader of an arts institution as Director of the Glasgow School of Art from 1980 to 1986. He followed this up with his first term as President of the School of the Art Institute of Chicago (SAIC) from 1986 to 1992, a posting as Rector of the Royal College of Art in London (1992–1996, and a second posting at SAIC as President (1996–2008) and then Chancellor (2008–2011), before leading the Kansas City Art Institute as Interim President (2014–2015) and then President (2015–2022). He is particularly known for his expertise in Charles Rennie Mackintosh, Archibald Knox, and the architecture of nonconformist chapels in Wales.

== Early life and early career ==
Jones was born on 3 August 1944 in Mountain Ash in South Wales and grew up in Penygraigwen, a small hamlet on the island of Anglesey in North Wales; his family is from the nearby area of Mynydd Bodafon. Later in his childhood, he moved to Merthyr Tydfil in South wales, where he learnt English, his native language being Welsh. He came from a family of singers, though he was instead inclined to drawing as a child and had an interest in architecture stimulated by his father, who was a builder. He was orphaned aged ten and taken in by neighbors. During his childhood he enjoyed sketching the nonconformist chapels in the valley near his home; when he was in secondary school he wrote a book that was published in 1962 as A thesis and survey of the Nonconformist chapel architecture in Merthyr Tydfil, Glamorgan.

He developed an interest in art, particularly sculpture, studying painting, sculpture, and art history at Goldsmiths College in London from 1962 to 1963 and then attending the Newport School of Art in Wales, where he obtained a Bachelor with honors in Art and Design in 1966. He then attended Tulane University in New Orleans on a Fulbright Scholarship, graduating with a Master of Fine Arts (MFA) in 1968. While there he was a graduate teaching assistant at Tulane and an instructor and artist-in-residence at the nearby Loyola University New Orleans. He then spent a year living in the English Cotswolds, where he worked as a teaching fellow at the Gloucestershire College of Art in Cheltenham and an instructor at the Adult Education Centre in Stroud, before moveing to Scotland to work as a lecturer and head of the sculpture department at the Glasgow School of Art from 1969 to 1972.

From the 1960s, his art had been shown at various regional and college galleries and exhibitions. He had become known for large rugged outdoor sculptures crafted from fibreglass and resin that allowed viewers to walk and climb on them. In 1972, while applying resin to the inside of the mould of a sculpture he was making, he was overcome by toxic resin fumes and collapsed, ultimately becoming partially glued to the structure. Two Glasgow students who also had access to his studio rescued him and he was rushed to hospital where he recovered, but the incident caused him to develop an extreme allergy to fiberglass and other plastics. He stopped producing sculpture as a result, as he could not find any satisfactory substitute materials for his art, though he continued painting. He subsequently switched his career focus to arts administration.

== Administrative career ==
In 1972, Jones took up his first administrative role as chairman of the Department of Art and Art History at Texas Christian University in Fort Worth, a position he held until 1980, during which he oversaw the construction of the J. M. Moudy Visual Arts and Communications Building, designed by architect Kevin Roche. He obtained a postgraduate degree from Texas Christian University in 1978. He then moved back to Glasgow to become the director of the Glasgow School of Art (1980–1986), where he also embarked on a building program, becoming only the second person from a sculpture-related background to hold the director's role, after James Gray in the 1930s. He became a recognised authority on 19th and 20th century art history, particularly on Charles Rennie Mackintosh and Archibald Knox.

He had been planning to stay in Glasgow for ten years but in 1986 he accepted an offer to become president of the School of the Art Institute of Chicago, attracted by both the institution's international reputation as a leading art and design school and increased opportunities to see his son from a previous marriage who was living with his mother in Texas. He led the School of the Art Institute of Chicago as president twice: first from 1986 to 1992, and again from 1996 until 2008, after which he took up the newly created position of Chancellor in 2008 before retiring in 2011. Under his leadership the school added several buildings and a residence hall. During his first residency, he was involved in two high-profile controversies relating to paintings by students at the college. The first was Mirth & Girth (1988), depicting the recently deceased Chicago mayor Harold Washington in women's underclothes. The second was What Is the Proper Way to Display a U.S. Flag? (1989) by Dread Scott, in which a U.S. flag was placed on the floor and viewers had the opportunity to step on it. Commenting on the controversies, Jones said ""People have PR disasters, but you don't usually get Chernobyl and the Exxon Valdez in successive years." In 1989, he married the American photographer Patty Carroll. Between the two terms at Chicago, he served as Rector of the Royal College of Art in London from 1992 to 1996, resigning before the end of his five-year contract due to his son's long-term illness. In 2014 He came out of retirement to be appointed Interim President of the Kansas City Art Institute, becoming its president in 2015 and retiring for the second time in 2022. While leading the institute he oversaw the addition and renovation of campus buildings, capital campaigns, and an expansion of the college endowment.

== Other work ==
Jones has published several books and essays and hosted three BBC TV series, including Painting the Dragon (2000) about artists in Wales, and On the Chapel Trail (1995), a two-part TV series for HTV. His book Welsh Chapels (1984; revised 1996), about the history of the architecture of nonconformist chapels in Wales, has been described by the Chapels Heritage Society as the standard history of this subject and fueled a campaign to preserve these buildings.

== Honours ==
Jones received a CBE in the 2003 New Year Honours for "services to the promotion of British art in the USA". He is a Fellow of the Royal Society of Arts and holds several honorary doctorates. Jones Hall, a residence hall at the School of the Art Institute of Chicago, is named after him.

== Selected bibliography ==
- Jones, Anthony (1962). A thesis and survey of the Nonconformist chapel architecture in Merthyr Tydfil, Glamorgan. Central Library. OCLC 30226846.
- Jones, Anthony (1990). Charles Rennie Mackintosh. London: Studio Editions. ISBN 978-1-85170-412-5.
- Jones, Anthony (1996). Welsh Chapels. National Museum Wales. ISBN 978-0-7509-1162-7.
- Jones, Anthony (2000). Painting the Dragon. National Museum Wales. ISBN 978-0-7200-0483-0.
