= Allan Walton =

British painter

- Born: 20 October 1891; Cheadle Hulme, England
- Died: 12 September 1948 (aged 56); St. Pancras, England
- Occupation: Painter

Director of the Glasgow School of Art
- In office 1943 – 1945
- Preceded by: William Oliphant Hutchison
- Succeeded by: Henry Young Alison

Personal details
- Occupation: Artist, educationalist

Allan Walton (20 October 1891 – 12 September 1948) was a British painter. His work was featured in the painting event of the art competition at the 1948 Summer Olympics.
