= Harry Barnes (artist) =

Sir Harry Barnes

Director of the Glasgow School of Art
- In office 1964 – 1980
- Preceded by: Douglas Bliss
- Succeeded by: Tony Jones

Personal details
- Born: Harry Jefferson Barnes; April 3, 1915
- Died: May 31, 1982 (aged 67)
- Education: Glasgow School of Art
- Occupation: Artist, educationalist

Sir Harry Jefferson Barnes (3 April 1915 - 31 May 1982) was an artist; and former Director of the Glasgow School of Art. He took the post of Director in 1964.

== Life ==
Barnes was originally from Sheffield and his father was a professor at the university there.

His old teacher at Slade Art College, Randolph Schwabe, recommended him to Glasgow School of Art in 1944. Barnes had married Schwabe's daughter in 1941. Randolph Schwabe was a close friend of Charles Rennie Mackintosh and Margaret Macdonald Mackintosh, and his daughter Alice was a favourite of theirs. With Barnes ties to the school and now connection to the Mackintoshes he became versed in the School and Mackintosh's work.

He stayed at Helensburgh in Argyll.

He became a set designer for the Glasgow Grand Opera Society.

He was the Chairman of the Charles Rennie Mackintosh Society for many years.

He was given a CBE in 1971 and knighted in 1980. He retired the same year, settling in his home in Argyll.

== Art ==
He obtained a diploma in Fine Arts from Slade School of Fine Art. He taught in secondary schools before landing a job as Assistant Master at Glasgow School of Art in 1944. He settled in Scotland and stayed at the art school in Glasgow for the rest of his working life.

He exhibited his own art at the Helensburgh Art Club.

He became the first deputy director after Douglas Bliss became the Director of the Art School in 1946. Barnes had to wait under Bliss retired in 1964 to be appointed the Director of the School.

He set up the Mackintosh School of Architecture in 1965. Infrastructure was also improved with the building of the Newbery Tower, the Foulis building and the foundations of the Bourdon building.

The old diploma courses were replaced by degree courses in 1978.

== Death ==
He died on May 31, 1982 after a long illness.

His daughter Janet explained Harry Barnes influence on the Scottish art scene:

With his connections with the Scottish art scene he was behind many of the [Helensburgh] exhibitions which were held annually in addition to the member’s ones, through the Scottish Arts Council. The loan exhibitions featured the work of contemporary artists of the day, such as Joan Eardley. In the 1950s there were still many older Helensburgh residents who had connections to the previous generations of Scottish painters, such as the Glasgow Boys.

My father developed lasting friendships with some of them, including Nance Anderson and J.Arnold Fleming, and heard their stories. This led to him promoting various exhibitions of the work of such artists in Glasgow. My father is far better known as an educator and champion of the arts in Scotland and his own painting is not at all well-known, although the Anderson Trust Local Collection has one of his paintings, a study of Rhu Point.

== Scholarship ==
Glasgow School of Art offers a postgraduate scholarship called the Sir Harry Barnes Scholarship, to help with funding for one year.
