= Phyllis Dodd =

British artist (1899-1995)

- Born: 10 November 1899; Chester, Cheshire, England
- Died: 17 May 1995 (aged 95); Newcastle-upon-Tyne, England
- Occupation: Portrait painter

Phyllis Dodd (10 November 1899 – 17 May 1995) was a British portrait painter; her husband was the artist and art teacher Douglas Bliss.

== Early life ==
Dodd was born in Chester in 1899, the daughter of Charles and Harriet Dodd. An early interest in art was encouraged by her parents. In 1909 she won a Royal Drawing Society prize. She was educated at The Queen's School, Chester. In her last year at The Queen's School she gained a full certificate of the Royal Drawing Society.

== Art education ==
Dodd's mother took in paying guests in order to be able to send her to Liverpool School of Art from 1917 to 1921, where she was taught by the influential art teacher William Penn. In 1921 Dodd won a Royal Exhibition to the Royal College of Art from 1921 to 1925. She won the Drawing Prize in her final year.

== Career ==
Sir William Rothenstein was the principal throughout Dodd's time at the Royal College of Art, and she obtained portrait commissions through him. From 1925 to 1930 Dodd taught at Walthamstow Technical College.

Dodd and her husband, Douglas Percy Bliss, exhibited together at Derby Art Gallery in 1946, and at St Michael's Gallery in Derby in 1983. She also exhibited at the NEAC, the Royal Academy, the RP, the Walker Art Gallery, and the RSA. Retrospectives were held at the Hatton Gallery at Newcastle University in 1989, and, in the year of her death, at Derby Art Gallery and Newport Museum & Art Gallery.

== Selection of work ==
There are works by Dodd held in the collections of Gonville and Caius College, Cambridge, Christ's College, Cambridge, Ashmolean Museum, Oxford, Leicester Museum & Art Gallery, and the Glasgow School of Art. Dodd's portrait of the librarian at the Glasgow School of Art, Adam Gowans, was lost in the 2014 fire.

In 2014, Nicola Sturgeon chose a drawing by Dodd for her Christmas card as First Minister.

A portrait by Dodd of Tirzah Garwood was exhibited in the latter's retrospective at Dulwich Picture Gallery in 2025.

== Personal life ==
Dodd married the Scottish artist Douglas Bliss in 1928 at Chester Cathedral. They had two daughters, Prudence and Rosalind. Prudence became an art historian, and Rosalind an artist.

Dodd and Bliss are buried together in the churchyard at All Saints' Church, Turnditch, Derbyshire; Dodd had designed and made an altar frontal for the church.
