= Tom Inns =

Director of the Glasgow School of Art
- In office 2013 – 2018
- Preceded by: Seona Reid
- Succeeded by: Irene McAra-McWilliam

Personal details
- Born: 1965 (age 60–61)
- Education: University of Bristol, Imperial College, Royal College of Art, Brunel University
- Occupation: Industrial design, educationalist

Professor Tom Inns (born October 1965) was Director of the Glasgow School of Art between 2013 and 2018.

== Education ==
He studied engineering at the University of Bristol, and then design at the Royal College of Art, Imperial College London and Brunel University.

== Career ==
Inns was Dean of Duncan of Jordanstone College of Art and Design in Dundee.

He replaced Seona Reid as Director of Glasgow School of Art in 2013.

During Inns time as a Director, the iconic Mackintosh building of the School of Art suffered two fires. The first was in 2014, the second in 2018. Six months after the second fire, Inns stood down from the role.

He was replaced by Irene McAra-McWilliam.

He is now a visiting professor at Department of Design, Manufacturing & Engineering Management at the University of Strathclyde.

== Books ==
He is the author of a series of books on Designing for the 21st Century.
