= Henry Young Alison =

Director of the Glasgow School of Art
- In office 1945 – 1946
- Preceded by: Allan Walton
- Succeeded by: Douglas Bliss

Personal details
- Born: September 21, 1889
- Died: March 9, 1972 (aged 82)
- Education: Glasgow School of Art
- Occupation: Artist, educationalist

Henry Young Alison (21 September 1889 - 9 March 1972) was an artist; and former Director of the Glasgow School of Art. He took the post of interim Director in 1945.

== Life ==
His father was Walter Alison (born 26 July 1847), a joiner from Dysart, Fife.

His mother was Jane Brown (born c. 1852) from Dysart.

Henry Young Alison was born on 21 September 1889 in Dysart, Fife.

His brother was the artist David Alison.

He stayed at Muckbrig, Pinwherry in Ayrshire. His painting Winter at Muckbrig was given to the Glasgow School of Art but it was lost in the Mackintosh building fire in 2014.

== Art ==
He joined the staff at the Glasgow School of Art in 1928.

Alison took over as interim Director of Glasgow School of Art when Allan Walton left the role in 1945.

Alison took intimidation to extremes as it is recorded that students remembered him as a 'holy terror' or worse, 'a wee bastard'.

[He] took brusqueness to extremes and it is said that his day was not complete until he had reduced at least one female student to tears. On the plus side he had no favourites - he disliked everyone with equal intensity.

His role as the Glasgow School of Art Director was short, and even when he was replaced as Director by Douglas Bliss, he decided to retire, rather than occupy his former role or even deputy director.

His uncommunicative style found its match with a rather talkative Acting Secretary that worked alongside him.

It appears that Alison was driven into resignation by the unrelenting attentions of one Elizabeth Brown, the former Acting Secretary, who held the fort in the school office during the War, but who had become a major irritant through her habit of buttonholing people in corridors and subjecting them to endless conversations about trivia.

== Death ==
He died at the homeopathic hospital at 1000 Great Western Road in Glasgow. He had arterial degeneration and had gangrene in his hands and his right foot.

His friend and fellow artist Daisy McGlashan Anderson was the informant on the death certificate.

== Works ==
His self portrait is in the National Gallery of Scotland.
