= Bill Buchanan (arts administrator) =

Director of the Glasgow School of Art
- In office 1989 – 1990
- Preceded by: Tom Pannell
- Succeeded by: John Whiteman

Personal details
- Born: October 7, 1932
- Died: September 4, 2018 (aged 85)
- Education: Glasgow School of Art
- Occupation: Artist, educationalist

William Menzies Buchanan (7 October 1932 - 4 September 2018) was a Scottish art administrator, art historian, and former Director of the Glasgow School of Art. He was interim director from 1989 to 1990.

== Life ==
William Menzies Buchanan was born in Trinidad in 1932. He studied at Glasgow School of Art.

He married Elspeth and they had four children: Andy, Aji, Gavin and Janie. The marriage did not last and Buchanan remarried Alison.

Alison and Bill lived at Allan Water, eight miles south from Hawick. However Alison died from breast cancer.

He then moved to Edinburgh and later partnered with Ann until his death.

== Art ==
He joined the Scottish Arts Council in 1961.

He became Head of the Department of Fine Arts at Glasgow School of Art in 1977. He contributed to many publications on the history of photography.

He expanded the Fine Arts syllabus at the School.

In 1989 he was made the interim Director of Glasgow School of Art, taking over from Tom Pannell.

He negotiated with St. Andrew's House a major investment with the Mackintosh building. He also edited the book Mackintosh's Masterwork in 1989, the standard work on the building.

He was replaced by John Whiteman.

== Books ==
Along with Mackintosh's Masterworks, Buchanan also wrote a book on the pioneering Scottish photographer James Craig Annan; The Art of the Photographer.
