= Douglas Bliss =

Scottish painter and art conservationist

Director of the Glasgow School of Art
- In office 1946 – 1964
- Preceded by: Henry Young Alison
- Succeeded by: Harry Barnes

Personal details
- Born: 28 January 1900
- Died: 11 March 1984 (aged 84)
- Education: Glasgow School of Art
- Occupation: Artist, educationalist

Douglas Percy Bliss (28 January 1900 – 11 March 1984; Urdu: ڈگلس پرسی بلیس) was a Scottish painter and art conservationist. Bliss's family was of Northamptonshire, England. His grandfather moved to Moray, Scotland. Bliss himself was born in Karachi, India (but now in Pakistan). Bliss was raised in Edinburgh and educated at George Watson's College from 1906–17. He always regarded himself as Scottish.

Gunhills, Windley, 1946–52, Tate Gallery.

Bliss left school in 1917 to join the Highland Light Infantry until the end of World War I. In 1922 he was awarded an M.A. in English Literature by the University of Edinburgh. He had studied Art History in his first year. Bliss then studied painting at the Royal College of Art in London. In his postgraduate year he studied engraving. In 1925 the Oxford University Press published his engravings illustrating Border ballads. Bliss then received a number of commissions, including a commission to write A History of Wood Engraving. This work received such critical acclaim that Bliss’ reputation as an artist was overshadowed by his reputation as a critic and teacher.

In 1928 Bliss married Phyllis Dodd, who was a painter. Encouraged by his wife Bliss took up painting again, painting oil and watercolour landscapes in Scotland and England. Coincidentally his paintings record the end of an era of small-holding. He also painted some urban scenes just before the towns were transformed by high rise and high-density buildings.

In the 1930s Bliss established the Blackheath Society, which continues today to attempt to protect the amenity of life in south-east London. In the 1930s he taught at the Blackheath School of Art and was the London art critic for The Scotsman. In 1941 Bliss joined the RAF and was stationed in Scotland. After the war, the war he was appointed Director of the Glasgow School of Art. He referred to Glasgow as "the greatest industrial city in the Empire". Bliss was instrumental in saving much of the Art Nouveau architecture and furniture of Charles Rennie Mackintosh. He continued as Director from 1946 until 1964. When he completed his period as Director, Glasgow School of Art was listed by Whitaker's Almanack among the six top Art Schools in Britain.

Bliss's own art was exhibited around Britain. There was an exhibition of his work in the Glasgow School of Art, in the northern hemisphere summer of 1998. Much of the work of Bliss's youth has been lost. Most of his engravings were unpublished before the beginning of the War in 1939 and his entire collection was stolen during the Blitz. Decades later sixteen degraded blocks were identified at an auction. Most split when printing was attempted.

== Work in public collections ==
- Cardiff: National Museum of Wales
- The Contemporary Art Society
- Edinburgh: Gallery of Modern Art
- Glasgow: City Art Gallery
- Leamington Art Gallery
- London: The British Museum
- Manchester Education Authority
- National Arts Collection Fund
- Perth City Art Gallery
- The Tate Gallery
- Victoria & Albert Museum

== Publications ==
- 1925 Border Ballads (illustrations); OUP
- 1926 The History of Rasselas, Prince of Abyssinia by Dr. Samuel Johnson, introduction by G.K. Chesterton (illustrations); J. M. Dent London
- 1928 The Spanish Lady & two other stories by Cervantes (illustrations); OUP
- 1928 A History of Wood Engraving; J. M. Dent
- 1929 The Palace of Pleasure by William Painter (illustrations); Cresset Press London
- 1934 The Devil in Scotland (introductory text & illustrations); Maclehose London
- 1938 Some Tales of Mystery & Imagination by E. A. Poe; Penguin Books
- 1952 Memoirs of Prince Alexei Haimatoff by T. J. Hogg (illustrations); Folio Society London
- 1979 Edward Bawden (a biography); The Pendomer Press Godalming
