= Irene McAra-McWilliam =

Director of the Glasgow School of Art
- In office 2018 – 2020
- Preceded by: Tom Inns
- Succeeded by: Penny Macbeth

Personal details
- Education: Glasgow School of Art
- Occupation: Artist, educationalist

Irene Helen McAra-McWilliam, OBE is a design researcher and academic, specialising in design innovation. She was the interim Director of the Glasgow School of Art from November 2018 to May 2020, having been head of its School of Design from 2005. She stood down from the role in 2020, becoming deputy director. Penny Macbeth became the new Director following her.

Before moving to Glasgow, she was Professor and Business Fellow in Innovation at the Royal College of Art, and Professor of Design Research at Eindhoven University of Technology.

== Honours ==
In the 2016 New Year Honours, she was appointed an Officer of the Order of the British Empire (OBE) "for services to art and design".
