= Dugald Cameron =

Dugald Cameron OBE, FCSD, FRSA

Director of the Glasgow School of Art
- In office 1991 – 1999
- Preceded by: John Whiteman
- Succeeded by: Seona Reid

Personal details
- Born: 1939 (age 86–87)
- Education: Glasgow School of Art
- Occupation: Artist, Industrial Design, Educationalist

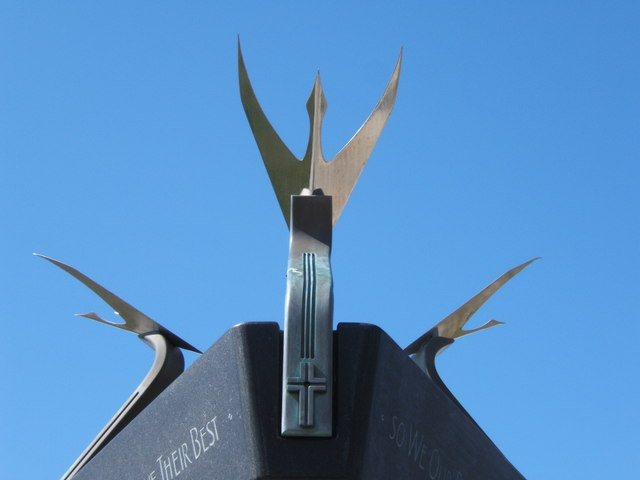
Detail of War Memorial south of Nasg

Dugald Cameron (born 1939) is a Scottish artist and industrial designer.

Cameron was born in Glasgow in 1939 and raised near Clydebank, attending the High School of Glasgow. He obtained both a DA and a Postgraduate Diploma from Glasgow School of Art. He subsequently worked as a freelance industrial designer, during which time he designed a prototype medical ultrasound machine, the Lund machine (aka the Sundén machine, after Bertil Sundén of Lund University, who commissioned it), and the production version, the Diasonograph, working with medical physicist Tom Brown.

He also worked as an artist, specialising in aviation subjects. As an aviation and railway historian, he has published books on both topics.

Appointed a visiting lecturer at Glasgow School of Art in 1963, he became Senior Lecturer in Product Design there in 1970, and subsequently rose to be Governor, Head of Design and finally, from 1991 to his retirement in 1999, Director.

He is an honorary professor in the Department of Aerospace Engineering at the University of Glasgow and a visiting professor at the Department of Design, Manufacturing and Engineering Management at the University of Strathclyde. He was a member of the academic advisory panel on the development of displays at Glasgow's Riverside Museum, but criticised the final arrangements, saying "The building itself and its historic setting is splendid, but I think that the exhibition, and the way it has been handled, is a bit dumbed-down. I don’t think the exhibition design is satisfactory at all - it seems to be [more] visual effect than scholarly effort. It seems to me to be an incoherent exhibition."

He was awarded the Lord Provost of Glasgow's Gold Medal for Education in 1998 and appointed an Officer of the Order of the British Empire (OBE) in the 2000 New Year Honours, "for services to Art and Design". The same year, he was made an honorary Doctor of Science by the University of Strathclyde. A Companion of the Royal Aeronautical Society, he was granted the Baird of Bute Society's aviation award in 2013. His paintings are in the collections of the National Museum of Flight, the Royal Navy Submarine Museum and the Fleet Air Arm Museum.
