= John Whiteman =

English architect (born 1934)

Director of the Glasgow School of Art
- In office 1990 – 1991
- Preceded by: Bill Buchanan
- Succeeded by: Dugald Cameron

Personal details
- Born: 1934 (age 91–92)
- Education: Glasgow School of Art
- Occupation: Architect, educationalist

John Whiteman (born 1934) is an architect who was Director of the Glasgow School of Art from 1990 to 1991.

== Life ==
Whiteman was born in England.

He is a registered architect and planner in both England and the United States.

He became a professor of architecture and urban design at the Harvard Graduate School of Design. He also became a professor at the Chicago Institute of Urban Studies.

== Art ==
In 1990 he was made the Director of Glasgow School of Art.

He got embroiled in a row with Pat Lally, the then leader of Glasgow District Council, who seemed to unliterally declare that paintings bought for the Royal Concert Hall in Glasgow would only be hung for a period of 10 months.

His arrival at the School of Art coincided with the end of Margaret Thatcher's tenure as British Prime Minister. He saw Thatcherism as causing a political run-down of the arts during the 1980s:

Britain’s higher education system has taken a bruising through the decade of Thatcherism, and Arts has been particularly discriminated against. Things seem to be changing now, and in my dealings with the Scottish Education Department I have been surprised how constructive and direct they have been. The Eighties have been a demoralising time for staff at the art school, which has made them defensive, but there is a lot of enthusiasm there.

He left the post abruptly. It transpired that Whiteman's marriage was struggling under the transatlantic distance; so Whiteman made the decision to return to the United States. The Scotsman had the story:

He was replaced by Dugald Cameron after nine months in charge of the art school.
