= Tom Pannell =

Artist

Director of the Glasgow School of Art
- In office 1986 – 1989
- Preceded by: Tony Jones
- Succeeded by: Bill Buchanan

Personal details
- Born: 5 July 1933
- Died: 22 June 2003 (aged 69)
- Education: Glasgow School of Art
- Occupation: Textile designer, educationalist

Tom Pannell (5 July 1933 – 22 June 2003) was a textile designer; and former Director of the Glasgow School of Art. He was director from 1986 to 1989.

== Life ==
Pannell was born in Romford, England. He was a graduate of the Royal College of Art.

After graduation, he worked for the Scottish firm Reid and Taylor but left in 1965 to become head of fashion and textiles at the Nottingham College of Art and Design.

== Art ==
In 1986 he was made the Director of Glasgow School of Art, taking over from Tony Jones.

It was during Pannell's tenure that the CNAA introduced minimum academic qualifications for students as a requirement for course validation UK Schools of Art. The need for objectives and five year plans and the restrictions this imposed were not for him, and he resigned from his post in 1989.

He retired to Taunton in England.

He was replaced by Bill Buchanan.

== Death ==
As reported in the Somerset County Gazette, he died on 22 June 2003 after being overwhelmed by smoke from a bonfire he had built in his own garden.

The Glasgow School of Art magazine Flow had this tribute:

It is with great sadness that we have to report the tragic death of Tom Pannell, following an accident at his home in Somerset. Tom was Director of the School from 1986 – 89. Well liked and a true gentleman, he strengthened the School’s links with the local Trades Houses and the City’s design industries and was also an active figure in the development of the Royal Society of Arts programmes north of the border.
