= Andrew Blain Baird =

Scottish blacksmith and aviation pioneer

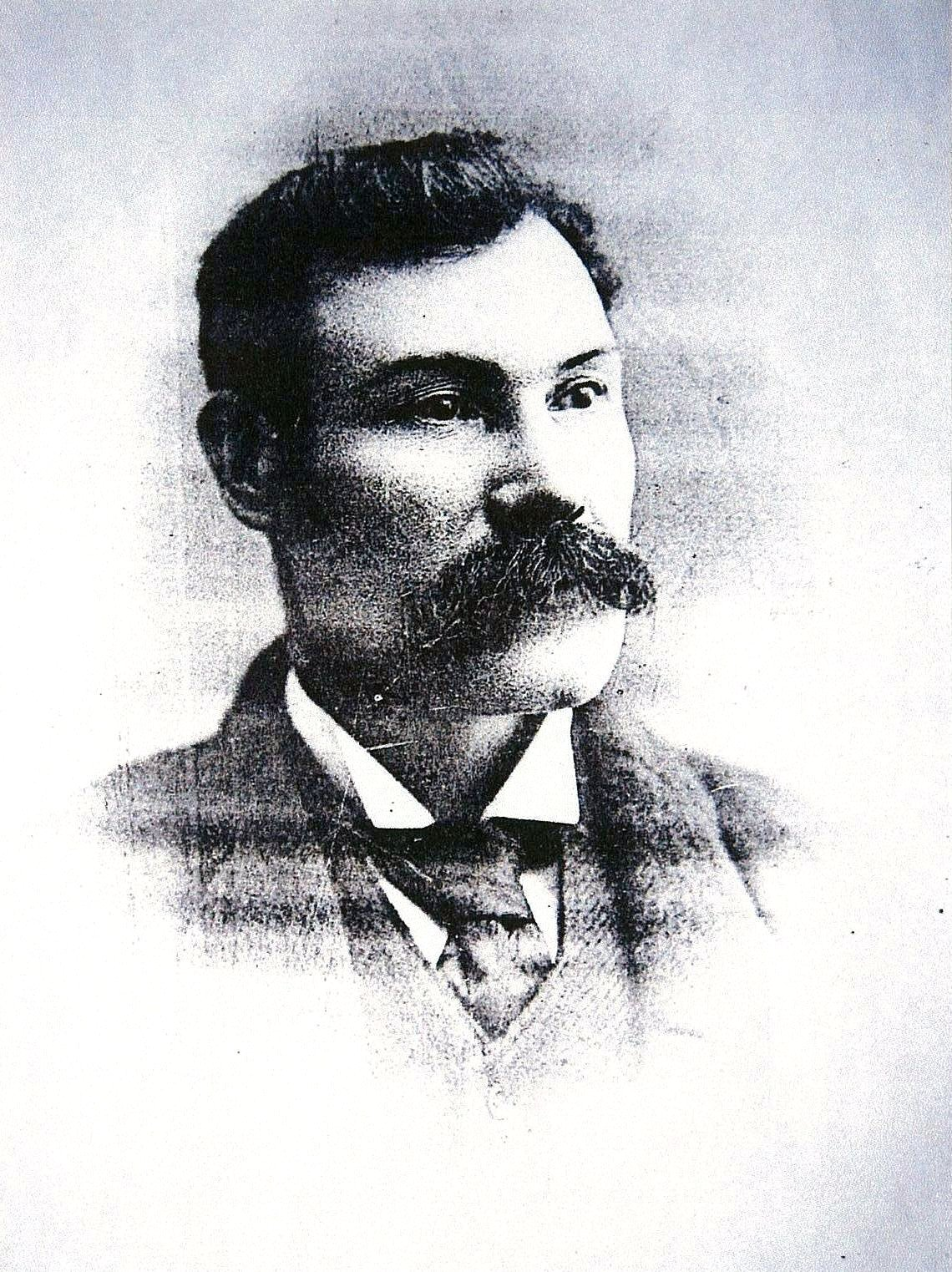
- Andrew Blain Baird Portrait photo
- Born: 1 January 1862; Sandhead, Rhinns of Galloway, Scotland
- Died: 9 September 1951 (aged 89); Rothesay, Isle of Bute, Scotland
- Citizenship: United Kingdom
- Occupations: Aviator, blacksmith, businessman
- Known for: First attempted all-Scottish heavier-than-air powered flight
- Spouse: Euphemia Martin (m. 1892)
- Children: 4

Andrew Blain Baird (1 January 1862 – 9 September 1951) was a Scottish blacksmith and aviation pioneer. He made the first attempted all-Scottish heavier-than-air powered flight in the Baird monoplane on 11 September 1910. Baird was also one of the founding members of the Scottish Aeronautical Society.

== Early life ==
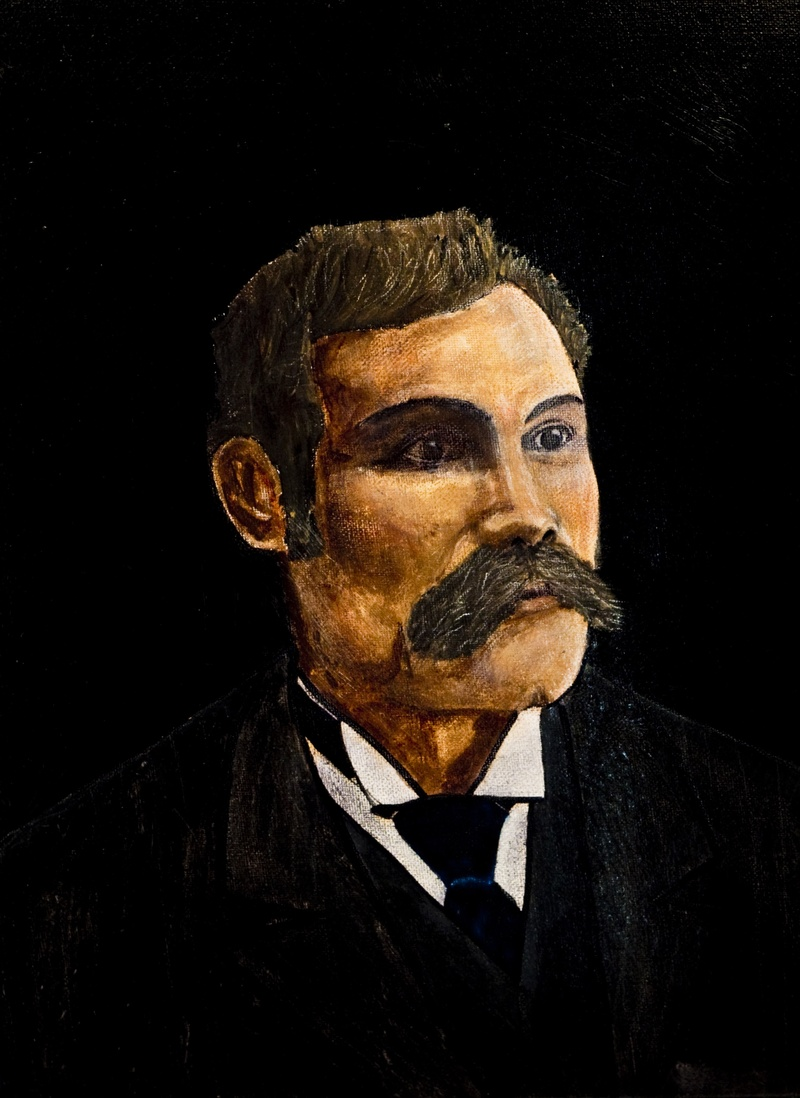
Portrait of Baird

=== Childhood ===
Andrew Blain Baird was born in Sandhead on Luce Bay in the Rhinns of Galloway, Scotland. One of three sons, his father was a fisherman and handloom weaver. He became an apprentice to a blacksmith in Sandhead, worked as a lighthouse keeper on the island of Lismore, and then as an ironworker at Smith and McLean's on the Clyde shipyards. In 1887, when he was 25, he before opened his own smithy at 113 High Street in Rothesay, Isle of Bute.

=== Family ===
In 1892, at the age of 30, Baird married Euphemia Martin (d. 19 January 1938) at Glecknabae Farm on Bute. Baird had four children: Agnes (1904–1909), Susan (1908–1909), John, and Andrew (d. 2011).

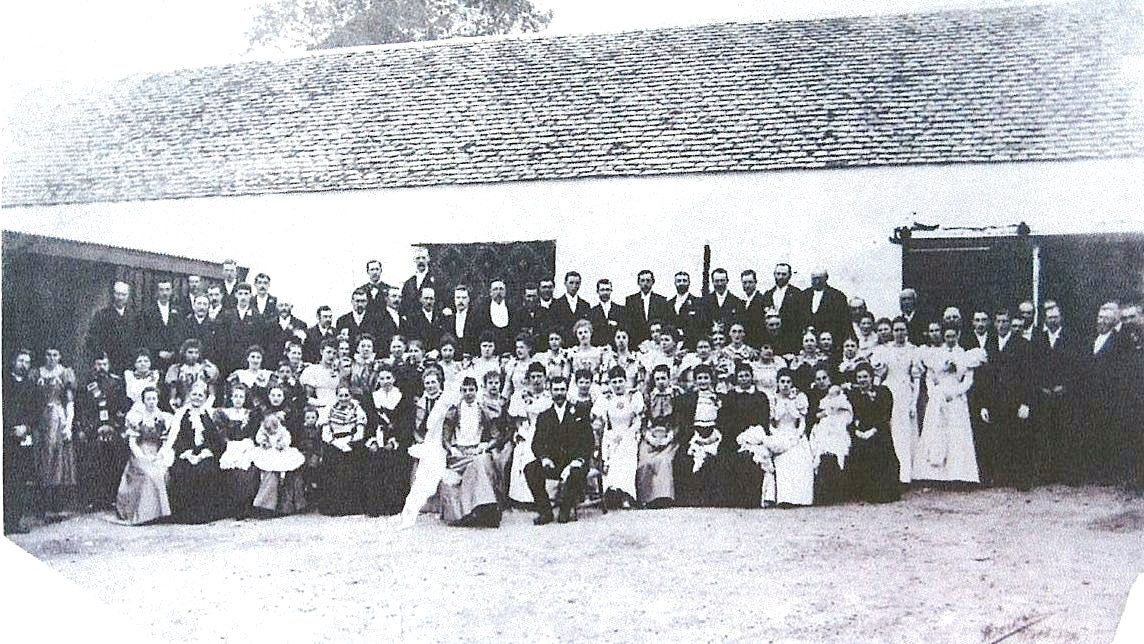
Baird and Martin's wedding

== Development of the Baird monoplane ==
The excitement generated by the Wright Brothers' successful flight in 1903 piqued Baird's interest in aviation. He corresponded with the early aviators Louis Bleriot and S. F. Cody and exchanged information about aircraft design. Inspired by a visit to Blackpool for England's first ever Aviation Week in October 1909, he returned to Rothesay ready to design and build his own sophisticated monoplane similar to Bleriot's, with a four-cylinder, air- and water-cooled engine built by the Alexander brothers in Edinburgh. His wife sewed brown trussore silk for the wings.

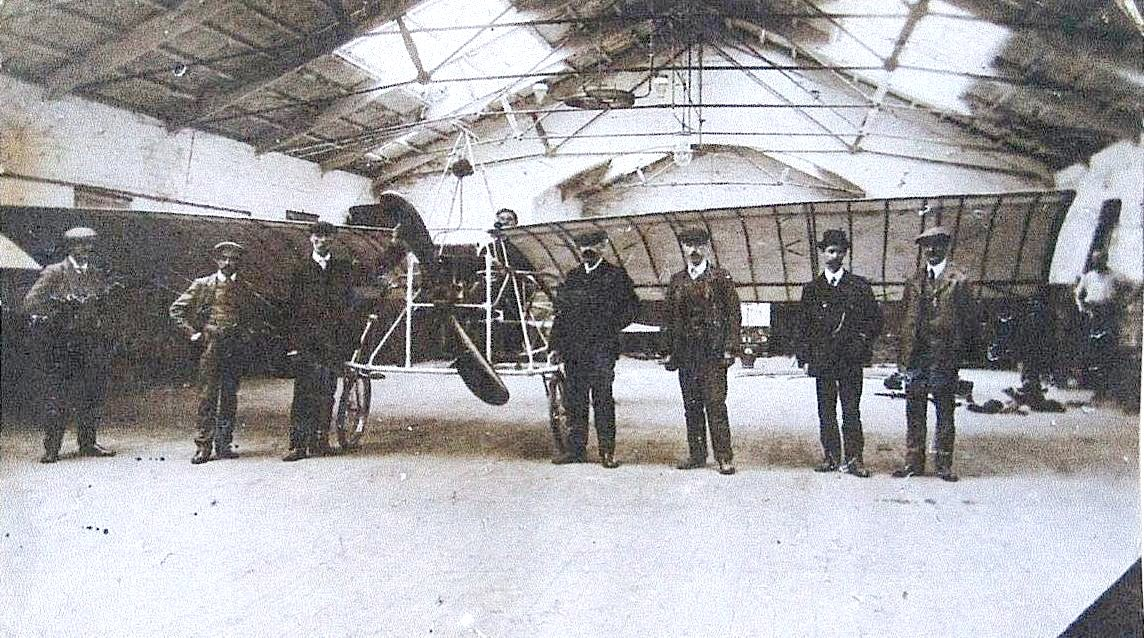
The Baird team

Once completed in the summer of 1910, the Baird monoplane went on show at an exhibition at Rothesay, and on 20 August 1910, it was a featured attraction at the Bute Highland Games. The aircraft manufacturer Thomas Sopwith traveled to Rothesay and examined the Baird monoplane while it was on display at the Highland Games. With Baird's permission, Sopwith drew on some of Baird's innovations when developing his own designs for aircraft that "went on to have a significant impact in World War I".

== Baird's attempted flight ==
Early in the morning on 11 September 1910, the Baird monoplane was loaded onto a horse-drawn wagon and driven to Ettrick Bay, a beach with a wide expanse of sand that was suitable for flight. A small crowd had gathered, including a reporter from the Flight magazine.

In operating the monoplane, Baird was assisted by his friend Ned Striven, an electrical engineer with the Burgh of Rothesay who had contributed to the construction of the engine and design of the aircraft. The monoplane successfully accelerated and cleared the ground, but quickly veered and landed, damaging a main wheel and one of the plane's wings. Baird was uninjured in the flight attempt. The total distance flown by the Baird monoplane is unknown.

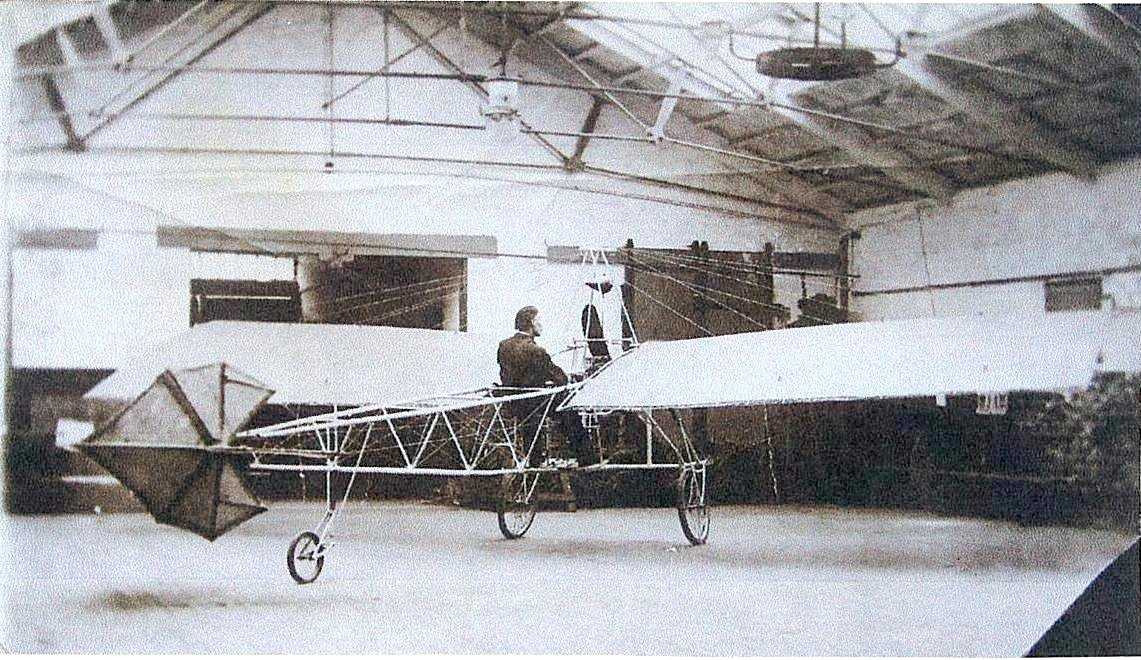
Baird in the monoplane

On 24 September 1910, Flight published the following report of Baird's attempted flight: "Last week the monoplane which has been built by Mr. A. B. Baird... was taken out for trial at Ettrick Bay. With Mr. Baird acting as pilot, the monoplane made a trial, but exhibited a tendency to swerve to the left. On the elevator being operated the machine rose in the air, but made a sudden turn to the right and fell, sustaining some slight damage".

Despite the flight's short duration, Baird is considered the first Scot to achieve heavier-than-air powered flight in a Scottish-built plane. It was not, however, the first flight in Scotland; brothers Frank and Harold Barnwell had successfully flown a powered biplane in Stirling in 1909, but they were not Scottish themselves.

== Aftermath of the flight ==
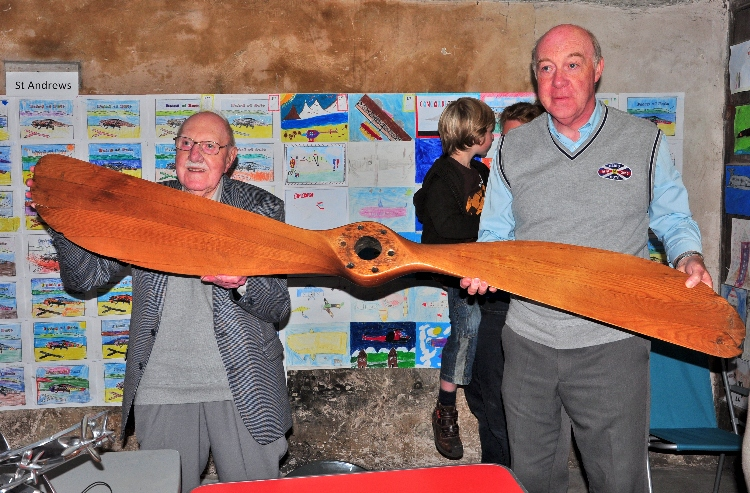
Baird's son Andrew Baird II and grandson Andrew Baird III with the original propeller in Rosenthay in 2010, during the centenary celebrations of the flight.

It is unknown if Baird ever attempted to fly his monoplane again after his initial attempt. The location of the body of the plane is also currently unknown. However, the Edinburgh-made engine remained in Baird's workshop on High Street until its demolition in the early 1950s, after which it was donated to the Museum of Transport in Glasgow, where it remains in their collection. The original 71-inch propeller remained in private ownership until 2010, when it was donated to the National Museum of Flight in East Fortune to mark the centenary anniversary of the original flight.

== Legacy ==
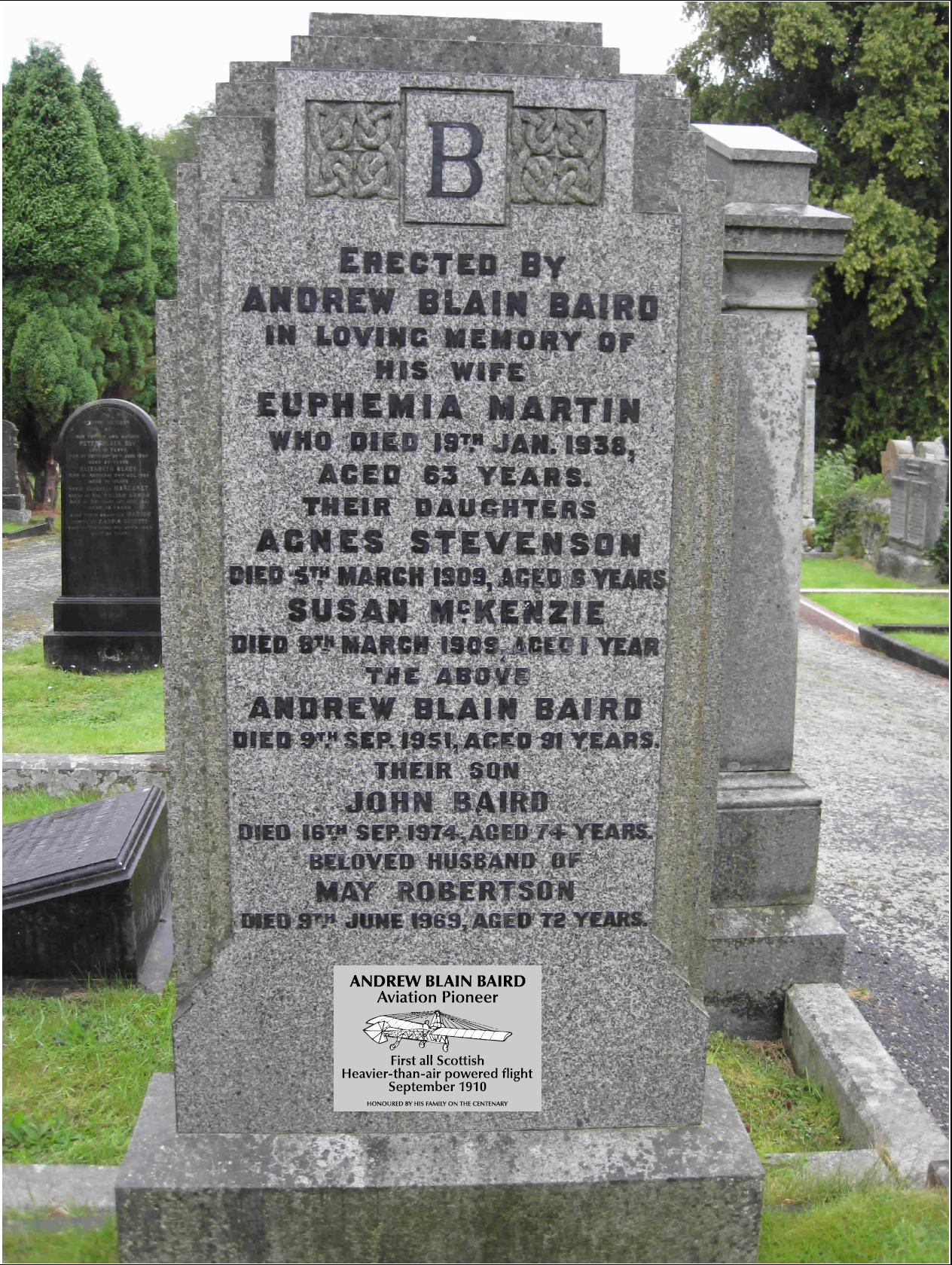
Baird's memorial

Baird died in Rothesay on 9 September 1951 at age 91. On 4 July 1952, the local newspaper, The Buteman, ran an advertisement for his business and a tribute to Baird. The ad read: "A. B. Baird & Son, General Blacksmiths and Horse-shoers, Implement Makers and Mechanical Engineers – and Ornamental Iron Workers", while the tribute read "A valiant Scotsman with a creative mind. His hand was ever open and against no man. A man of mettle".

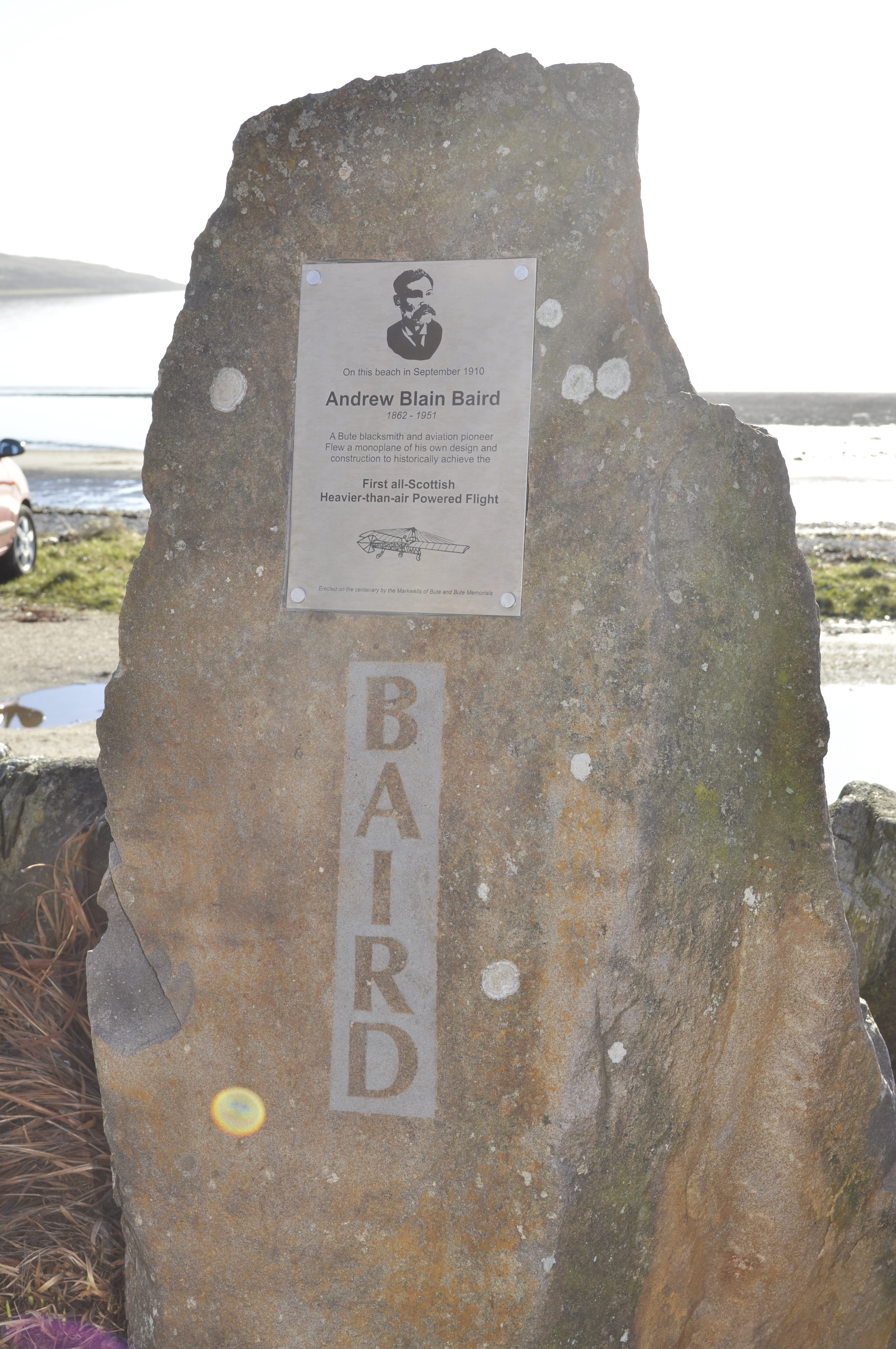
Memorial plaque for Baird's flight at Ettrick Bay

In 2010, one hundred years after the original flight, the airstrip on the southern end of the island was renamed Baird Airstrip to honor Baird's flight. Commencing with the centenary of the flight and annually on the first Saturday in September, a Baird of Bute Festival is held on Bute at both Baird Airstrip and at Ettrick Bay, the site of the attempted flight.

In 2011, Christopher Richard Markwell, the Bute-born former chief executive of the Royal Bank of Canada Insurance Group, founded the Baird of Bute Society, dedicated to honoring Baird's aeronautic and entrepreneurial legacy. The Society seeks to promote Baird's legacy and the history of aerospace endeavor in Scotland by offering scholarships, awards, and school programmes.

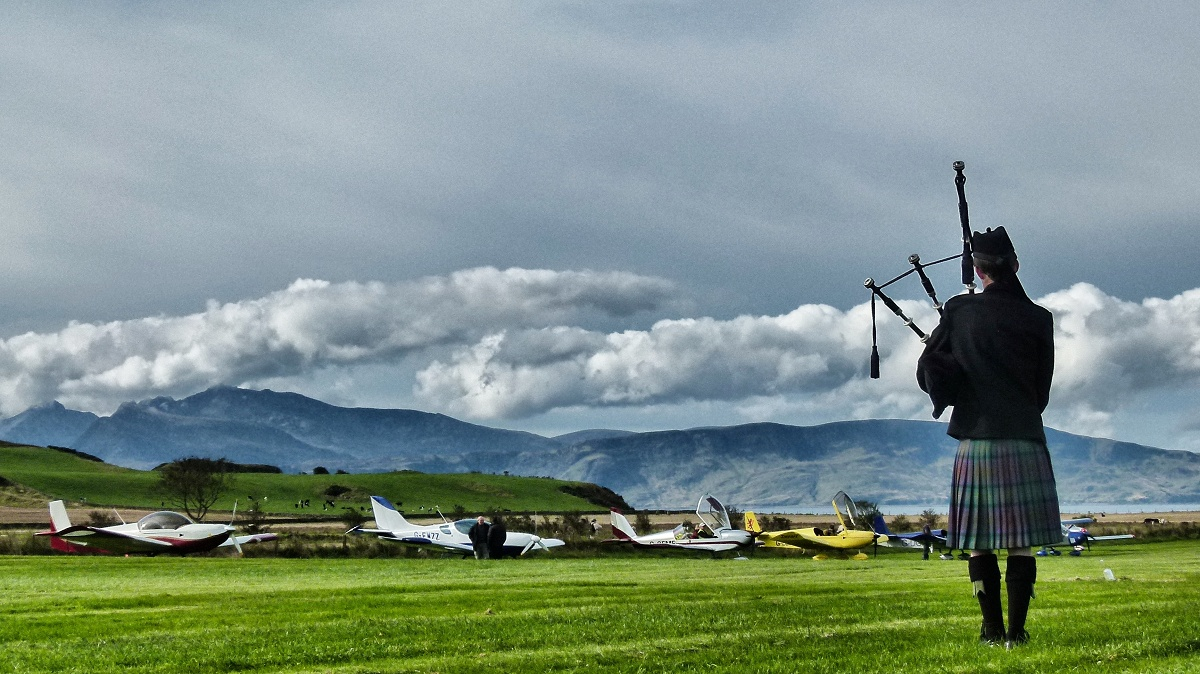
Baird Day at Andrew Baird Airfield, taken by Michael Russell
