= James Gray (sculptor) =

Director of the Glasgow School of Art
- In office 1932 – 1933
- Preceded by: John Daniel Revel
- Succeeded by: William Oliphant Hutchison

Personal details
- Education: Glasgow School of Art
- Occupation: Artist, educationalist

James Gray (9 June 1866 – 9 January 1947) was a sculptor and former Director of the Glasgow School of Art. He took the post of interim Director in 1932.

== Life ==
His father was James Gray (11 May 1834 - 23 July 1916), a farmer from St Quivox. His mother was Margaret Traill (3 June 1835 - 16 November 1891) from Sorn, East Ayrshire. They married on 15 November 1864 in Crossbush, Riccarton in Ayrshire.

James married Janet Spence McIntyre (died 24 March 1947), known as Netta in Bowmore, Islay in 1905. They had a son James Pharuig McIntyre Gray.

== Art ==
Gray had studied at the Glasgow School of Art from 1899 to 1904, when Fra Newbury was Director of the School. He became certified as a teacher under the old South Kensington system.

In 1893 he exhibited at the Royal Glasgow Institute of the Fine Arts his work: Farm Yard.

He exhibited at the Royal Glasgow Institute of the Fine Arts his work: Portaferry, Ireland in 1897.

He exhibited at the RGI in 1903 his work: The Pursuit Of Fame.

In 1914 he exhibited at the RGI his work: Design For Titanic Memorial. He exhibited three Breton inspired works at the RGI in 1915.

In 1916 he exhibited at the Royal Glasgow Institute of the Fine Arts his works: Coloured Relief and Pharuig. In 1918 he exhibited at the Royal Glasgow Institute of the Fine Arts his works: L' Chanson D'Amour and a bust called Time's Passage.

In 1925 he exhibited at the Royal Glasgow Institute of the Fine Arts his work: Felicity.

== Death ==
He died on 9 January 1947.

The Glasgow Herald obituary of 10 January 1947:

Mr. James Gray, Birene, Brookfield, who was for 28 years a member of staff in the modelling section of Glasgow School of Art died yesterday. On two occasions he was interim director of the school and he was also a registrar for a time. Tributes was paid to his services by governors, staff and students in 1934 at a presentation ceremony to mark his retirement. For many years Mr. Gray was a member of Glasgow Art Club.
