= Baird of Bute Society =

Scottish organization

- Baird of Bute Society logo
- Founded: 2011
- Location: Isle of Bute, Scotland
- Website: www.bairdofbute.co.uk/baird-of-bute-society/
- The Baird of Bute Society is registered as a charity (#SC042490) by the Office of the Scottish Charity Regulator (OSCR).

The Baird of Bute Society recognizes and promotes the historical achievements of Andrew Blain Baird, the Bute blacksmith who on 17 September 1910, at Ettrick Bay on Bute, flew a plane of his own design and manufacture to record the First All-Scottish Heavier-than-air Powered Flight.

The Baird of Bute Society is focused on the advancement of education and information related to Andrew Blain Baird and his aviation and entrepreneurial activity. The Society participates in the advancement of the arts, heritage, culture and science on the Isle of Bute and beyond.

== Trustees ==
- Christopher Richard Markwell, Founder & Chair
- Prof. Eleanor Campbell FRS, Trustee & Vice-Chair
- Prof. Michael Russell MSP, Trustee
- Prof. Iain Gray CBE FRSE, Trustee
- Prof. Dugald Cameron OBE, DSc, DA, Trustee
- Craig Clark MBE, Trustee
- Isobel Strong, Trustee
- Joshua McFadden, Trustee
- J. S. Thom CA, Independent Examiner of Accounts

== Patron ==
- Sir Stephen John Hillier KCB, CBE, DFC, ADC, MA

== Awards ==
=== Baird of Bute Scottish Aviation Award ===
Year	Recipient
2012	Scott Grier OBE
2013	Professor Dugald Cameron OBE
2014	Amanda McMillan OBE
2015	Gordon McConnel OBE
2016	Iain Gray CBE FRSE
2017	Sir Stephen Hillier KCB, CBE, DFC, ADC, MA
2018	Gordon Watson
2019	Sir Stuart Atha KBE CB DSO

=== Baird of Bute Scottish Innovation Award ===
Year	Recipient
2013	Dr Patrick Gunning
2014	Craig Clark MBE
2015	Eleanor Campbell FRS FRSE
2016	William Leitch
2017	Sir Fraser Stoddart FRS FRSE
2018	Sheila Rowan (physicist) MBE FRS FRSE
2019	Richard Henderson (biologist) CH FRS

== Scholarships ==
=== Baird of Bute Canadian Science Scholarship ===
This two week Canadian Science Scholarship provides for up to three young people from across Scotland, the opportunity to acquire experiences and skills to allow each to better succeed in their upcoming university studies. Centred in Toronto, the hands on "Bench to Bedside" programme is supported by University of Toronto, Ontario Science Centre, University Health Network, the Scottish Government and mentored by Cancer researcher Professor Patrick Gunning and bio-ethicist Professor Hazel Markwell.

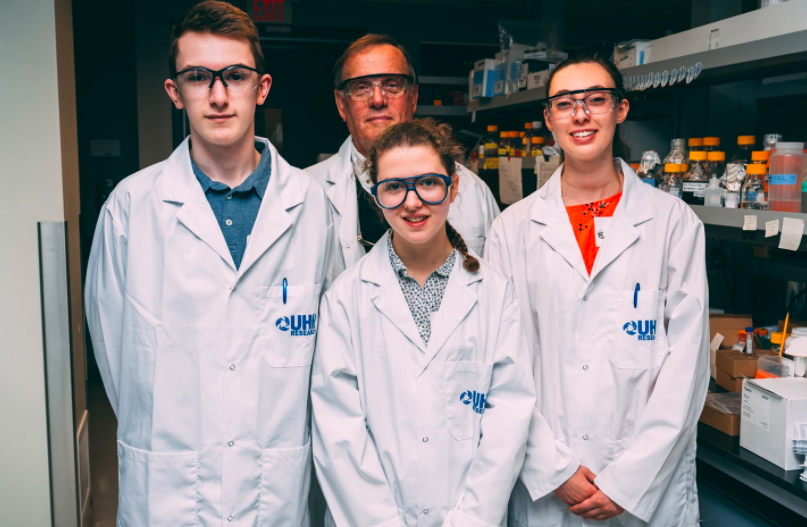

Year	Recipient(s)
2014	Bonnie Caldwell (Rothesay Academy, Isle of Bute), Joshua McFadden (Rothesay Academy, Isle of Bute)
2015	Nisha Middleton (Rothesay Academy, Isle of Bute), Euan McGregor (Rothesay Academy, Isle of Bute)
2016	Eilidh Summers (Ullapool High School), Keir Carmichael (Gryffe High School, Houston)
2018	Cara Corman (Tarbert Academy, Isle of Gigha), Lewis Strachan (Cardinal Newman High School, Bellshill) & Zara Henry (Rothesay Academy, Isle of Bute)
2019	Lauren Santandreu (St Thomas of Aquin's High School, Edinburgh), Rebecca Bean (Forrester High School, Edinburgh) & Andrew Middleton (Rothesay Academy, Isle of Bute)

=== Scottish Young Achiever Award ===
Awarded on occasion to recognise a young Scot.

Year	Recipient
2017	Jane Ross Scottish International football player

=== William Leitch Space Scholarship ===
Named in honour of the 19th century Bute born scientist and clergyman, Dr. William Leitch, now credited as first to publish the theory that travel in space was best undertaken with jet propulsion - decades before those earlier credited. Each year one graduate of the Strathclyde University Scottish Space School is selected to spend an internship at Scotland's Clyde Space, one of the world's foremost manufacturers of cube satellites.

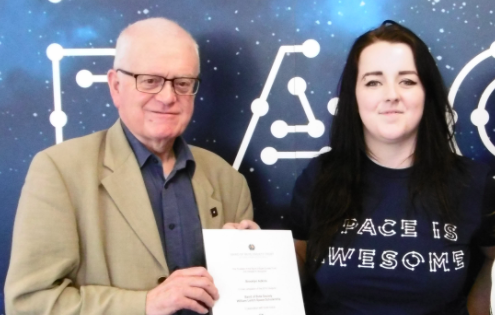

Year	Recipient
2016	Brooklyn Adkins (St Paul's Secondary, Glasgow)
2018	Ms. Casey (Conn Renfrew High School)
2019	Michael Miller (Graeme High School, Falkirk)

== Lectures & Programmes ==
=== Lord Smith of Kelvin Lecture ===
This lecture is an annual open event with a Scottish perspective of interest on aviation and innovation topics delivered at University of Strathclyde in Glasgow by noted Scots who have previously been recipients of a Baird of Bute Society Scottish Award. It was established by the Society and the University to honour Lord Smith of Kelvin who was inaugural Patron of the Society and is Chancellor of the University.

=== Inspiring Science Programme ===
A visiting school programme presented in cooperation with Edinburgh University and led by Baird Society Vice Chair Professor Eleanor Campbell who is Chair of Chemistry at the university. She and a team of staff and graduate students visit secondary schools, in exurban communities, to discuss new scientific research, demonstrates chemistry in action and give students hands-on experience and an opportunity to interact with the team. Its STEM based outreach often extends into the participating local community with mini science fairs and parent involvement.

== Events ==
=== Annual Baird of Bute Festival of Flight ===
The annual "Baird of Bute Festival of Flight" takes place during the third weekend of September.

Date	Notes	Links
09/2014		Baird Festival 2014
09/2013		Baird Festival 2013
09/2012	150th anniversary of the birth of Andrew Blain Baird	Baird Festival 2012
09/2011	Glorious sunshine, at Baird Airstrip, Ettrick Bay and Mount Stuart	Baird Festival 2011
09/2010	Centenary (17 September 1910)	Baird Festival 2010

=== Baird Society's Tenth Anniversary Celebrations ===
As part of the 2019 Baird Awards and Celebration weekend, the Society was joined by Scotland's First Minister Rt. Honourable Nicola Sturgeon at a Civic Reception in the Ilse of Bute Discovery Centre, honouring the tenth anniversary of Baird of Bute, where she said

“I am delighted to be able to join all of you for this anniversary event…. As you look back on the decade, I hope you can see what a big difference you are making to this island and indeed to Scotland."

== Publications ==
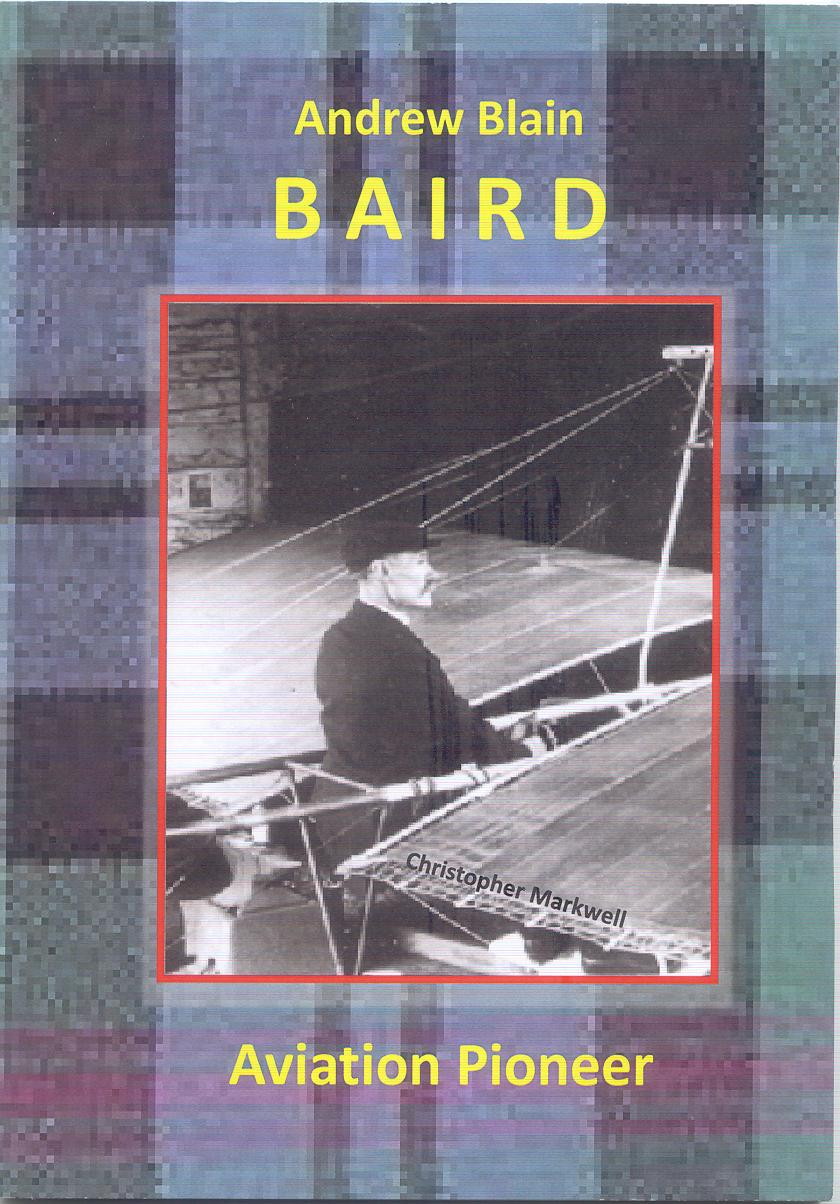

- Markwell, Christopher Richard (2012). Andrew Blain Baird – Aviation Pioneer.
