= Wellington Reiter =

American architect, academic administrator

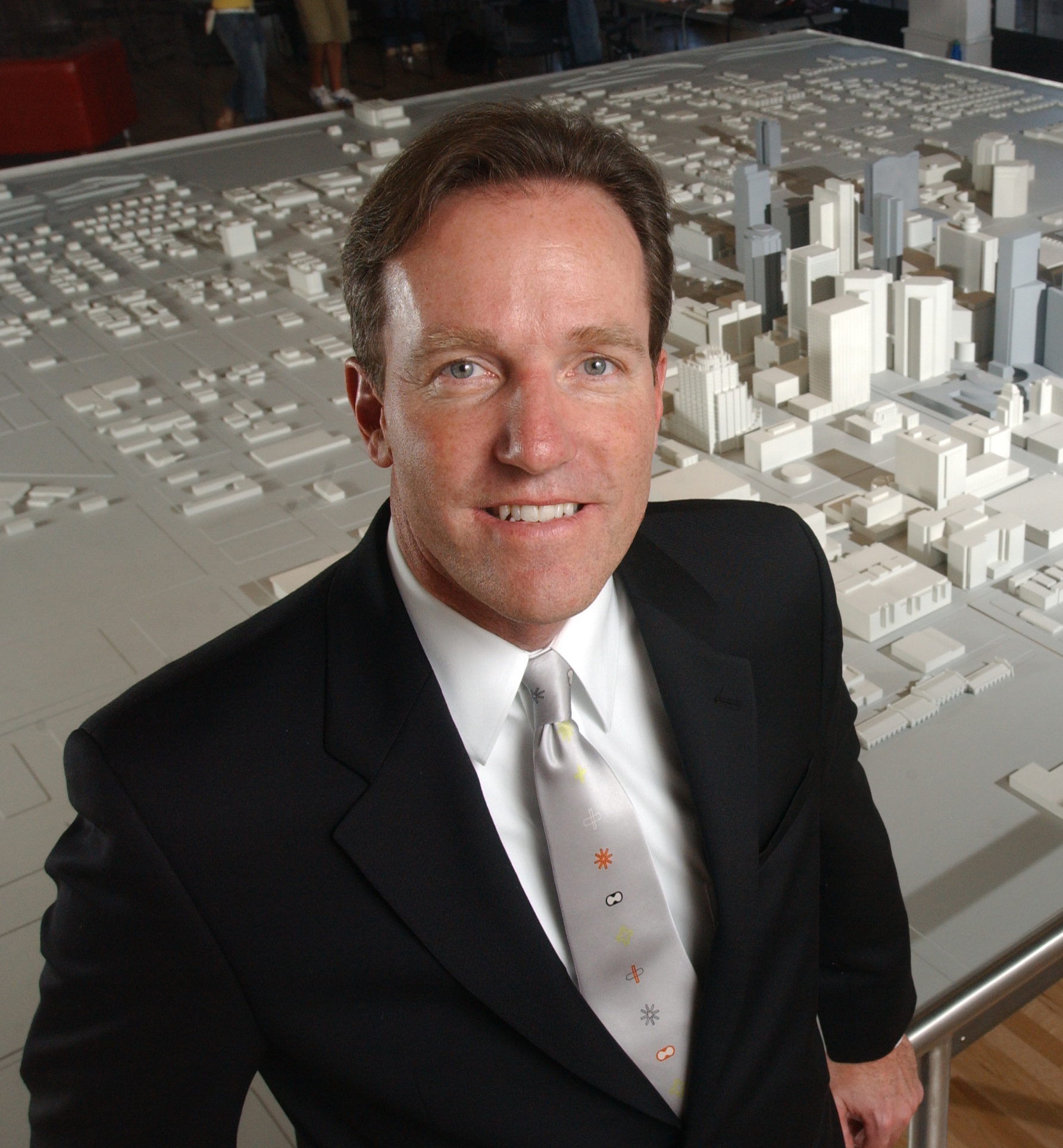

President of the School of the Art Institute of Chicago
- In office 2008–2010
- Preceded by: Tony Jones
- Succeeded by: Walter E. Massey

Personal details
- Born: 1957 (age 68–69) Akron, Ohio, United States
- Children: 2
- Education: Tulane University, Harvard School of Design
- Occupation: Architect, designer, academic administrator

Wellington "Duke" Reiter, FAIA, (born 1957), is an American architect and urban designer, and a Senior Adviser at Arizona State University. From 2008 to 2010 he was president of the School of the Art Institute of Chicago (SAIC).

== Biography ==
Reiter graduated with a B. Arch. from Tulane University in 1981, and an M. Arch. from the Harvard School of Design (now Harvard Graduate School of Design) in 1986.

He founded a consultancy, Urban Instruments (1994–2003), and was professor of practice at Massachusetts Institute of Technology (1990–2003). He was dean of the school of design at Arizona State University (2003–2008).

From 2008 to 2010 he was president of the School of the Art Institute of Chicago (SAIC), before returning to ASU in 2011, serving in a variety of roles, including as 'senior adviser to the president'.

Reiter is particularly interested in the economic, cultural, and sustainability of major US metro areas and the engagement of the colleges and universities that are embedded within them. He was involved in the conceptualization and creation of the award-winning Downtown Phoenix Campus for Arizona State University (ASU). He works to grow the University City Exchange (UCX) and advance integrative project frameworks that fuse university resources with urban development projects to address crucial issues.

He is a national trustee and chair of the University Development and Innovation Council for the Urban Land Institute.

== Awards ==
- Arizona Architect's medal
- Fellow of the American Institute of Architects.
- Wheelwright Prize

== Books ==
- Vessels and Fields (monograph). Princeton Architectural Press, 1996
