= Seona Reid =

Scottish arts administrator (born 1950)

Director of the Glasgow School of Art
- In office 1999 – 2013
- Preceded by: Dugald Cameron
- Succeeded by: Tom Inns

Personal details
- Born: 1950
- Occupation: Educationalist

Dame Seona Elizabeth Reid DBE FRSE FRSA (born 21 January 1950) is a Scottish arts administrator who was director of the Glasgow School of Art from 1999 to 2013, and former director of the Scottish Arts Council from 1990 to 1999.

== Early life ==
Reid was born on 21 January 1950 to Isobel Margaret Reid and George Robert Hall.

== Career ==
Reid was appointed Director of the Glasgow School of Art in September 1999 and retired in September 2013. Previously she served as director of the Scottish Arts Council for nine years, and before that Assistant Director (Strategy and Regional Development) of Greater London Arts; Director of Shape; Head of Public Relations Ballet Rambert; Press and Publicity Officer at Northern Dance Theatre; Business Manager, Lincoln Theatre Royal and a freelance arts Consultant working with the Arts Council of Great Britain and the London Contemporary Dance Trust.

She is Chair of the British Council Scottish Advisory Committee, British Council Trustee, Vice Chair of Wasps Artists Studio and on the Board of the Edinburgh International Cultural Summit Foundation. Previously she has been Trustee of Tate, Chair of the National Theatre of Scotland, and Deputy Chair and Scottish Chair of the Heritage Lottery Fund, Scotland’s Fulbright Commissioner, Chair of Cove Park, Guest Chair of the Saltire Society Scotland Housing Design Awards; a member of the DCMS Advisory Panel for the Selection of UK City of Culture 2017; a Commissioner on the Scottish Broadcasting Commission; a member of the Knowledge and Evaluation Committee of the Arts and Humanities Research Council, Vice Chair of the Lighthouse Centre for Architecture, Design and the City in Glasgow, and on the boards of The Arches and of Suspect Culture Theatre.

== The Glasgow School of Art ==
Reid's directorship at the Glasgow School of Art was marked by a notable enhancement of the School's Research Profile, a focus on Internationalisation, major Postgraduate growth and the significant redevelopment of the School's estate. This included an £8.7m Conservation and Access project in the famous A listed Mackintosh Building and a new £50m building opposite, the Reid Building, designed by award winning US Architect Steven Holl . As well as securing funds from public and private sources for these initiatives, secured increased core funding from Scottish Funding Council recognising the diseconomies of scale for small, specialist institutions, the GSA's distinctive studio-based educational model and the GSA's research standing as recognised in the UK-wide Research Assessment Exercise.

== Honours ==
She is a Fellow of the Royal Society of Arts, a fellow of the Royal Society of Edinburgh (2015), was awarded the honorary degree of Doctor of Arts from Robert Gordon University, Aberdeen in 1995, became an honorary professor of the University of Glasgow in 1999, received an honorary degree of Doctor of Letters from the university in 2001, received an honorary Doctor of Letters from Glasgow Caledonian University in 2005 and from University of Strathclyde in 2009, all for services to the arts in Scotland.

She was appointed Commander of the Order of the British Empire (CBE) in the 2008 New Year Honours and Dame Commander of the Order of the British Empire (DBE) in the 2014 New Year Honours, both for services to the creative industries. Other awards include Institute of Directors, Scottish Public Sector Director of the Year 2013, People Make Glasgow Inspiring City Awards 2013 for Education, Arts and Business Leadership Award 2013 and Institute of Directors Chairman's Award 2015.
