= Moses Stevens of Bellahouston =

Scottish advocate and philanthropist (1806–1871)

Moses Steven of Bellahouston FRSE (1806–1871) was a 19th Scottish advocate and philanthropist.

== Life ==
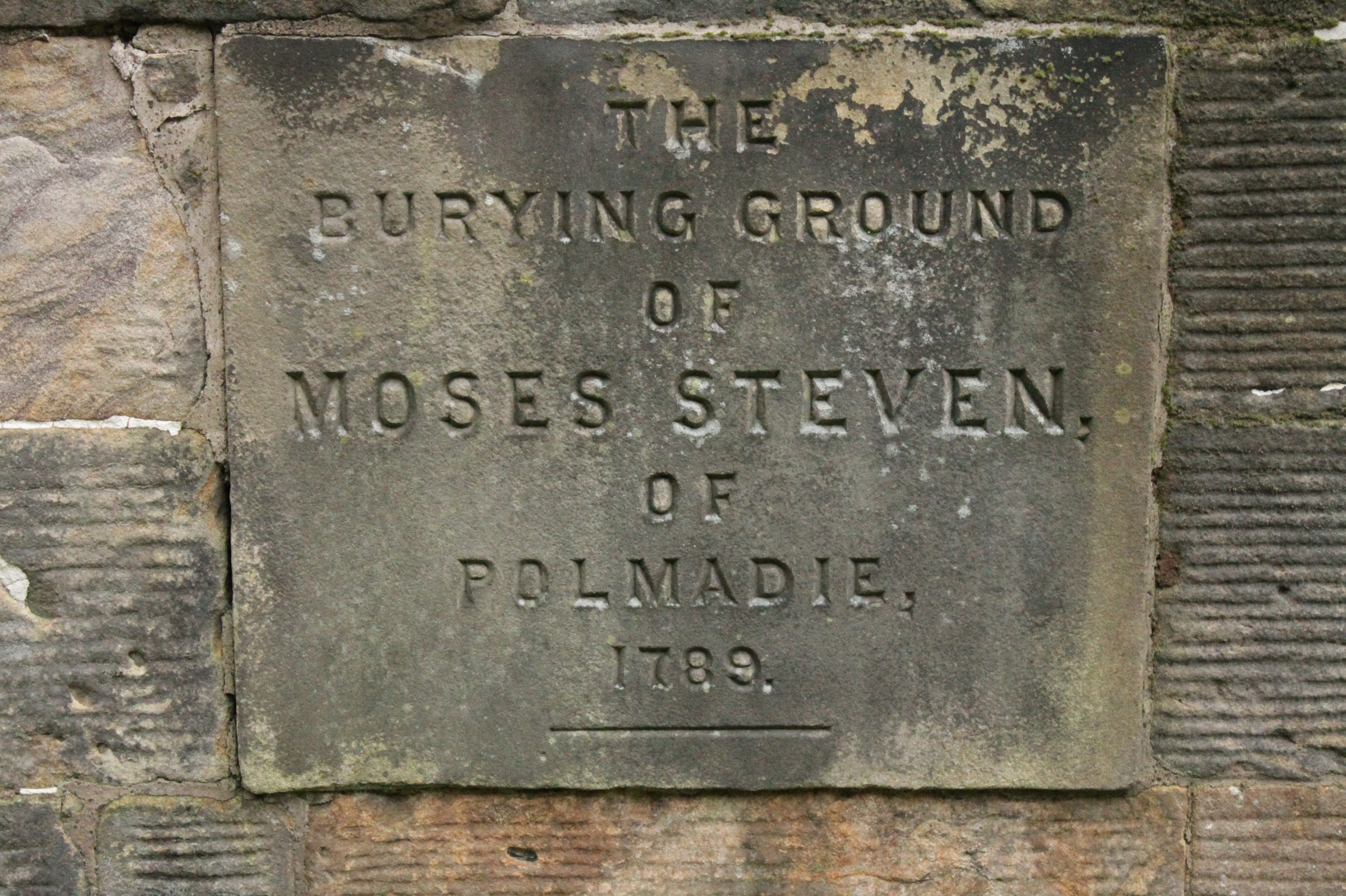
The grave of Moses Steven, Ramshorn Cemetery

He was born in Polmadie House in Govan on 21 December 1806 the son of Moses Steven (sic) of Polmadie (1748-1831). His father was originally a farmer in Drymen but had become a very successful linen merchant in Glasgow under the name of Buchanan, Stevens & Co.

In 1824 his father bought the Bellahouston estate from the heirs of Thomas Rowan. The ancient house of Dumbreck House on the site was replaced by a new villa known as Bellahouston House.

He studied law at Glasgow University and qualified as an advocate in 1828. In 1847 he was elected a Fellow of the Royal Society of Edinburgh. His proposer was John Shank More.

During his life he funded Bellahouston Church and created a new parish there.

He died at 12 Manor Place, Edinburgh on 27 July 1871. He is buried with his sister in New Calton Burial Ground, Edinburgh. He never married and lived with his sisters, Grizel (d.1888) and Elizabeth (d.1892). On the death of Elizabeth, Moses wishes came in to force. Neither sister had married but he wished them to remain at Bellahouston for the remainder of their lives. His will then gave the Bellahouston estate to the city of Glasgow, creating Bellahouston Park, Glasgow's largest public park (176 acres). In 1899 18 acres were split off to create Bellahouston Golf Course.

The monies also allowed the formation of the Bellahouston Trust whose numerous philanthropic donations included £10,000 towards the initial cost of the famous Glasgow School of Art.
