= John Daniel Revel =

Director of the Glasgow School of Art
- In office 1925 – 1932
- Preceded by: John Henderson
- Succeeded by: James Gray

Personal details
- Born: 2 February 1884
- Died: 25 November 1967 (aged 83)
- Education: Royal College of Art
- Occupation: Artist, educationalist

John Daniel Revel (2 February 1884 - 25 November 1967) was an artist; and former Director of the Glasgow School of Art. He took the post of Director in 1925.

== Life ==
His father was John Daniel Revel [Snr] (10 February 1852 - 1924); and his mother Barbara Scott (21 July 1851 - 5 February 1929). Both were from Dundee. They married on 28 June 1875 in the city.

John Daniel Revel was born on 2 February 1884 in Dundee, one of their six children.

In 1901 he was a student teacher training to be an art teacher at Dundee Art School. He studied under Thomas Dunn. From 1906 he went to the Royal College of Art in London, and studied there to 1911.

He took up the post of the headmaster of the Chelsea School of Art, Mannersie Road, in 1912.

He married another Scottish painter, Lucy Mackenzie (c.1888 - 10 November 1961) from Moray, in January 1913 in Chelsea, London. In the First World War, she assumed her husband's place as Art Master of the Chelsea art school.

During the First World War he became an official artist of the Expeditionary Force in Mesopotamia and India. He served as a sergeant in the 14th Mountain Battery.

He took up the post of Director of the Glasgow School of Art on 2 March 1925. A month in the role he gave this commendation of the school:

There was no finer portrait painting being done in Britain, in any school of the country, than was being done in the Glasgow School of Art. The portrait painting was remarkable on the top standard, and could not be equalled today. It was a great school, full of very brilliant students and there was surely a future for the young men and women who were leaving it. It seemed to him that those students who had taken their diplomas should make some return to their teachers, and let them see their work on the walls of exhibitions. They would do a great service to Glasgow by insisting upon producing work wherever thev went.

In 1928, he gave an assessment of Fra Newbury's term of office as Director of the Art School, and his linking the school into European and American movements to make it internationally successful, still with a Scottish character.

Mr. Newbery realised that though art may be national in character; it was in language international, and by the introduction of foreign professors and interchange of work with continental cities, the school was in touch with all movements of importance in Europe and America. Under Mr. Newbery's direction the School attained a worldwide reputation.

Revel also thanked the Board of Governors. Whether his views later changed on the Board is not known:

Revel goes on to commend the Governors for their wise counsel in the difficult business of adjusting the balance between the aesthetic and the utilitarian sides of the curriculum.

He was on leave in 1932 due to 'indifferent health' for some time. At the end of the summer term he retired. This may have been due to war-time trauma or the fact that he made enemies on the board of governors of the school.

He retired to Didcot, formally in Berkshire, where he continued to paint and exhibit work.

== Art ==
He exhibited in the Royal Academy of Arts in 1910 with his work: Old Steeple, Dundee.

He exhibited in the Royal Scottish Academy in 1925 with his works: Edwin Scrymgeour Esq. M.P., E.F. McElwee and Kurds On The Tigris.

He exhibited in the RSA in 1927 with his works: Oxford Road, Blewbury, St. Valery en Caux and The City Of Hit, Mesopotamia.

In 1928 he exhibited in the RSA in 1928 with his works: Little Miss Brown, Romance and Segovia.

He exhibited in the RSA in 1931 with his work: Joseph and Josephine.

In 1932 he exhibited in the RSA with his works: Happy Days!.

He exhibited in the Royal Academy of Arts in 1958 with his work: The Warren, Blewbury.

He exhibited in the RSA in 1959 with his works: Sand And Foam, Isle Of Tiree.

From Reading Evening Post - Tuesday 28 November 1967:

Mr. Revel was a member of the International Society of Painters, the Royal Institute of Oil Painters, the Society of Portrait Painters, and was an associate of the Royal College of Art in painting and architecture.

== Death ==
He died in Battle Hospital, Reading on 25 November 1967. He normally stayed at Lydds, White Shute, Blewbury, near Didcot. Blewbury now resides in Oxfordshire after boundary changes with Berkshire.
