= Penny Macbeth =

English designer and educator

Director of the Glasgow School of Art
- Incumbent
- Assumed office May 2020
- Preceded by: Irene McAra-McWilliam

Personal details
- Born: 1968 (age 57–58)
- Education: Birmingham City University
- Occupation: Educationalist & Researcher
- Profession: Textile Designer

Professor Penny Macbeth is a designer and educator; and current Director of The Glasgow School of Art. She took the post of Director in May 2020 following an international search to replace the then Interim Director Irene McAra-McWilliam.

She is a board trustee of Universities Scotland and Castlefield Gallery Manchester. She was previously a board trustee of CHEAD and represented the sector on the Westminster Parliament All-Party Parliamentary Group for Crafts.

== Life ==
Penny Macbeth trained at Birmingham City University graduating with an MA in Textiles. Following a career in the design sector she joined Huddersfield University becoming Head of the Department of Art and Design, subsequently moving to Manchester Metropolitan University where she became Dean of Manchester School of Art and Deputy Faculty Pro-Vice-Chancellor for Arts and Humanities focusing on external engagement and partnerships.

At Manchester Metropolitan University she was academic lead for the University’s ground breaking School of Digital Arts: SODA, which opened 2021, sat on two citywide bodies: Culture Corridor Group and the St Johns network and was academic board nominee on Manchester Metropolitan’s Board of Governors.

Since joining The Glasgow School of Art Macbeth has overseen the development of a new Strategic Plan, established a new academic School of Innovation and Technologyand published a Strategic Outline Business Case for the rebuilding of the GSA’s Mackintosh Building.

== Works ==
Macbeth is an active researcher. She describes her work as "[exploring] cloth’s potential as a carrier of narrative and catalyst for community empathy and cohesion".
