= Christopher Richard Markwell =

Scottish–Canadian businessman and artist

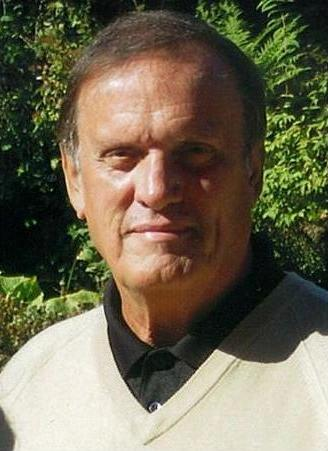
- Born: 22 November 1944; Rothesay, Isle of Bute, Scotland
- Citizenship: United Kingdom/Canada
- Occupations: Chairman and trustee
- Organization: Baird of Bute Society Trust

Christopher Richard Markwell (born 22 November 1944) is a Scottish–Canadian businessman and artist. He is the chairman and trustee of the Baird of Bute Society Trust.

== Early life ==
Christopher Richard Markwell was born in 1944 in Rothesay, Isle of Bute, Scotland. One of two sons, his father was an electrical engineer and a celebrated artist, and his mother the former Margaret Irving. With his family he emigrated to Canada in 1951. Markwell received a Bachelor of Arts in Economics and Political Science at York University in Toronto and Post Graduate Studies in Business Administration at University of Toronto.

== Career ==
After management training at Imperial Oil and at the headquarters of Bata International in Toronto, Markwell began his career in insurance with the Phoenix Assurance Company of Canada (later Phoenix Continental) in 1968, where he rose through various positions to become vice-president of Marketing. Markwell left the Phoenix briefly in 1973 to assume the position of Executive Assistant to the Deputy Minister of Consumer and Commercial Relations. In 1985 he moved to Xerox Financial Crum & Forster, to become its president and chief operating officer. In 1989 Markwell joined Royal Bank of Canada, as Senior Vice President Insurance, later also becoming chairman of a number of Royal Bank companies in Canada and the Caribbean. He left the bank in 1994 as president and CEO of the newly constructed RBC Insurance. and in 1995 he formed Markwell & Associates a family-owned consultancy serving financial services companies in Canada and around the world. He is currently chairman of the Baird of Bute Society Trust.

== Artist ==
Mr Markwell is an accomplished portrait and landscape artist. He has for a number of years built a collection of paintings of the Isle of Bute Scotland (www.buteart.com) His work is often shown and held in a number of private collections including that of the Marquess of Bute. He is a member of the Society of Scottish Artists.

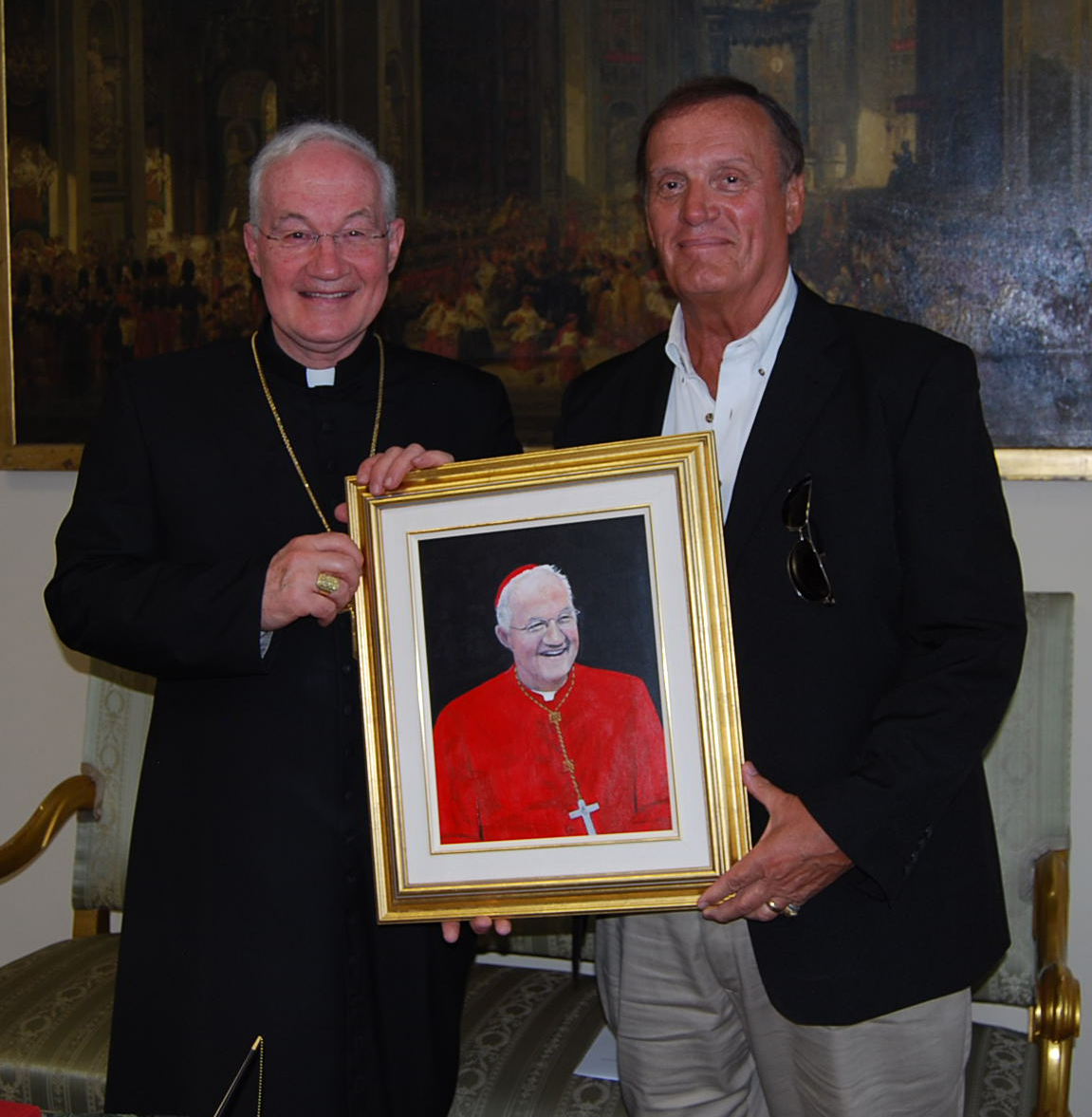
Marc Cardinal Ouellet – Portrait & Presentation by the Artist in the Vatican 2013

== Baird of Bute Society ==

The Baird of Bute Society was established in 2011 by Christopher Markwell, who now in retirement, lives part of the year in Bute. Markwell was instrumental in bringing Andrew Blain Baird to the fore for the centenary of his historic flight and arranged all of the events of the centenary and most since.
