= The Buteman =

- Type: Weekly newspaper
- Format: Tabloid
- Owner: JPIMedia
- Editor: Craig Borland
- Founded: 13 December 1854; 171 years ago
- Ceased publication: 21 June 2019
- Headquarters: 5 Victoria Street; ROTHESAY; PA20 0AJ
- Website: www.buteman.co.uk

The Buteman was a weekly tabloid newspaper serving the Isle of Bute in the Firth of Clyde, Scotland. It first published in 1854 and ceased in 2019. The final publisher was Angus County Press Ltd, a company within the Scotland and North East England division of JPIMedia.

== History ==
The first issue of The Buteman, A General Advertiser for the Western Isles was published on 13 December 1854 from premises in 23 High Street in Rothesay, the only town on the island. In the 20th century the paper's offices had several moves: to Moodie's Court, then to Montague Street, and then Castle Street where staff were located until 2002. The paper was printed on the island until 1980.

In 1981 the paper was taken into ownership by Goldenbolt International. In November 1997 Score Press, the newspaper division of Scottish Radio Holdings, acquired the title for £300,000. In 2006 it was sold to Johnston Press.

In 2015 the paper was selling 1800 to 2000 copies each week. Following the announcement by the local authority that Rothesay would be taking Syrian refugees, there were comments left on the paper's website. The editor Craig Borland responded by writing an editorial in defence of welcoming the refugees and won praise for this community leadership.

In 2018 the owners Johnston Press went into administration and JPI media took the title over. The two remaining staff for the paper were based in Edinburgh.

The last audited circulation figures of 730 were in 2018 and the population of Bute the previous year was 6,144. Circulation dropped further to 500 and JPI Media announced closure of the paper. The final edition of the paper was published on 21 June 2019.
