= Glasgow School of Art =

Fine arts school in Glasgow, Scotland

Coordinates: 55°51′58.04″N 4°15′49.44″W

- Sgoil-ealain Ghlaschu
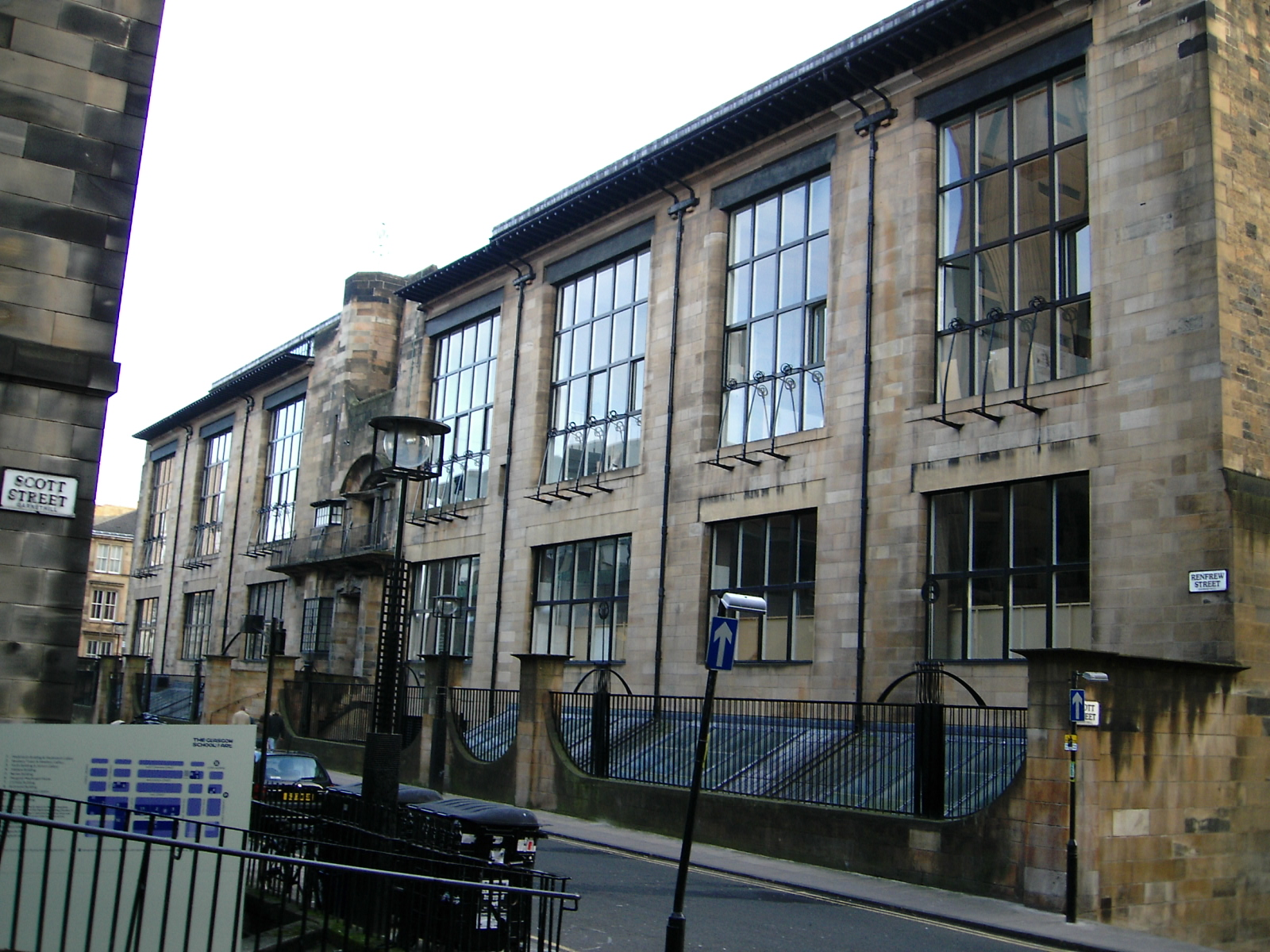
- The Mackintosh building in 2005
- Type: Public university-level art school
- Established: 1845; 181 years ago
- Affiliations: University of Glasgow; Universities UK
- Principal: Professor Penny Macbeth
- Faculty: 160
- Administrative staff: 138
- Students: 2,845 (2024/25)
- Undergraduates: 1,970 (2024/25)
- Postgraduates: 870 (2024/25)
- Doctoral students: 32
- Location: Glasgow, Scotland, UK
- QS Ranking 2026 : Art and Design: 8th
- Website: www.gsa.ac.uk

The Glasgow School of Art (GSA; Scottish Gaelic: Sgoil-ealain Ghlaschu) is a higher education art school based in Glasgow, Scotland, offering undergraduate degrees, post-graduate awards (both taught and research-led), and PhDs in architecture, fine art, and design. These are all awarded by the University of Glasgow.

The school is housed in several buildings around Renfrew Street in the centre of Glasgow, upon Garnethill, an area first developed by William Harley of Blythswood Hill in the early 1800s. The most famous of its buildings was designed by Charles Rennie Mackintosh and Margaret Macdonald Mackintosh in phases between 1896 and 1909. The eponymous Mackintosh Building soon became one of the city's iconic landmarks, of international fame. It is a pioneer of the Modern Style (British Art Nouveau style). The building was severely damaged by fire in May 2014 and destroyed by a second fire in June 2018, with only the burnt-out shell remaining. Plans are in place for its rebuilding in accordance with Charles Rennie Mackintosh's style and content.

== History ==
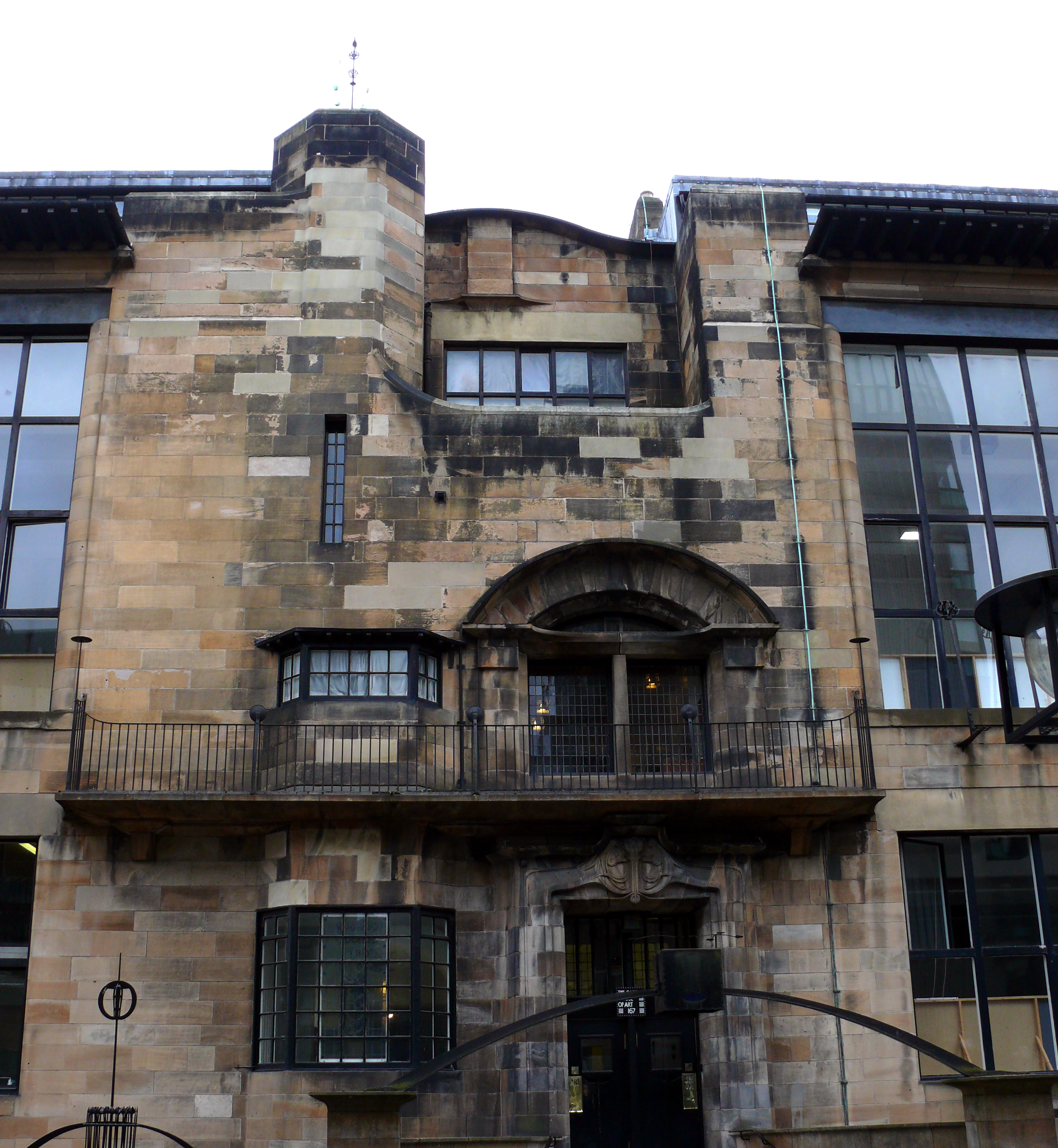
The north façade and main entrance of the Mackintosh building in 2011

Founded in 1845 as the Glasgow Government School of Design, the school changed its name to the Glasgow School of Art in 1853. Originally located at 12 Ingram Street the school moved to the McLellan Galleries in Sauchiehall Street in 1869.

In 1897, work began on a new building nearby to house the school on Renfrew Street, funded by a donation of £10,000 from the Bellahouston Trust, left from the will of Moses Stevens of Bellahouston. The building was designed by Charles Rennie Mackintosh, chosen for the commission by the school's director, Francis Newbery, who oversaw a period of expansion and fast-growing reputation. The first half of the building was completed in 1899 and the second half in 1909.

The School's campus has grown since that time and in 2009 an international architectural competition was held to find an architect-led design team who would develop the Campus Masterplan and design the Phase 1 building. The competition was won by New York-based Steven Holl Architects working with Glasgow-based JM Architects. The Reid Building was completed in 2014 and sits opposite the Mackintosh Building. It is a site previously occupied by the Foulis, Assembly and Newbery Tower Buildings.

The school has produced most of Scotland's leading contemporary artists including, since 2005, 30 per cent of Turner Prize nominees and six recent Turner Prize winners: Simon Starling in 2005, Richard Wright in 2009, Martin Boyce in 2011, Duncan Campbell in 2014, Charlotte Prodger in 2018,and Jasleen Kaur in 2024.

The School of Architecture is highly rated by the architecture profession and the School of Design has been described by Design Week as "leaders in design education".

The School is organised into four academic schools:

- The Mackintosh School of Architecture
- The School of Design
- The School of Fine Art
- The School of Innovation and Technology

GSA also has a long-established portfolio of non-degree art and design classes for children and adults delivered through GSA Open Studio.

Disciplines within the four schools include fine-art photography, painting and printmaking, sculpture and environmental art, product design, product-design engineering, textile design, fashion design, silversmithing and jewellery design, interior design, communication design, interaction design, and architecture.

== Governance ==
Governance of the Glasgow School of Art is the responsibility of its Board of Governors. The Board of Governors has ultimate responsibility for all the affairs of the School. GSA has four standard Board Meetings in its academic year, held in September, November, March and June.

== Fires and restoration ==
=== 2014 fire ===
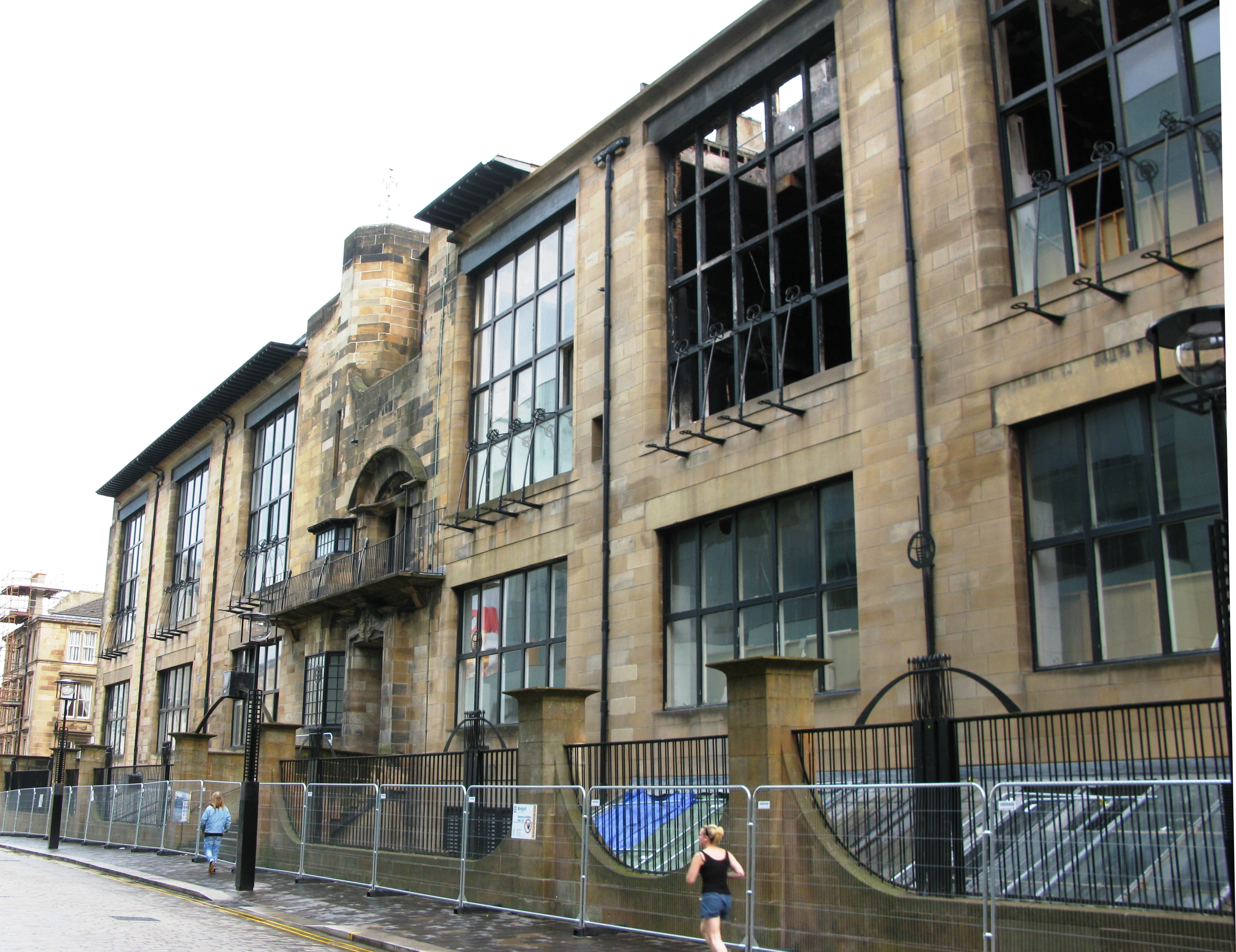
The façade of the Mackintosh building after the fire of 2014

The original Mackintosh building was severely damaged by fire on 23 May 2014. An initial fire service estimate was that 90 per cent of the building and 70 per cent of its contents had been saved. The fire, which began in the basement, quickly spread upwards and, although it was brought under control quite quickly, significant damage was done to the historic studios and stairways. The renowned Mackintosh library was destroyed; the archive was water damaged, but was able to be air and freeze dried. There were no casualties.

The fire broke out as students were preparing for their Degree Show. Eyewitnesses said that the fire appeared to have started when a projector exploded in the basement of the Charles Rennie Mackintosh building just before 12:40 pm. Investigators later determined that the cause was not a faulty projector, but "a canister of expanding foam" used in close proximity to a hot projector, causing flammable gases to ignite.

According to The Scotsman newspaper, the use of aerosol cans was against school policy. The report from the Scottish Fire and Rescue Service found that the design of the building contributed greatly to the spread of the fire: "the number of timber lined walls and voids, and original ventilation ducts running both vertically and horizontally throughout the building" as well as "a vertical service void", which "ran the entire height of the building … [and] allowed flames, hot gases, and smoke to travel". Fire and smoke dampers, which are intended to prevent the spread of fire and smoke through ducts, had not been retrofitted. In addition, an intended fire suppression system for the building had not been completed. A school staff member was on hand when the blaze first ignited, but was unable to contain the fast-spreading flames.

==== Restoration ====
A careful restoration process began soon after the fire; work on restoring and recreating the Mackintosh design, including the famous library interior, started in 2016. The restoration was performed with historical accuracy, including the use of original wood species such as longleaf pine and tulipwood.

=== 2018 fire ===
A second, much more severe fire broke out in the Mackintosh Building on 15 June 2018, causing extensive damage. The fire also caused severe damage to the nearby O2 ABC music venue, which later needed to be demolished in 2024. Emergency services received the first call at 11:19 pm BST, and 120 firefighters and 20 fire engines were dispatched to the fire. No casualties were reported. As of January 2022 the cause of the fire was not known.

Alan Dunlop, visiting professor of architecture at Robert Gordon University who studied at the Mackintosh School of Architecture, was contacted by the press immediately after the fire and stated: "I can't see any restoration possible for the building itself. It looks totally destroyed." This point of view was not supported by the early external building surveys, which appeared to indicate that much of the exterior had survived, though extensively damaged. Drone footage enabled a clearer assessment of the extent of the interior damage, and a programme of partial dismantling was established to stabilise the portions of the facade at risk of collapse, notably the south elevation. A Glasgow City Council spokesperson said: "There is a consensus emerging that the intention of the building control people, HES (Historic Environment Scotland) people and the art school is to save the building... Right now, people are operating on the understanding it will be saveable."

The first opportunity for the school administration to visit the site happened on 19 June 2018. Muriel Gray, chair of the Board of Governors, stated: "This was the first opportunity for the expert team to see the building and begin what will be a long and complex process of determining the future of the Mack, but we remain optimistic. There is a huge desire to see Mackintosh's masterpiece rise again, one which we all share. We have incredibly detailed information on the building collated over the last 4 years, and have worked with teams of talented craftspeople who were doing a tremendous job on the restoration." In a subsequent statement to the BBC, Professor Tom Inns, director of the school, affirmed that "This building is not beyond saving. It will be saved in some form." He continued to support his firm belief that the building should continue in its function as a working art school, rather than a museum.

In November 2018, Tom Inns wrote to the Scottish Parliament Culture, Tourism, Europe and External Affairs Committee suggesting that if the Mackintosh Building was to be rebuilt then an independent Mackintosh Building Trust should be established to oversee what will be one of Scotland’s biggest heritage projects over the next 5–7 years, costing in excess of £100 million. Tom Inns suggested this would allow the GSA Board of Governors and Executive team to focus on the task of running one of the world’s top art schools.

On 28 June 2018 it was announced that work was being planned to take down parts of the building that were in danger of collapse. Compensation for local residents and businesses was to be made available by the Scottish Government. The same day, Glasgow School of Art terminated its £25 million restoration contract with Kier Group following the fire.

At the time of the fire, sprinklers had yet to be installed in the building. Components for the fire suppression system had been delivered the day before, but were weeks away from assembly and testing.

In August 2020, Glasgow School of Art took legal action against Page\Park Architects, the Glasgow-based architectural practice responsible for the Mackintosh Building restoration work.

Between August 2018 and July 2020 over £12 million had been spent on Mackintosh Building debris clearance and stabilisation work.

In November 2020, Glasgow School of Art announced that work to clear debris from the Mackintosh Building would not be completed until 2021 and that work to repair fire damaged glazing and cladding on the Reid Building would not be completed until 2022.

In March 2021, the Board of Glasgow School of Art announced that a Project Development Board had been established for the restoration of the Mackintosh Building. This is chaired by the Director of the Art School who has assumed the role of project sponsor, is leading the works and is directly responsible for delivery. A Strategic Outline Business Case for the restoration was due to be drafted by late spring 2021 and completed by summer 2021. This would determine the programme to complete the works.

On 25 January 2022, the Scottish Fire and Rescue Service published the results of their three-and-a-half-year investigation in to the cause of the fire. No cause could be determined.

=== Future ===
Following a "faithful reinstatement", the Mackintosh building is due to fully reopen as a graduate school in 2030.

== Scottish Campuses ==
=== Glasgow Campus ===
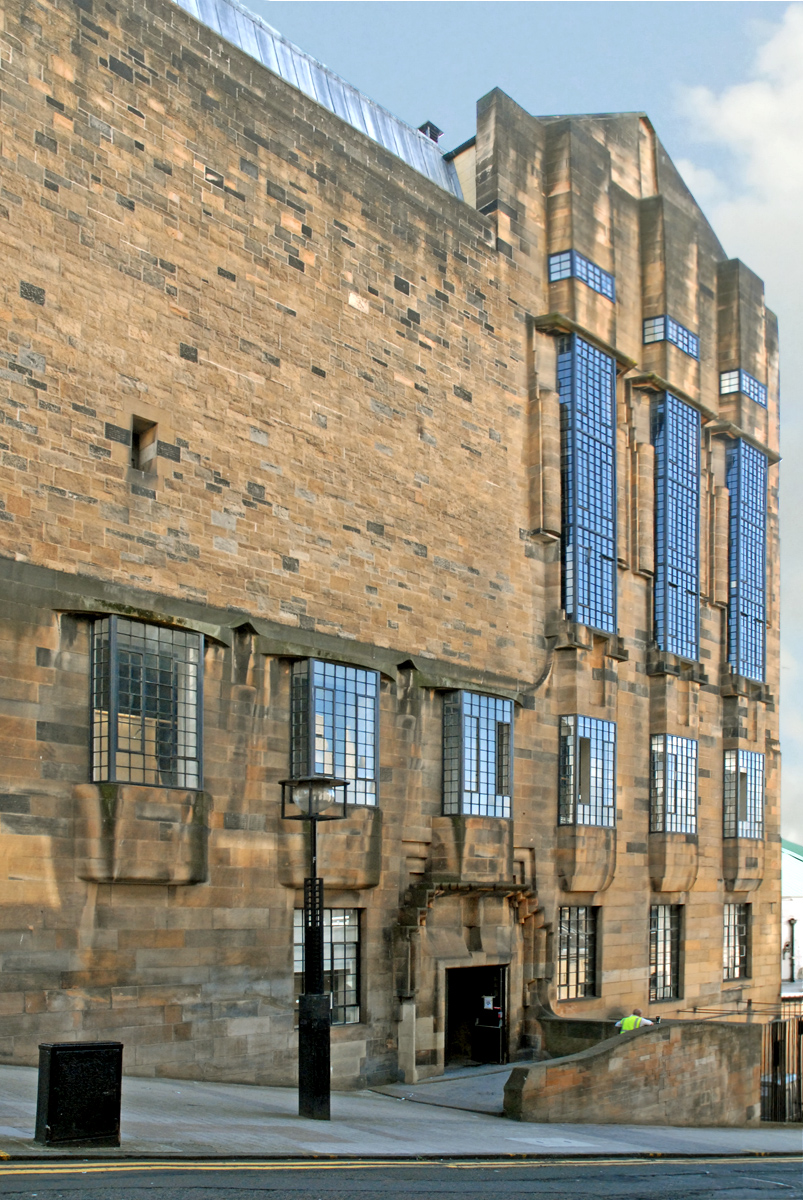
The western façade of the Mackintosh building in 2009

The school has a large footprint across Glasgow. From the date of the first fire of May 2014, until September 2019 the School of Fine Art was temporarily housed in a campus at the Tontine Building, Merchant City, Glasgow. The School of Design, The Innovation School and The Mackintosh School of Architecture, along with the GSA Library are all located in and around the Garnethill area, where the Mackintosh Building sits.

The Stow Building, bought from Kelvin College (hence retaining the name, Stow) - has been refurbished and fitted out. Stow opened to the general public for the first time for the 2019 degree show, and opened as a functioning academic building, housing all of the Fine Art courses, in September 2019.

The Mackintosh Building was the heart of the campus and continued to be a functioning part of the school until the first major fire on 23 May 2014. The building housed the Fine Art Painting department, first year studios and administrative staff. It houses the Mackintosh gallery which held many different exhibitions throughout the year. The Mackintosh Gallery (also known as the Mackintosh Museum) was the only part of the Mackintosh building open to the general public; all other areas of the school were only viewable by guided tour. An exception to this rule was the Degree Show where all the studios within the Mackintosh building were opened to allow people to view the graduating year's final artworks. while the Mackintosh Building underwent restoration and the newly acquired Stow Building is refurbished.

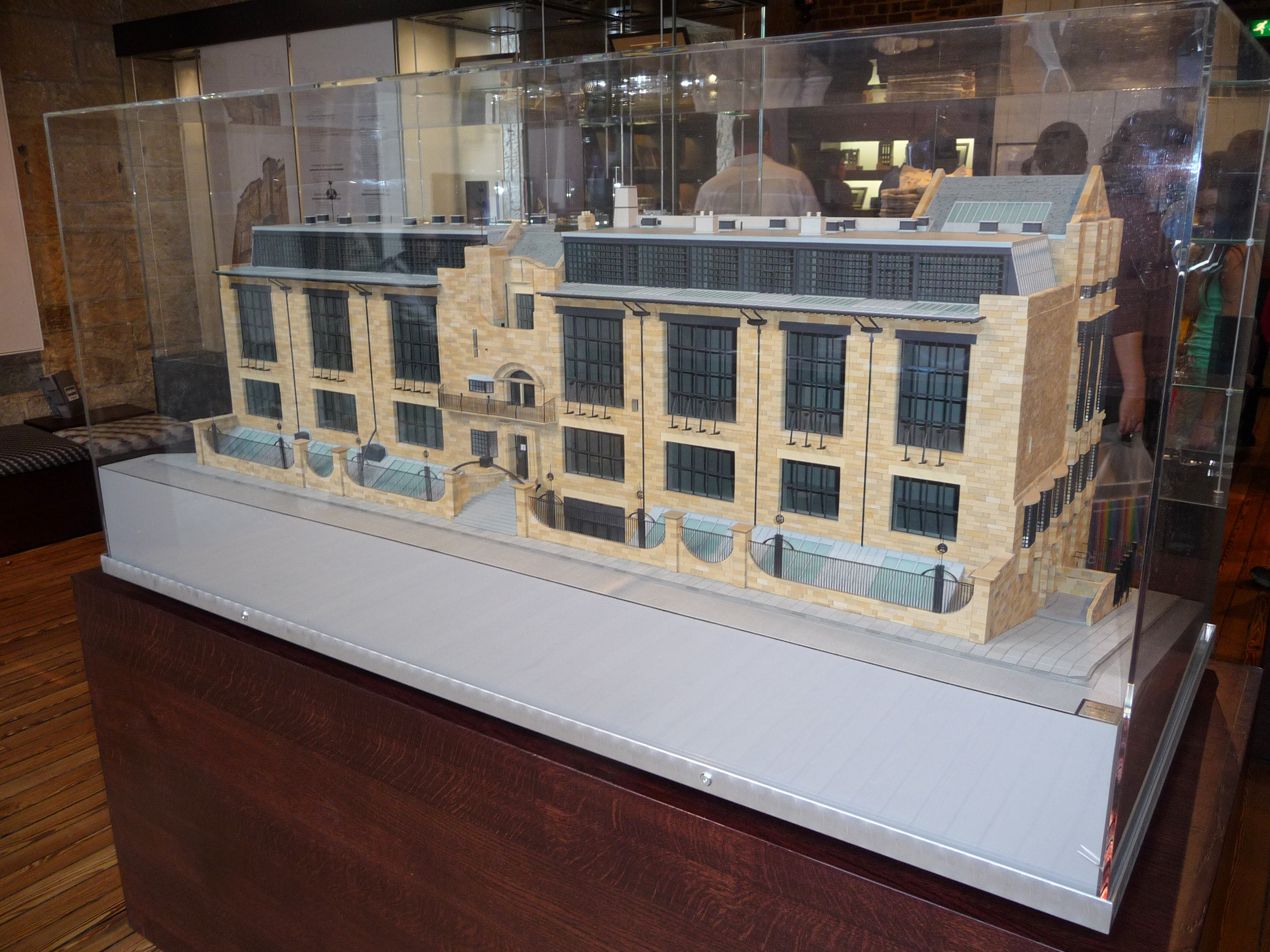
A scale model of the GSA's Mackintosh building

An international architectural competition was launched in March 2009 to find the design team to prepare a campus masterplan and detailed design of the first new building phase. The winner of the competition was Steven Holl Architects, working in partnership with Glasgow's JM Architects and Arup Engineering. Work commenced in 2011 and continued until 2013. The building was structurally complete in 2013. The new building was named the Reid Building after the Director who was in post at the time of the commissioning: Dame Seona Reid, and won Building of the Year at the 2014 Architects' Journal awards – the AJ100 Awards in May 2014, and the Award for Arts or Entertainment Structures at the IStructE's 2014 Structural Awards. It was awarded the Sir Hugh Casson Award in 2014 for the worst new building of the year, being described as a "crude and insufferably arrogant essay in minimalist neo-modernism".

=== Forres - Altyre Estate Campus ===
The Innovation School also has a base in Forres, Moray, focusing on research-led teaching at post-graduate level.

== Singapore Campus ==
From September 2012 until June 2021, the GSA delivered years 3 and 4 of its Bachelor of Arts (Hons) Programmes in Communication Design and Interior Design in Singapore, in partnership with the Singapore Institute of Technology (SIT), based at the Temasek Polytechnic Campus in Tampines. In 2019, it was mutually agreed to end the partnership one year early; the final cohort of Glasgow School of Art Singapore students graduated in June 2021.

The programmes enabled Diploma students from the Singapore Polytechnics to articulate from a Singapore Diploma to a GSA BA(Hons) degree.

Students who studied in Singapore benefited from the same programme of study and award as in the home institution, along with resources and equipment according to the GSA specifications.

== Students ==
The GSA has been ranked in the top 10 of specialist educational institutions in The Guardian University Guide, ranking it the top specialist visual arts institution in the UK. Its degrees are validated by the University of Glasgow. Of its 1,900 students, almost 20 per cent are international, 20 per cent from the rest of the UK and approximately 20 per cent are postgraduate. The GSA is placed 8th in the 2019 QS World Rankings for Art and Design and 2nd in the nationally ranking 2016 Complete University Guide league table for Art and Design. HESA statistics show the GSA to have one of the lowest student drop-out rates in the UK.

In May 2020 Glasgow School of Art undergraduate students wrote to the Scottish Government and the Quality Assurance Agency (QAA) to raise concerns about academic provision at Glasgow School of Art. That August, this was followed up by a group of Post-graduate students. The QAA investigated the situation and published a report in February 2021 making a series of recommendations to Glasgow School of Art and the University of Glasgow who award degrees at the Art School.

Despite high positions in the QS rankings, the quality of Glasgow School of Art's academic provision was criticised in a 2021 Enhancement Led Institutional Review. In April 2021 the UK's Quality Assurance Agency (QAA) wrote:

The review concluded that GSA has arrangements for managing academic standards and the student learning experience which are of limited effectiveness. This judgement means GSA does not currently meet sector expectations in relation to the arrangements it has in place for securing the academic standards of the awards it offers and enhancing the quality of the student learning experience it provides. GSA is asked to take action in a number of areas to ensure that quality and academic standards are not put at risk in the future.

Subsequently, in August 2022 the QAA published a re-review of the school in which they stated that "the School has effective arrangements for managing academic standards, and the student learning experience", commending the school for improving in a number of areas and making recommendations for further improvements.

In March 2016, the Commission on Widening Access (CoWA) found the percentage of Scottish-domiciled full-time first degree entrants from SIMD 20 (20 per cent most deprived areas of Scotland) at the GSA was 22.2 per cent. This is the second-highest in Scotland, according to CoWA's report, with only University of the West of Scotland having more. The most recent Scottish Funding Council report on widening participation highlighted the GSA continued to perform well in widening participation.

== Students' Association ==
The Glasgow School of Art Students' Association (GSASA) was formed in 1908 and was officially recognised by the GSA in 1948. The Association is a charitable non-profit organisation and is funded in part by GSA; it is not part of the National Union of Students.

At the start of each academic year, all students have the option of joining the Students' Association during enrolment. There are two full-time sabbatical officers, the Student President and the Events Convenor, and the Association has a students' representative council.

The Students' Association building was constructed in 1927, originally known as the Assembly Building. The whole building was handed over by the GSA to the Association in the late 20th century. The venue contains a bar and nightclub and over the decades established itself as a well-renowned venue in the local music scene.

== Research ==
The Glasgow School of Art is host to a number of high-profile research projects, funded primarily through the Arts and Humanities Research Council, the Engineering and Physical Sciences Research Council, and the Economic and Social Research Council, although other UK research councils have funded projects in the past.

At the Research Assessment Exercise in 2014, the GSA had the largest art and design research community in Scotland and with 23 per cent of research evaluated as world leading. The GSA has a number of research centres including the Digital Design Studio, Mackintosh Environmental Architectural Research Unit, Institute of Design Innovation, Centre for Advanced Textiles and the Glasgow Urban Lab In the 2021 Research Excellence Framework exercise 82% of the GSA's research was assessed to be internationally excellent. 75% of the GSA's research outputs were ranked at the two top grades 4* (world-leading in originality, significance and rigour), and 3* (or internationally excellent) with the GSA being one of the leading practice-based research institutions in the UK.

== Notable alumni ==
Alumni of the Glasgow School of Art are notable in painters, writers, film directors, photographers, designers, and architects.

== In popular culture ==
The Glasgow School of Art featured as a location in the first episode of the 1987 series Tutti Frutti, starring Emma Thompson and Robbie Coltrane.

== See also ==
- List of building or structure fires
- List of Category A listed buildings in Glasgow
