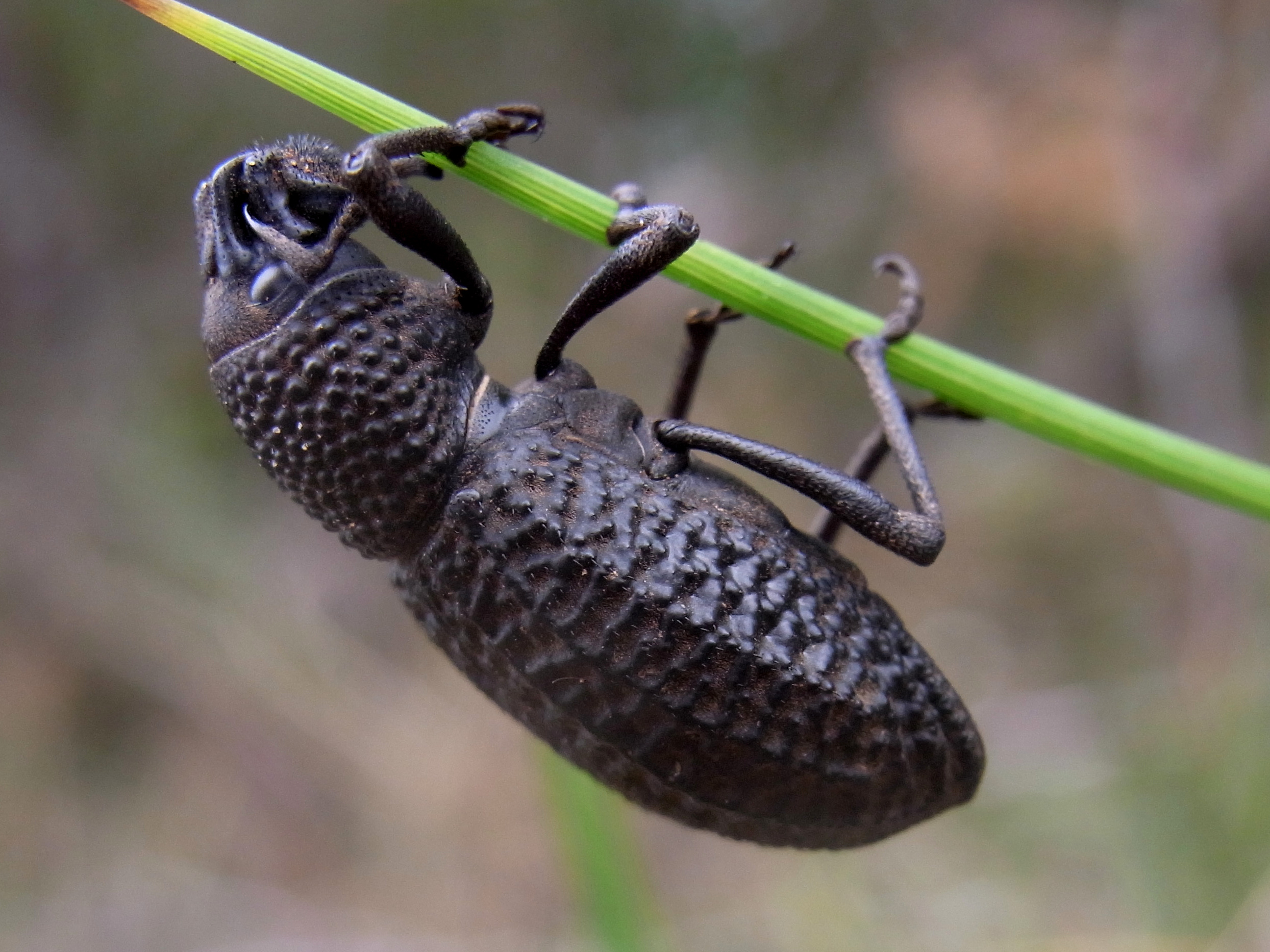

Scientific classification
- Kingdom: Animalia
- Phylum: Arthropoda
- Clade: Pancrustacea
- Class: Insecta
- Order: Coleoptera
- Suborder: Polyphaga
- Infraorder: Cucujiformia
- Superfamily: Curculionoidea
- Family: Curculionidae
- Genus: Talaurinus; MacLeay, 1865

= Talaurinus =

Genus of beetles

Talaurinus is a genus of weevils belonging to the family Curculionidae. The species of this genus are found in Australia. The genus first appeared in scientific literature in the Transactions of the Entomological Society of New South Wales, published by William MacLeay in 1865.

== Selected species ==
- Talaurinus confusus Ferguson 1914
- Talaurinus foveatus MacLeay 1865
- Talaurinus fergusoni Carter 1937
- Talaurinus hystrix Ferguson 1915
- Talaurinus perplexus Ferguson 1915
- Talaurinus regularis Sloane 1893
