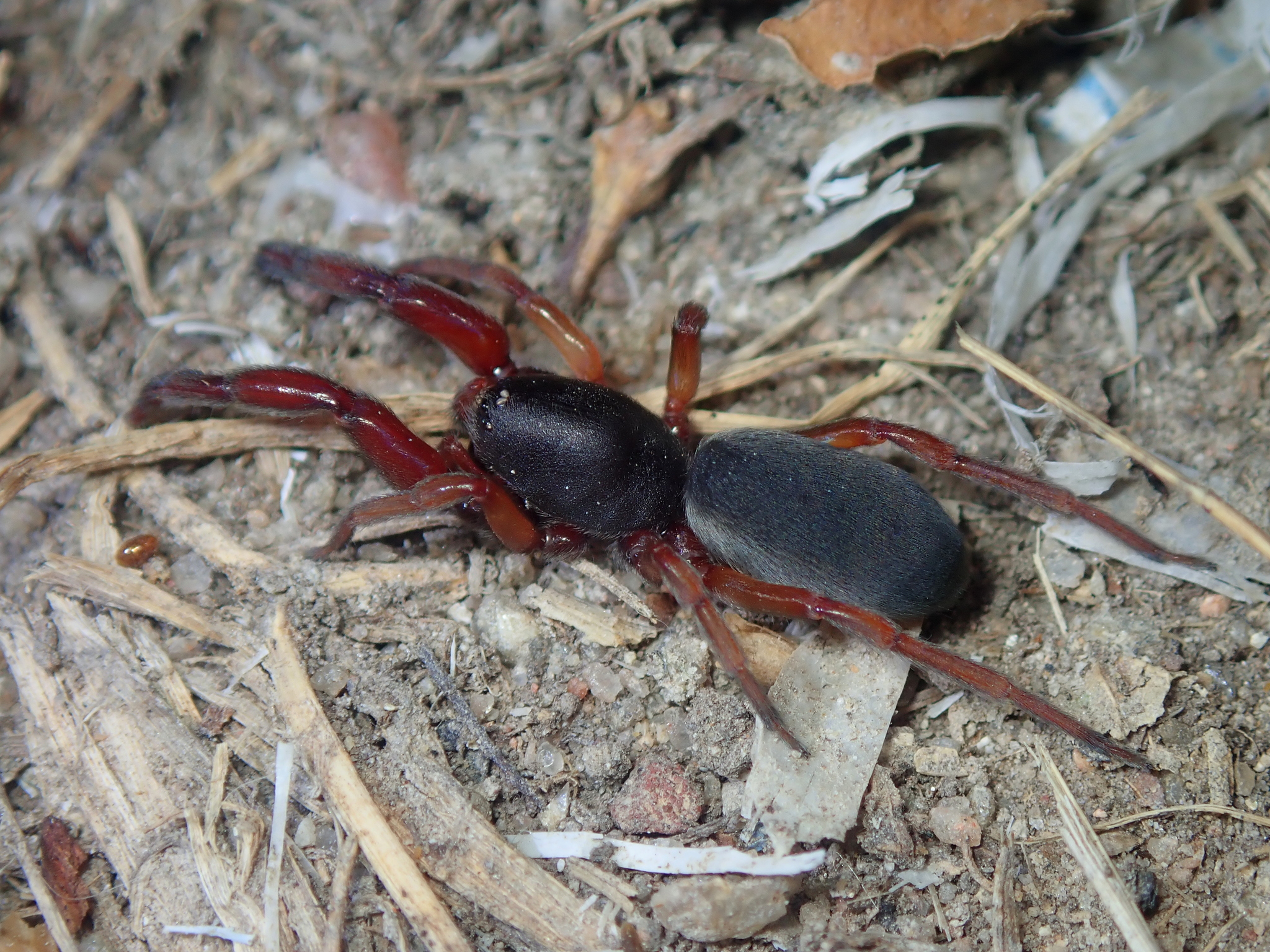
- Otiothops sp. in Brazil

Scientific classification
- Kingdom: Animalia
- Phylum: Arthropoda
- Subphylum: Chelicerata
- Class: Arachnida
- Order: Araneae
- Infraorder: Araneomorphae
- Family: Palpimanidae
- Genus: Otiothops; MacLeay, 1839

Type species
- O. walckenaeri MacLeay, 1839

Species
- 47, see text

Synonyms
- Iheringia Keyserling, 1891

= Otiothops =

Otiothops Temporal range: Neogene– Present

Genus of spiders

Otiothops is a genus of palp-footed spiders that was first described by W. S. MacLeay in 1839.

== Distribution ==
Spiders in this genus are found in South America, the Caribbean, and Panama:

== Species ==
As of January 2026, this genus includes 47 species:

- Otiothops alayoni Cala-Riquelme & Agnarsson, 2014 – Cuba
- Otiothops amazonicus Simon, 1887 – Colombia, Brazil
- Otiothops atalaia Castro, Baptista, Grismado & Ramírez, 2015 – Brazil
- Otiothops atlanticus Platnick, Grismado & Ramírez, 1999 – Brazil
- Otiothops baculus Platnick, 1975 – Brazil
- Otiothops besotes Cala-Riquelme & Agnarsson, 2018 – Colombia
- Otiothops birabeni Mello-Leitão, 1945 – Brazil, Argentina
- Otiothops brevis Simon, 1893 – Venezuela
- Otiothops calcaratus Mello-Leitão, 1927 – Colombia
- Otiothops chicaque Cala-Riquelme, Quijano-Cuervo & Agnarsson, 2018 – Colombia
- Otiothops clavus Platnick, 1975 – Brazil
- Otiothops contus Platnick, 1975 – Brazil
- Otiothops curua Brescovit, Bonaldo & Barreiros, 2007 – Brazil
- Otiothops doctorstrange Cala-Riquelme & Quijano-Cuervo, 2018 – Colombia
- Otiothops dubius Mello-Leitão, 1927 – Brazil
- Otiothops facis Platnick, 1975 – Brazil
- Otiothops franzi Wunderlich, 1999 – Venezuela
- Otiothops fulvus (Mello-Leitão, 1932) – Brazil
- Otiothops germaini Simon, 1927 – Brazil
- Otiothops giralunas Grismado, 2002 – Guyana
- Otiothops goloboffi Grismado, 1996 – Argentina
- Otiothops gounellei Simon, 1887 – Brazil
- Otiothops goytacaz Castro, Baptista, Grismado & Ramírez, 2015 – Brazil
- Otiothops helena Brescovit & Bonaldo, 1993 – Brazil
- Otiothops hoeferi Brescovit & Bonaldo, 1993 – Brazil
- Otiothops iguazu Grismado, 2008 – Argentina
- Otiothops inflatus Platnick, 1975 – Paraguay, Argentina
- Otiothops intortus Platnick, 1975 – Trinidad
- Otiothops kathiae Piacentini, Ávila, Pérez & Grismado, 2013 – Bolivia
- Otiothops kochalkai Platnick, 1978 – Colombia
- Otiothops lajeado Buckup & Ott, 2004 – Brazil
- Otiothops loris Platnick, 1975 – Peru
- Otiothops luteus (Keyserling, 1891) – Brazil
- Otiothops macleayi Banks, 1929 – Panama, Colombia
- Otiothops naokii Piacentini, Ávila, Pérez & Grismado, 2013 – Bolivia
- Otiothops oblongus Simon, 1892 – St. Vincent, Trinidad, Venezuela, Guyana, Brazil
- Otiothops payak Grismado & Ramírez, 2002 – Argentina
- Otiothops pentucus Chickering, 1968 – Virgin Islands
- Otiothops pilleus Platnick, 1975 – Brazil
- Otiothops platnicki Wunderlich, 1999 – Brazil
- Otiothops puraquequara Brescovit, Bonaldo & Barreiros, 2007 – Brazil
- Otiothops recurvus Platnick, 1976 – Brazil
- Otiothops setosus Mello-Leitão, 1927 – Brazil
- Otiothops typicus (Mello-Leitão, 1927) – Brazil
- Otiothops vaupes Cala-Riquelme, Quijano-Cuervo & Agnarsson, 2018 – Colombia
- Otiothops walckenaeri MacLeay, 1839 – Bahama Islands, Cuba
- Otiothops whitticki Mello-Leitão, 1940 – Guyana
