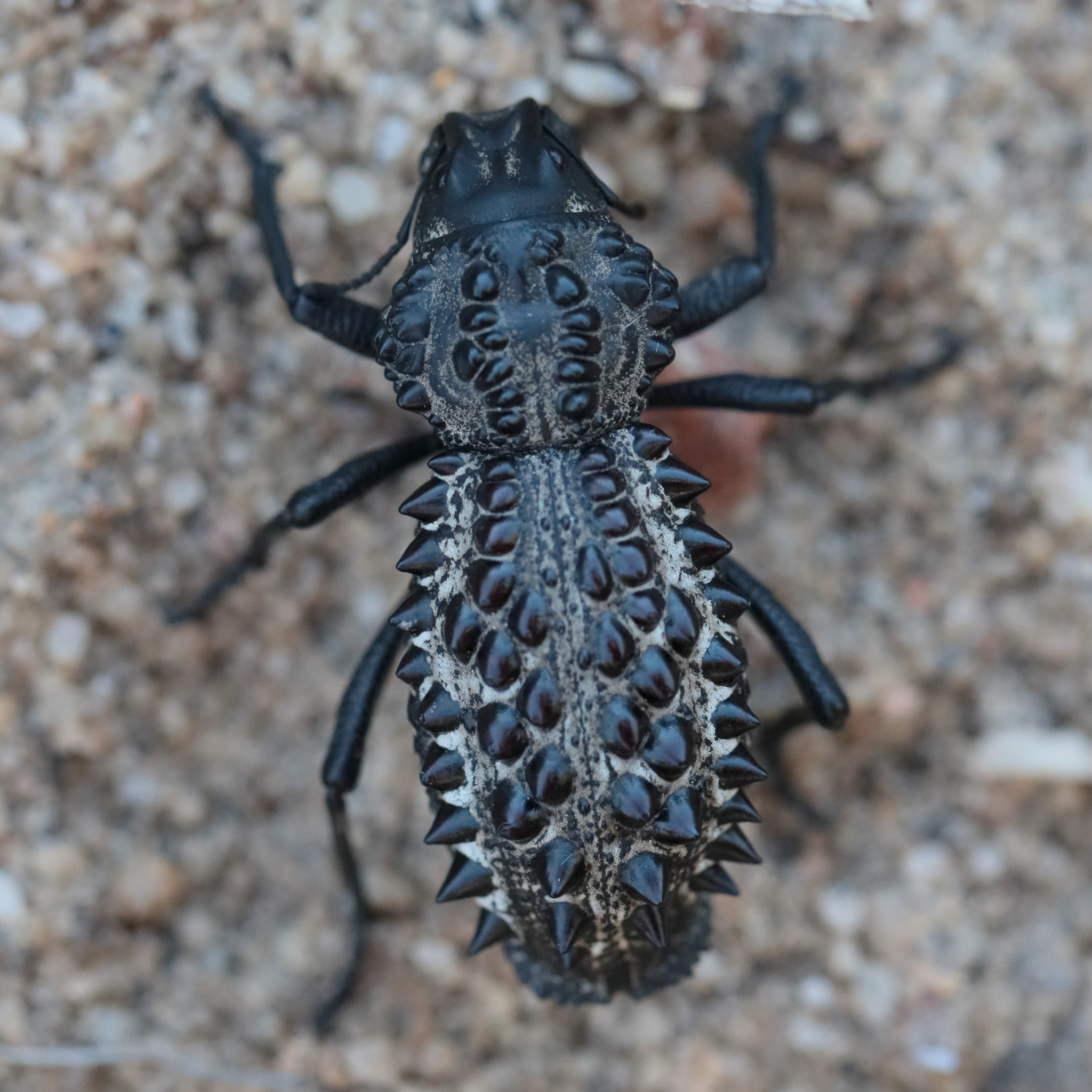

Scientific classification
- Kingdom: Animalia
- Phylum: Arthropoda
- Clade: Pancrustacea
- Class: Insecta
- Order: Coleoptera
- Suborder: Polyphaga
- Infraorder: Cucujiformia
- Superfamily: Curculionoidea
- Family: Curculionidae
- Genus: Gagatophorus
- Species: G. tibialis

Binomial name
- Gagatophorus tibialis (Ferguson, 1914)

Synonyms
- Macramycterus tibialis Ferguson, 1914

= Gagatophorus tibialis =

Species of weevil

Gagatophorus tibialis is a weevil in the Amycterini tribe of the Curculionidae family, endemic to Western Australia.

The species was first described by Eustace William Ferguson in 1914 as Macramycterus tibialis, from a specimen collected at Shark Bay, Western Australia, and was transferred to the genus, Gagatophorus, in 1993 by Elwood Curtin Zimmerman.
