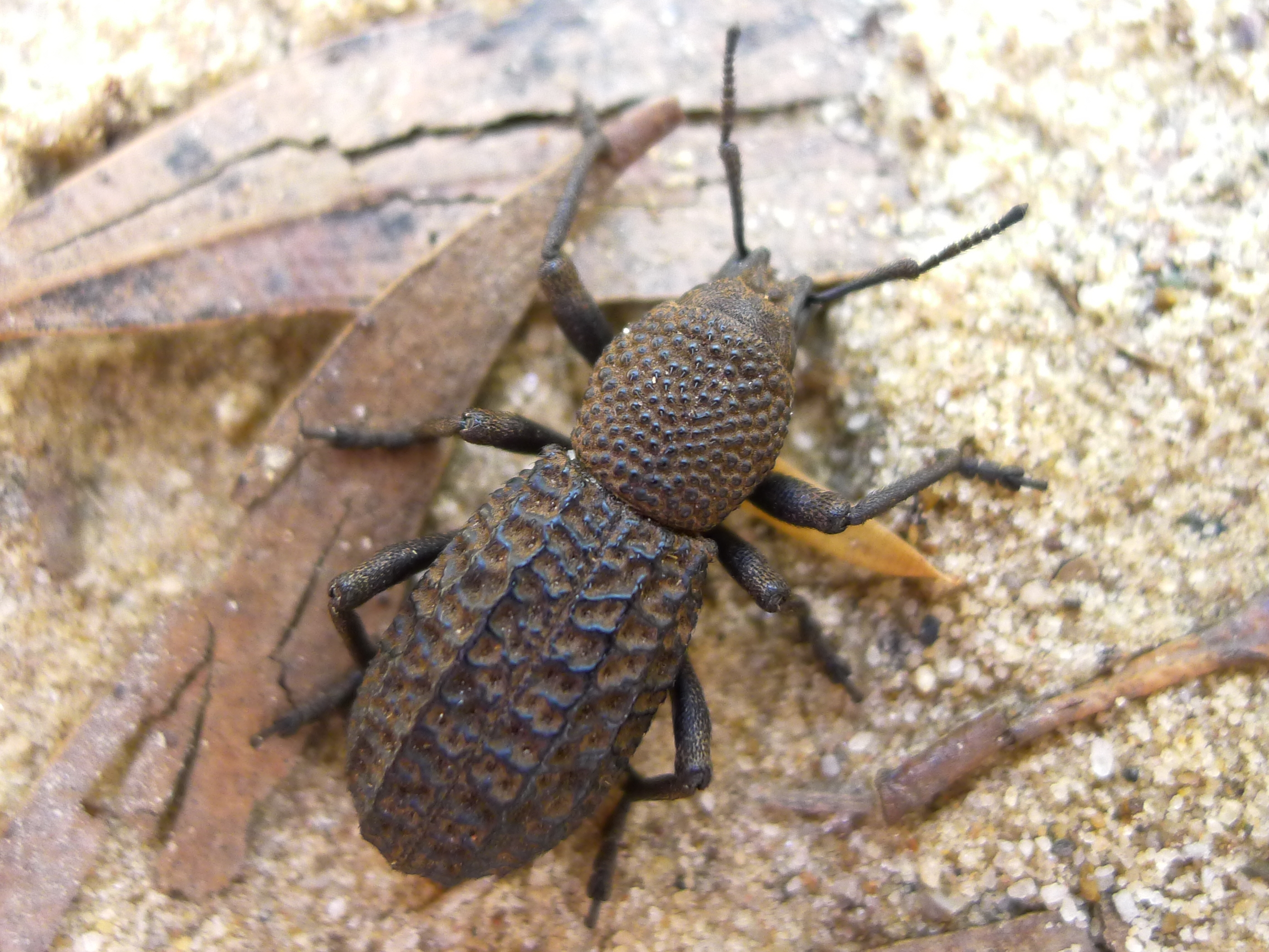

Scientific classification
- Domain: Eukaryota
- Kingdom: Animalia
- Phylum: Arthropoda
- Class: Insecta
- Order: Coleoptera
- Suborder: Polyphaga
- Infraorder: Cucujiformia
- Family: Curculionidae
- Genus: Talaurinus
- Species: T. foveatus

Binomial name
- Talaurinus foveatus MacLeay, 1865

= Talaurinus foveatus =

Species of weevil

Talaurinus foveatus is a species of weevil found in Australia. Often seen up to 20 mm long with a hard exoskeleton. This insect first appeared in scientific literature in the Transactions of the Entomological Society of New South Wales, published by William MacLeay in 1865. The specific epithet foveatus is derived from the Latin fovea, "having small holes or cavities; pitted".

== Gallery ==
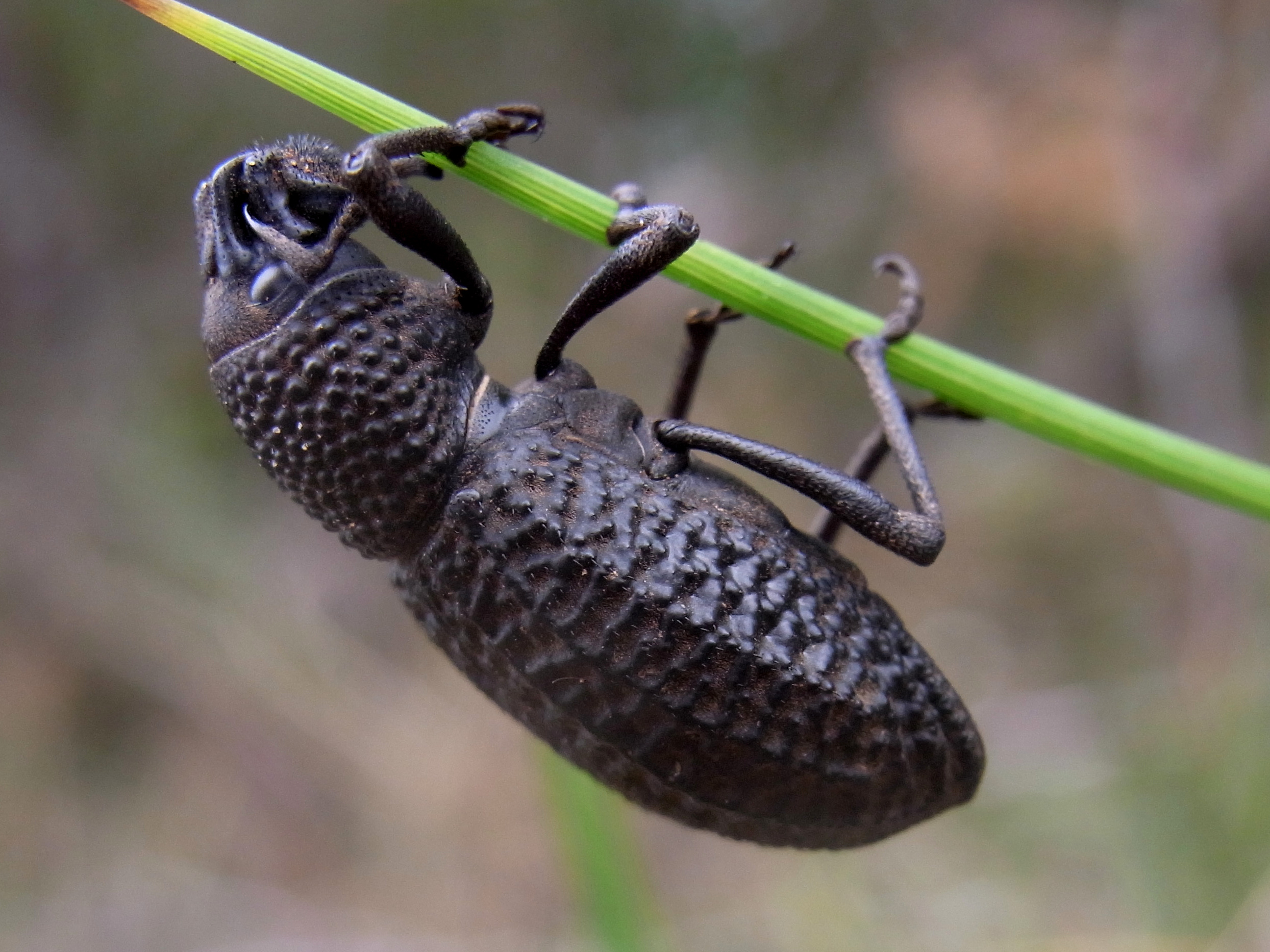
Talaurinus foveatus
