= Amycterus =

Scientific classification
- Domain: Eukaryota
- Kingdom: Animalia
- Phylum: Arthropoda
- Class: Insecta
- Order: Coleoptera
- Suborder: Polyphaga
- Infraorder: Cucujiformia
- Family: Curculionidae
- Tribe: Amycterini
- Genus: Amycterus; Schoenherr, 1823

Type species
- Amycterus talpa Schoenherr, 1823

Synonyms
- Phalidura; Psalidura; Aphalidura; Eustatius; Prophalidura

Genus of weevils

Amycterus is a genus of weevils belonging to the Amycterini tribe in the family Curculionidae, first described by Carl Johan Schönherr in 1823. The decisions for synonymy are based on work by Alonso-Zarazaga, M.A. and Lyal, C.H.C. and Elwood Zimmerman (Aphalidura, Eustatius, Prophalidura).

The species of this genus are found in New South Wales, Victoria, Queensland the Northern Territory, and Tasmania.

== Species ==
Species listed in the Australian Faunal Directory are:

- Amycterus abnormis (Macleay, 1865)
- Amycterus amplicollis (Ferguson, 1909)
- Amycterus amplipennis (Ferguson, 1909)
- Amycterus anthracoides (Ferguson, 1921)
- Amycterus brevicaudus (Ferguson, 1914)
- Amycterus breviformis (Ferguson, 1909)
- Amycterus carteri (Ferguson, 1909)
- Amycterus caudatus (Macleay, 1865)
- Amycterus cultratus (Ferguson, 1909)
- Amycterus cuneicaudatus (Ferguson, 1909)
- Amycterus decipiens (Dohrn, 1872)
- Amycterus durvillei Boheman, 1842
- Amycterus elongatus (Macleay, 1865)
- Amycterus exasperatus Erichson, 1842
- Amycterus exasperatus Erichson, 1842
- Amycterus falciformis (Macleay, 1865)
- Amycterus fergusoni (Sharp, 1920)
- Amycterus flavosetosus (Ferguson, 1909)
- Amycterus flavovarius (Ferguson, 1909)
- Amycterus forficulatus (Macleay, 1865)
- Amycterus foveatus (Macleay, 1865)
- Amycterus frenchi (Ferguson, 1909)
- Amycterus helmsi (Ferguson, 1914)
- Amycterus hopsoni (Ferguson, 1921)
- Amycterus kosciuskoanus (Ferguson, 1909)
- Amycterus leai (Ferguson, 1915)
- Amycterus mastersii (Macleay, 1865)
- Amycterus metasternalis (Ferguson, 1909)
- Amycterus mirabilis (Kirby, 1819)
- Amycterus mirabundus Gyllenhal, 1834
- Amycterus impressus Boisduval, 1835
- Amycterus crenatus Boisduval, 1835
- Amycterus miraculus (Macleay, 1865)
- Amycterus mirus Boheman, 1842
- Amycterus paradoxus Sturm, 1843
- Amycterus monticola (Ferguson, 1909)
- Amycterus morbillosus Boisduval, 1835
- Amycterus orthodoxus (Lea, 1910)
- Amycterus panduriformis (Ferguson, 1912)
- Amycterus perlatus (Ferguson, 1909)
- Amycterus pilbara Peterson, 2013
- Amycterus posticus Boisduval, 1835
- Amycterus rayneri (Macleay, 1865)
- Amycterus riverinae (Macleay, 1865)
- Amycterus rufipes (Blackburn, 1896)
- Amycterus sloanei (Ferguson, 1909)
- Amycterus squalidus Boheman, 1842
- Amycterus subcostatus (Macleay, 1865)
- Amycterus sublaevigatus (Ferguson, 1909)
- Amycterus sulcipennis (Ferguson, 1909)
- Amycterus talpa Schoenherr, 1823
- Amycterus reticulatus Boisduval, 1835
- Amycterus gyllenhali Dohrn, 1871
- Amycterus taylori (Ferguson, 1914)
- Amycterus tenebricosus (Ferguson, 1912)
- Amycterus tessellatus (Pascoe, 1874)
- Amycterus tomentosus Boisduval, 1835
- Amycterus morbillosus Erichson, 1842
- Amycterus variegatus (Macleay, 1865)
- Amycterus variolosus (Ferguson, 1909)
- Amycterus wilcoxii (Macleay, 1865)
