= Fanny Macleay =

English botanical illustrator

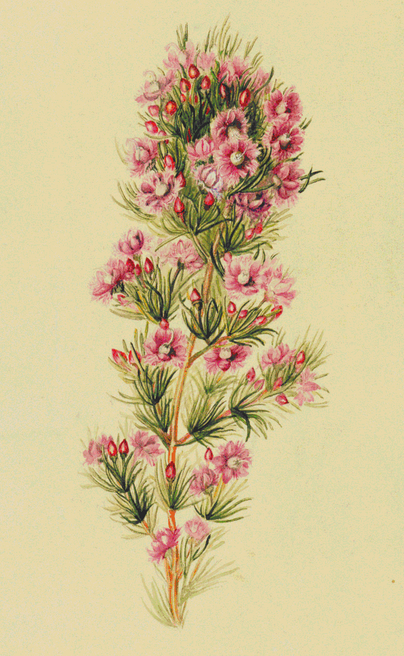
- A watercolour painting of Australian featherflowers by Fanny Macleay (held by the Natural History Museum, London)
- Born: Frances Leonora Macleay; 9 November 1793; London, England
- Died: 8 August 1836 (aged 42); Sydney, New South Wales
- Known for: Botanical illustration
- Spouse: Thomas Cudbert Harrington

Signature
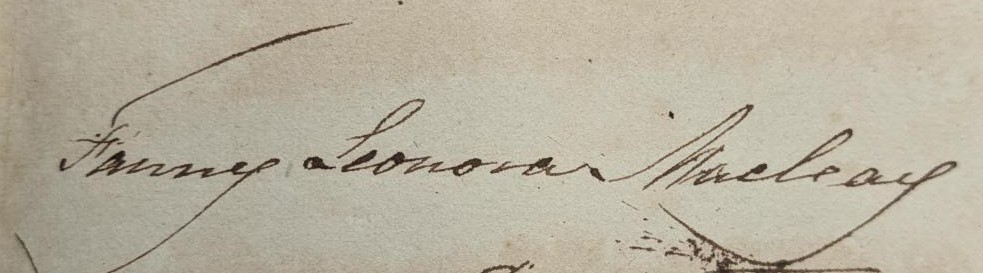

Frances Leonora "Fanny" Macleay (9 November 1793 – 8 August 1836) was an English-born Australian botanical illustrator, and member of the prominent Macleay family.

== Early life ==
Macleay was born on 9 November 1793 in London, England to Alexander Macleay and Elizabeth "Eliza" Macleay (née Barclay). Her father worked in the British civil service, taking up a position of Secretary of the Transport board. Of her many brothers and sisters, Fanny was closest to her brother William, who she wrote to often throughout her life.

While she grew up in an intellectual household, Macleay was not afforded the same kind of education as her older brother, and often bemoaned the ineptitude of her governesses in her letters to him. Her father, a noted entomologist and Fellow of the Linnean Society, encouraged his daughters to learn botany, entomology, zoology, and ornithology from the books in his library.

Of the many skills she learned as a girl, Macleay loved most to draw. Alexander sent Fanny for lessons with the French natural history artist Pelletier, to better improve her drawing to assist with his scientific collections. Travelling between their residence in London and country house in Surrey gave her access to the best drawing masters, and she soon became an accomplished flower painter. Her drawings and still-life paintings were exhibited at the Royal Academy of Arts in 1816, 1819, and 1824.

Her father's position in the science community meant Macleay met such prominent scientists as Robert Brown and William Kirby. It was Kirby who first recognised her ability to draw, noticing her talent and requesting she draw specimens for him.

== Life in New South Wales ==
When the Transport Board was abolished 1815, Alexander Macleay was left with a meager pension to support his large family. As his scientific pursuits brought the family into more debt, it was Fanny who encouraged her father to accept the offer of a position as Colonial Secretary of New South Wales. The Macleay family sailed from England in 1825, arriving in Sydney in January 1826 on board The Marquis of Hastings.

Their elite position in the new colony ensured their frequent attendance at many balls and parties. Macleay wrote to her brother about being invited to Government House at least twice a week. She became good friends with the Governor's wife, Eliza Darling, who tried unsuccessfully to arrange a match between Fanny and her brother, Henry Dumaresq.

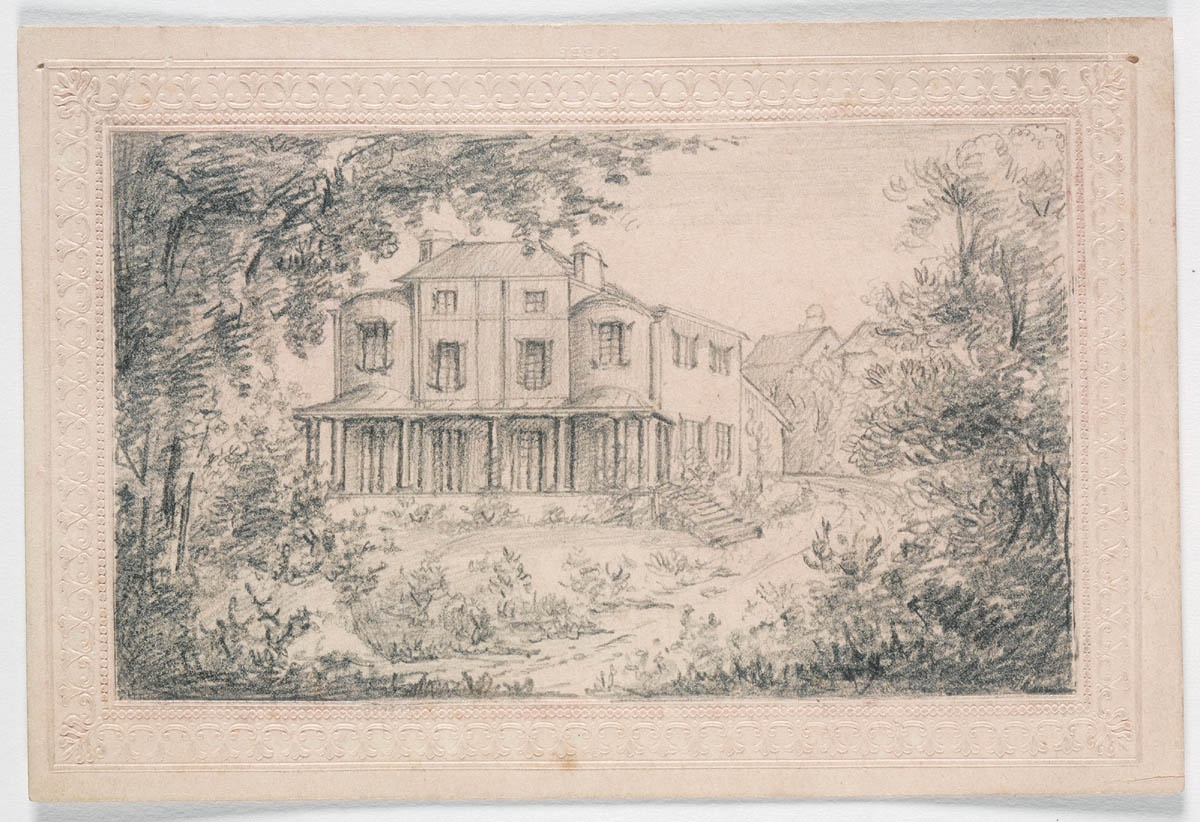
A drawing of their residence in Sydney, the Colonial Secretary's House, by Fanny Macleay (held by the Mitchell Collection, State Library of New South Wales)

At the behest of Eliza, Fanny and her sisters helped to establish and take positions at the newly opened Female School of Industry. The institution was intended to take young girls living in poverty and educate them to become domestic servants. As Macleay became more involved in the running of the school, she lamented that her position, along with her home duties, took away from her love for drawing.

== Work in science ==
As the oldest girl, Macleay was expected to help raise her younger siblings and assist her mother with domestic chores. The constant childbearing and various illnesses of the children made Eliza heavily dependent on her. However, in the Macleay household, domestic concerns often came second to scientific pursuits, with Fanny spending much time assisting her father with his collecting of specimens.

The work of drawing, recording, displaying and storing specimens, as well as sending them for exchange to other scientists around the world often fell to Macleay. She dried and labelled seeds, presenting them in albums to send overseas to William. Fanny also made drawings of specimens for the work of her father and brother.

Having such proximity to distinguished scientists meant Macleay was often pioneering the documentation of new species, with Robert Brown publishing On the Organs and Mode of Fecundation in Orchideae and Asclepiadeae in 1828 when Fanny herself had first drawn the orchids two years earlier.

Despite her passion for science and her proficiency as a natural history artist, Macleay was destined for her work to only be seen in the context of Alexander and William's scientific accomplishments. Membership of the Royal Society was forbidden for women at the time, and their work could only be read aloud by a man.

The work of cataloguing, storing, and preserving specimens by Macleay is present in one of the most extensive natural history collections in the world, which would later be acquired by the University of Sydney and form the Macleay Museum.

== Relationship to Robert Brown ==
Macleay first met the botanist Robert Brown as a young girl, when in 1814 he was invited to stay at her family's country house at Tilbuster Lodge. Brown was the editor of Curtis's Botanical Magazine, and over the years Fanny sent him her drawings with the hope for their inclusion.

It was said that Brown was in love with Fanny, but she rejected his proposal. Her mother, who depended on her daughter to help her with the children, discouraged the match. Their shared passion for science making them equally suited, Eliza later expressed regret at her interference.

She and Brown continued to exchange letters throughout their lives, with Macleay considering him to be her family. Upon her death, Brown was said to be stricken with grief, even writing to her mother to express his condolences.

== Marriage and death ==
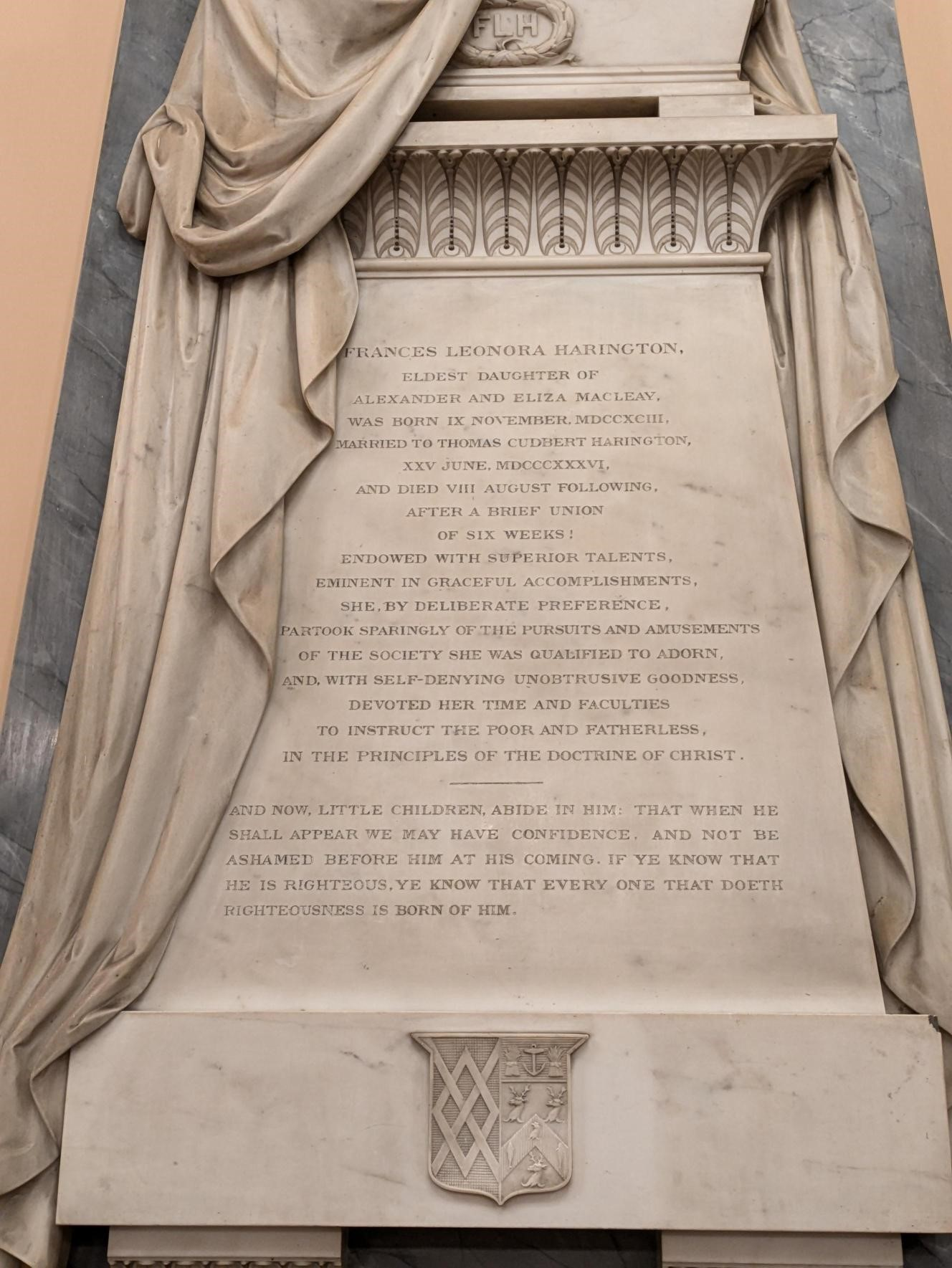
Monument to Fanny Macleay in St James Church, Sydney

Despite her mother's marriage scheming in the matches of the younger Macleay sisters, Fanny remained unmarried until her forties. Her prospective husband, Thomas Harrington, was Chief Deputy in her father's office. Initially interested in her sister Christina, Harrington came to realise that Fanny was cleverer.

Her brother George did not have pleasant things to say about Harrington, describing him as a "half-caste Indian" and that his sister is "not the person in my opinion to submit to the inconvenience of poverty in a cottage". This did not sway Macleay, who was finally in love, and had kept the very first note Harrington had sent her in 1830. They married at St James' Church, Sydney on 26 June 1836.

The newly married couple honeymooned at Brownlow Hill for only three weeks before Fanny fell ill, her stomach pains and heart palpitations requiring her to be looked after at home by family. She died three weeks later on 8 August 1836.

Her father Alexander, was devastated by her death. His work suffered as a consequence, and he would be ousted from office by his political enemies the following year. Of their relationship, Eliza said "She had been his Companion in his pursuits."
