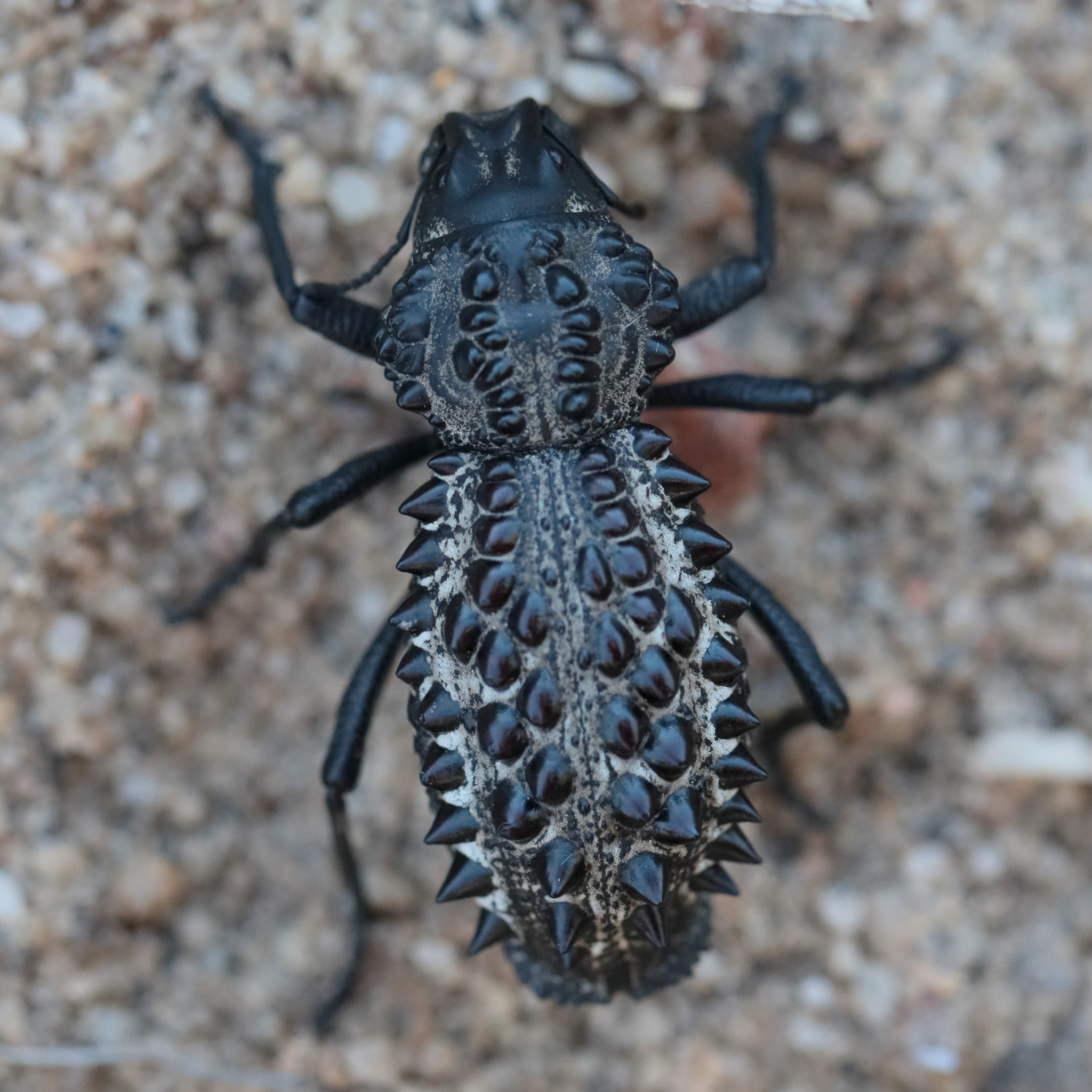
- Gagatophorus tibialis

Scientific classification
- Domain: Eukaryota
- Kingdom: Animalia
- Phylum: Arthropoda
- Class: Insecta
- Order: Coleoptera
- Suborder: Polyphaga
- Infraorder: Cucujiformia
- Family: Curculionidae
- Subfamily: Cyclominae
- Tribe: Amycterini; Waterhouse, 1854

Genera
- See text

= Amycterini =

Tribe of beetles

Amycterini is a tribe of beetles in the subfamily Cyclominae.

== Genera ==
Acantholophus - Acherres - Achorostoma - Aedriodes - Alexirhea - Amorphorhinus - Amycterus - Anascoptes - Antalaurinus - Atychoria - Brachyrothus - Chriotyphus - Cubicorhynchus - Cucullothorax - Dialeptopus - Dicherotropis - Ennothus - Euomella - Euomus - Gagatophorus - Hyborrhinus - Hypotomops - Lataurinus - Melanegis - Molochtus - Myotrotus - Mythites - Neohyborrhynchus - Notonophes - Oditesus - Ophthalamycterus - Parahyborrhynchus - Pseudonotonophes - Sclerorinus - Sclerorrhinella - Sosytelus - Talaurinellus - Talaurinus - Tetralophus - Xenommamycterus
