= Alexander Macleay =

Australian politician and naturalist

The Honourable Alexander Macleay MLC FLS FRS
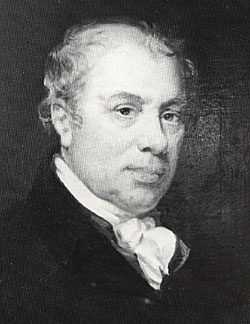
- Born: 24 June 1767; Ross-shire, Scotland
- Died: 18 July 1848 (aged 81); New South Wales
- Other name: Alexander McLeay
- Occupation: Chief Secretary of New South Wales
- Known for: Lepidopterology

Alexander Macleay MLC FLS FRS (24 June 1767 – 18 July 1848) was a Scottish-Australian leading member of the Linnean Society, a fellow of the Royal Society and member of the New South Wales Legislative Council.

== Life ==
Macleay was born in Ross-shire, Scotland, eldest son of William Macleay, provost of Wick. Alexander had a classical education, before relocating to London and becoming a wine merchant with his business partner William Sharp – after whom his first son was named. In 1795 he was elected a fellow of the Linnean Society of London, also serving as its secretary, and was also appointed chief clerk in the prisoners of war office. When the office was linked with the Transport Board after war broke out, Macleay became head of the correspondence department and by 1806 secretary. The board was abolished in 1815, and Macleay retired on an annual pension, of £750.

Macleay's chief natural history interest was entomology, principally lepidoptery, and he possessed the finest and most extensive collection then existing of any private individual in England and possibly the world. This included the British Collection of John Curtis now housed in Melbourne, Australia. In 1813, he was elected a foreign member of the Royal Swedish Academy of Sciences.

On 14 June 1825, Macleay was appointed Colonial Secretary for New South Wales. He arrived in Sydney in January 1826, with his wife Eliza, 9 of his 10 surviving children, and his extensive collection. He was soon working twelve-hour days and on 17 July 1825 was nominated to the New South Wales Legislative and Executive Councils, holding both positions until December 1836. Macleay represented Counties of Gloucester, Macquarie, and Stanley in the partially elected legislative council from June 1843 until 19 June 1848, a month before his death. Originally residing at the Colonial Secretary's House in Macquarie Place, Macleay was granted land at Elizabeth Bay by Governor Ralph Darling, where he constructed Elizabeth Bay House and laid out an extensive botanic garden.

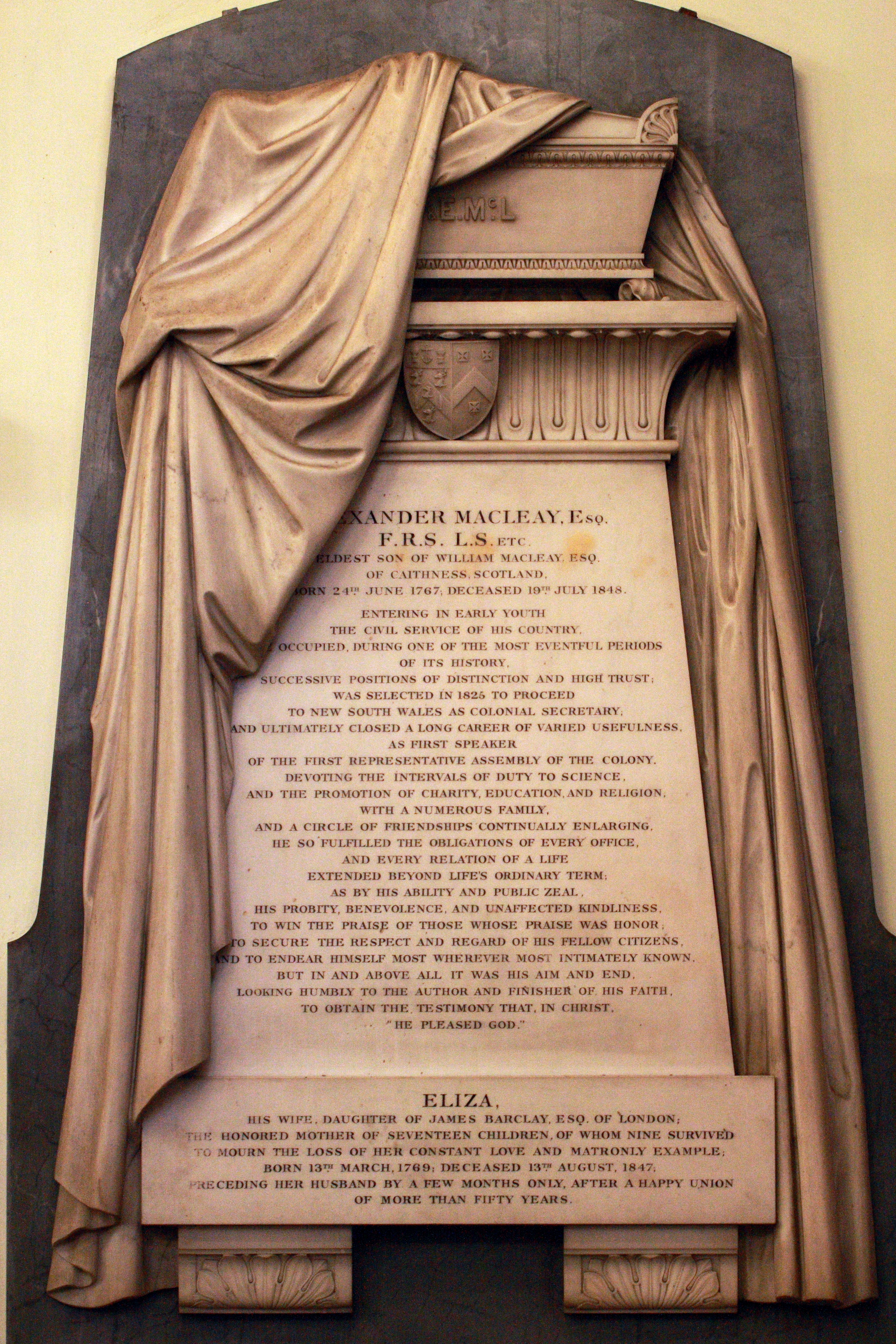
A memorial to Macleay on the wall of St James' Church, Sydney

His extensive entomological collections formed the basis of the Macleay Museum at the University of Sydney.

Macleay was also very active beyond his scientific pursuits and was the foundation president of the Australian Club.

== Family ==
Macleay married Miss Eliza Barclay of Urie. Her memorial in St James Church states that Eliza gave birth to 17 children, of whom nine survived.

Macleay was the father of the entomologist William Sharp Macleay, who expanded his father's collection, and of George Macleay, also a zoologist. William John Macleay, his nephew, was also an explorer and collector in Australia and New Guinea.

His daughter, Frances Leonora "Fanny" Macleay (1793-1836), was a botanical illustrator.

His daughter Rosa Roberta married Arthur Pooley Onslow; her children included Arthur Alexander Walton Onslow and Sir Alexander Onslow. Another daughter, Christiana Susan, married William Dumaresq, and their daughter Susan Frances Sophia was the wife of Queensland sugar industry pioneer and politician, Louis Hope.

Government offices
Preceded by Frederick Goulburn	Colonial Secretary of New South Wales; 1825 – 1837	Succeeded by Edward Deas Thomson
New South Wales Legislative Council
New parliament	Speaker of the Legislative Council; 1843 – 1846	Succeeded by Charles Nicholson
New parliament	Member for Counties of Gloucester, Macquarie, and Stanley; 1843 – 1848	Succeeded by Kenneth Snodgrass
