= Acantholophus =

Scientific classification
- Domain: Eukaryota
- Kingdom: Animalia
- Phylum: Arthropoda
- Class: Insecta
- Order: Coleoptera
- Suborder: Polyphaga
- Infraorder: Cucujiformia
- Family: Curculionidae
- Subfamily: Cyclominae
- Tribe: Amycterini
- Genus: Acantholophus; Boisduval, 1835

Genus of beetles

Acantholophus is a genus of beetles belonging to the family Curculionidae.

The species of this genus are found in Australia.

== Species ==
Species:

- Acantholophus adelaidae Waterhouse, 1854
- Acantholophus alpicola Ferguson, 1915
- Acantholophus ambiguus Zimmerman, 1993
