= Kenneth Adie Ferguson =

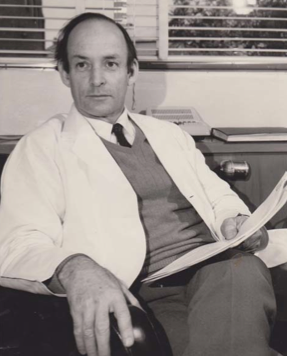
c. 1972, Prospect, CSIRO Laboratory, NSW, Australia

Kenneth Adie Ferguson (6 April 1921 – 15 April 2011) was an Australian veterinary scientist.

== Family ==
Ferguson was born in Wahroonga, the fourth child of Eustace William Ferguson and Jessie Perry. He married Helen McVicar, veterinarian (born 1925 in Manly, NSW) in 1946 and they had five children, Deborah, Maggie Ferguson, Kate, John and Angus. They lived at West Pennant Hills in North-western Sydney, moving to Canberra in 1974 and eventually Newcastle in 2008, where he died in 2011.

== Education ==
- Primary: Mowbray House School, Chatswood, NSW
- Secondary: Sydney Grammar School
- Tertiary: University of Sydney
- Post graduate: Christ's College 1948-1951, Cambridge. Doctor of Philosophy. Title of thesis: The influence of the anterior pituitary on wool growth.

== Career ==
=== Commonwealth Scientific and Industrial Research Organisation ===
Purification and study of pituitary hormones with Alan Wallace.

Extended collaboration with Professor Leslie Lazarus and Dr Margaret Stuart of the Garvan Institute of Medical Research.

Novel method to protect food protein from breakdown in the rumen with Dr Trevor Scott

Polyunsaturated milk, cheese and meat products

==== Patents ====
- Method and food composition for feeding ruminants 1967
- Amino acid supplements 1976

=== Scientific administration ===
- 1968: officer-in-charge of the CSIRO Division of Animal physiology at Prospect, NSW
- 1973: chairman of the Animal Research Laboratories
- 1978 until retirement in 1986: director of the CSIRO Institute of Animal and Food Sciences. Ferguson was also one of the founders of the Endocrine Society of Australia, and was its president from 1972 to 1974.

Endocrine society of Australia foundation member (1958) and President 1962-74.

== Retirement ==
Work with Dr Jim Watts, originator of soft rolling skin merino selection process .

== Scientific archive ==
Unusually, his experimental scientific career is well documented. The extensive records and effects have been bequeathed to the National Library of Australia. The NLA index entry is .

== Honors ==
- Australian Centenary Medal, 2001
- Fellow, Australian Academy of Technological Sciences and Engineering
- Fellow, Australian College of Veterinary Scientists
