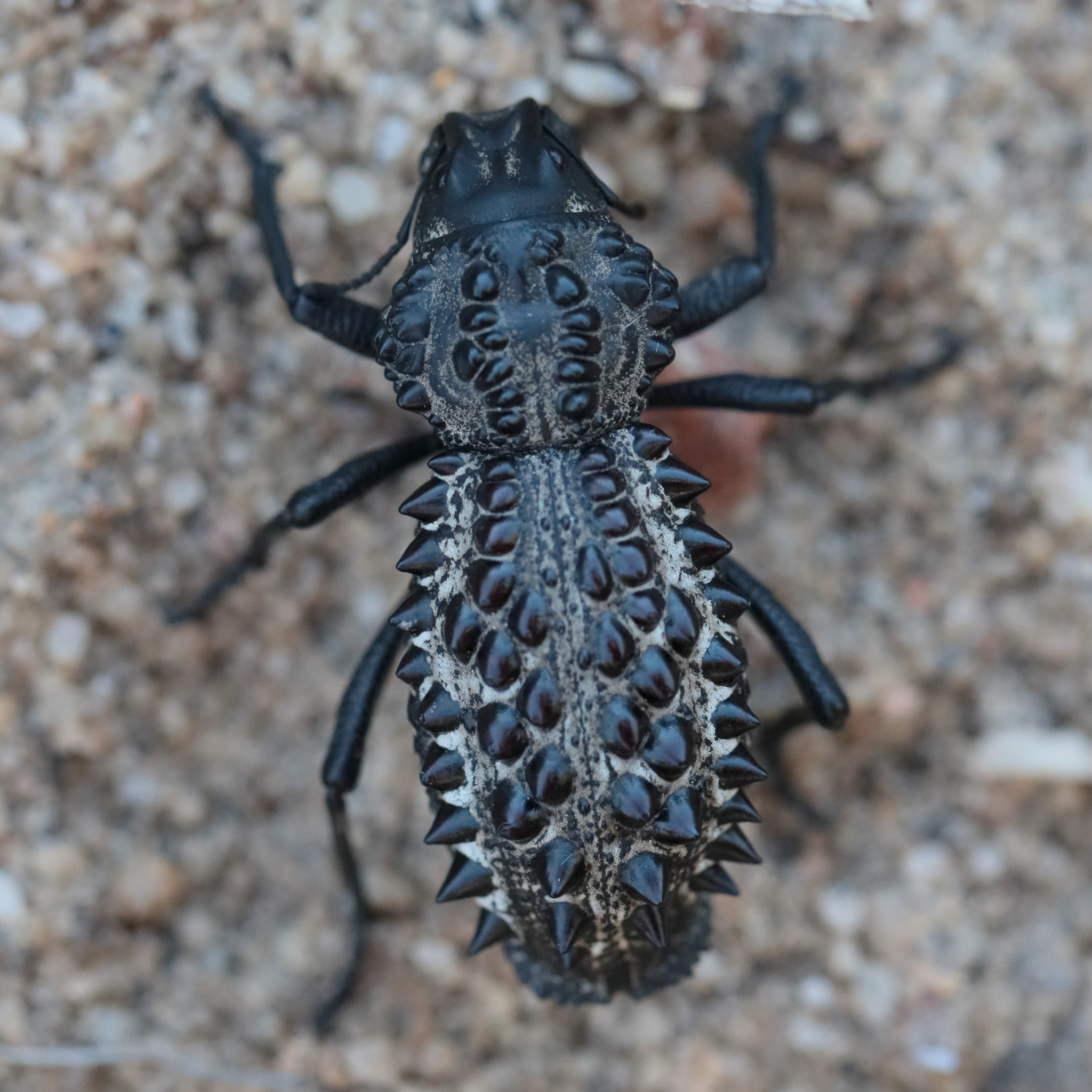
- Gagatophorus tibialis

Scientific classification
- Domain: Eukaryota
- Kingdom: Animalia
- Phylum: Arthropoda
- Class: Insecta
- Order: Coleoptera
- Suborder: Polyphaga
- Infraorder: Cucujiformia
- Family: Curculionidae
- Tribe: Amycterini
- Genus: Gagatophorus; Jekel, 1865

Type species
- Gagatophorus boisduvalii (Boisduval, 1835)

Synonyms
- Amycterus Lacordaire, 1863; Gagatonotus Jekel, 1865; Macramycterus Ferguson, 1914; Pseudamycterus Pierce, 1919

= Gagatophorus =

Genus of weevils

Gagatophorus is a genus of weevils belonging to the family Curculionidae, first described by Henri Jekel in 1865. The decisions for synonymy are based on work by Sigmund Schenkling and G.A.K. Marshall (Pseudamycterus), and Elwood Zimmerman (Gagatonotus and Macramycterus).

The species of this genus are found in Western Australia.

== Species ==
Species:

- Gagatophorus boisduvalii (Boisduval, 1835)
- Gagatophorus draco (W.S. Macleay, 1826)
- Gagatophorus leichhardti (Macleay, 1865)
- Gagatophorus obsoletus (Ferguson, 1914)
- Gagatophorus schoenherri (Hope, 1835)
- Gagatophorus tibialis (Ferguson, 1914)
