= Quinarian system =

Classification system of organisms

The quinarian system was a method of zoological classification which was popular in the mid 19th century, especially among British naturalists. It was largely developed by the entomologist William Sharp Macleay in 1819. The system was further promoted in the works of Nicholas Aylward Vigors, William Swainson and Johann Jakob Kaup. Swainson's work on ornithology gave wide publicity to the idea. The system had opponents even before the publication of Charles Darwin's On the Origin of Species (1859), which paved the way for evolutionary trees.

== Classification approach ==
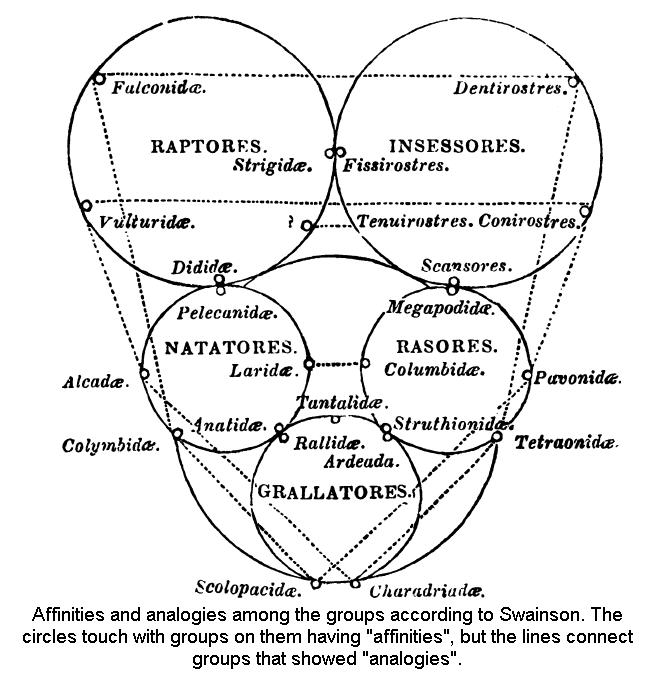
Swainson's Quinarian structure of birds

Quinarianism gets its name from the emphasis on the number five: it proposed that all taxa are divisible into five subgroups, and if fewer than five subgroups were known, quinarians believed that a missing subgroup remained to be found.

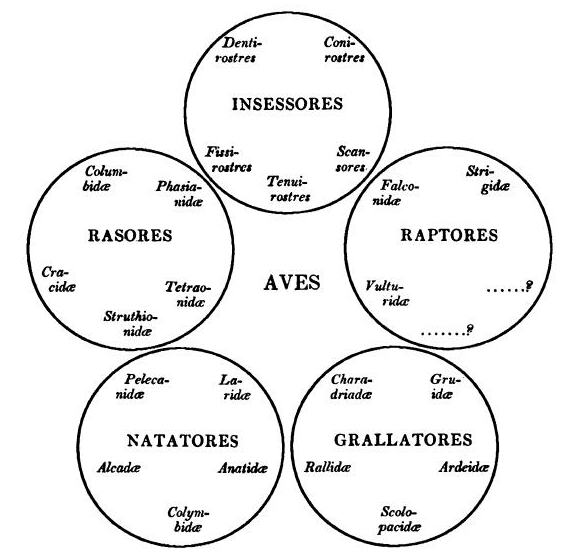
Nicholas Aylward Vigors's Quinarian classification of birds. The missing entries represented groups that he expected remained to be discovered.

Presumably this arose as a chance observation of some accidental analogies between different groups, but it was erected into a guiding principle by the quinarians. It became increasingly elaborate, proposing that each group of five classes could be arranged in a circle, with those closer together having greater affinities. Typically they were depicted with relatively advanced groups at the top, and supposedly degenerate forms towards the bottom. Each circle could touch or overlap with adjacent circles; the equivalent overlapping of actual groups in nature was called osculation.

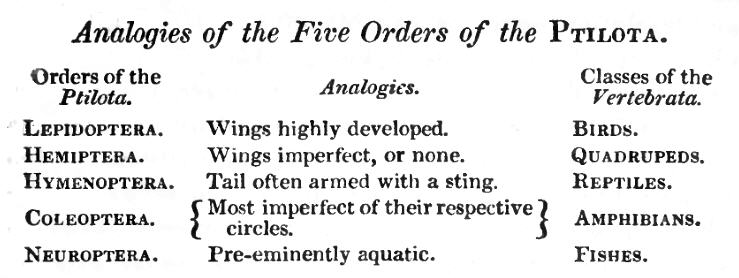
William Swainson's arrangement of the insects, with analogies to the vertebrates

Another aspect of the system was the identification of analogies across groups:

[W]e shall consider that to be a natural system which endeavours to explain the multifarious relations which one object bears to another, not simply in their direct affinity, by which they follow each other like the links of a vast chain, but in their more remote relations [analogies], whereby they typify or represent other objects totally distinct in structure and organization from themselves

— Swainson, 1835:197

Quinarianism was not widely popular outside the United Kingdom (some followers like William Hincks persisted in Canada); it became unfashionable by the 1840s, during which time more complex "maps" were made by Hugh Edwin Strickland and Alfred Russel Wallace. Strickland and others specifically rejected the use of relations of "analogy" in constructing natural classifications. These systems were eventually discarded in favour of principles of genuinely natural classification, namely based on evolutionary relationship.
