= Eustace William Ferguson =

New Zealand pathologist and entomologist

Eustace William Ferguson born 24 October 1884 (Invercargill, New Zealand,) died 18 July 1927 (Wahroonga, New South Wales) was a New Zealand pathologist and entomologist.

He was the third child of John Ferguson (clergyman) and Isabella Adie (1854-1929). His eldest brother was Sir John Alexander Ferguson (1881-1969), bibliographer and judge, who wrote the first bibliography of Australia.

He was a member from 1908 and president in 1926-27 of the Linnean Society of New South Wales, president of the Royal Zoological Society of New South Wales in 1922–23, a member of the Royal societies of New South Wales and South Australia and of the Royal Institute of Tropical Medicine, London, an associate member of the Australian National Research Council and a member of the Great Barrier Reef Committee. He and his wife, Jessie Perry (1886-1967) had six children, several of whom were notable:

- Eustace William Ferguson, General practitioner and surgeon based in Newcastle, NSW.
- David Alexander Ferguson, Medical Practitioner, Professor of Occupational Health, University of Sydney. RACP College role obituary
- Kenneth Adie Ferguson, CSIRO Researcher, Former Director of CSIRO Institute of Animal Health, Discover of the Ferguson plot method for assessing the electrophoretic mobility of solutes.
- Edward Stephen Perry Ferguson, Medical Practitioner based in Toowoombah, Queensland.
- Wilga Jessie Ferguson, Medical Practitioner
- Hugh Bishop Ferguson

== Publications ==
- Revision of Australian Syrphidae (Flower flies)
- Bioversity Heritage Library listing for E.W. Ferguson

== See also ==
- Amycterini
