= Macleay Museum =

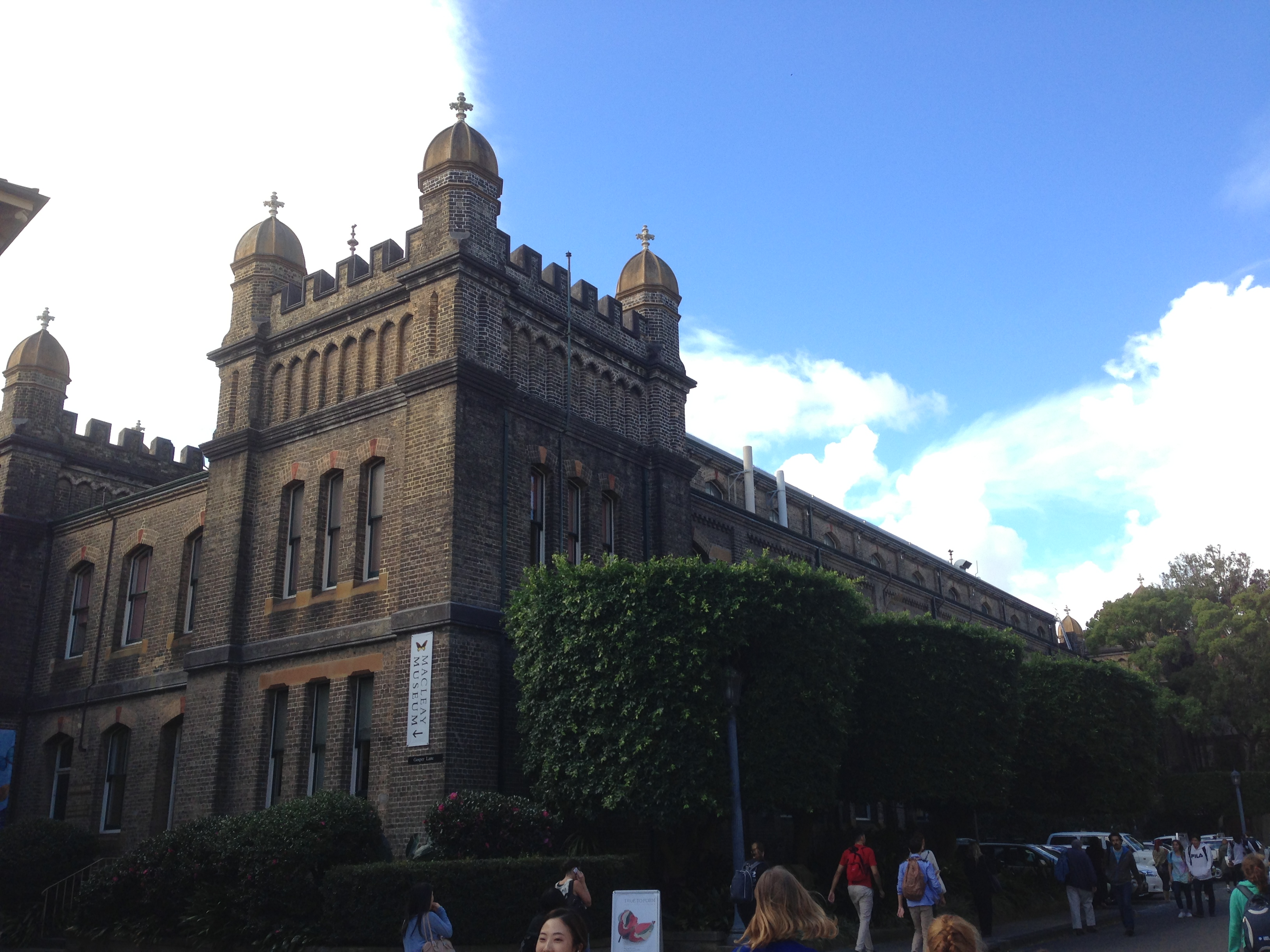
- Macleay Building, University of Sydney, 2013
- Former name: Museum of Antiquities
- Established: 1887
- Dissolved: 22 November 2016
- Location: Science Road, The University of Sydney, Camperdown, New South Wales, Australia
- Coordinates: 33°53′07″S 151°11′17″E
- Type: Natural history museum
- Collections: Colonial/Australian entomology; Colonial/Australian ethnography; Scientific instruments and apparatus; Colonial/Australian historic photographs
- Collection size: 79,000+
- Founders: Alexander Macleay; William Sharp Macleay; William John Macleay
- Director, University Museums: David Ellis (since 2013)
- Curators: Jan Brazier (History); Rebecca Conway (Ethnography); Anthony Gill (Natural History)
- Architect: George Allen Mansfield
- Owner: The University of Sydney
- Website: sydney.edu.au/museums/collections/macleay.shtml

New South Wales Heritage Database (Local Government Register)
- Official name: Macleay Museum; Macleay Museum Building, University of Sydney Including Interior
- Type: Local government heritage (built)
- Criteria: a., c., d., e., f.
- Designated: 14 December 2012
- Reference no.: I79
- Type: Education
- Category: University

The Macleay Museum at The University of Sydney, was a natural history museum located on the University's Camperdown campus, in Sydney, New South Wales, Australia. The museum was dissolved in 2016 and upon opening of the Chau Chak Wing Museum in 2020, its collections were amalgamated into it.

The Macleay Museum was added to the City of Sydney local government heritage list on 14 December 2012.

== History ==
The Macleay Building in which the museum was housed was built off Science Lane within the Camperdown campus in 1887. The collections were based largely on the efforts and acquisitions of the Macleay family, one of the pre-eminent families in colonial Sydney including Alexander Macleay, William Sharp Macleay and William John Macleay. The zoologist and collector George Masters served as curator until 1912.

== Collection ==
The strengths of the collection, now part of the Chau Chak Wing Museum, were in entomology, ethnography, scientific instruments, and historic photographs. Many of the biological specimens in the collection represented rare or extinct species, while some of the specimens have historic and cultural value as they were collected by explorers like Charles Darwin and Nicholas Miklouho-Maclay.

The George Masters Exhibition Space of the museum was devoted to temporary exhibitions. Overall, the museum housed one of the most important natural history and ethnography collections in Australia, surpassed in Sydney only by the Australian Museum.

== Gallery ==
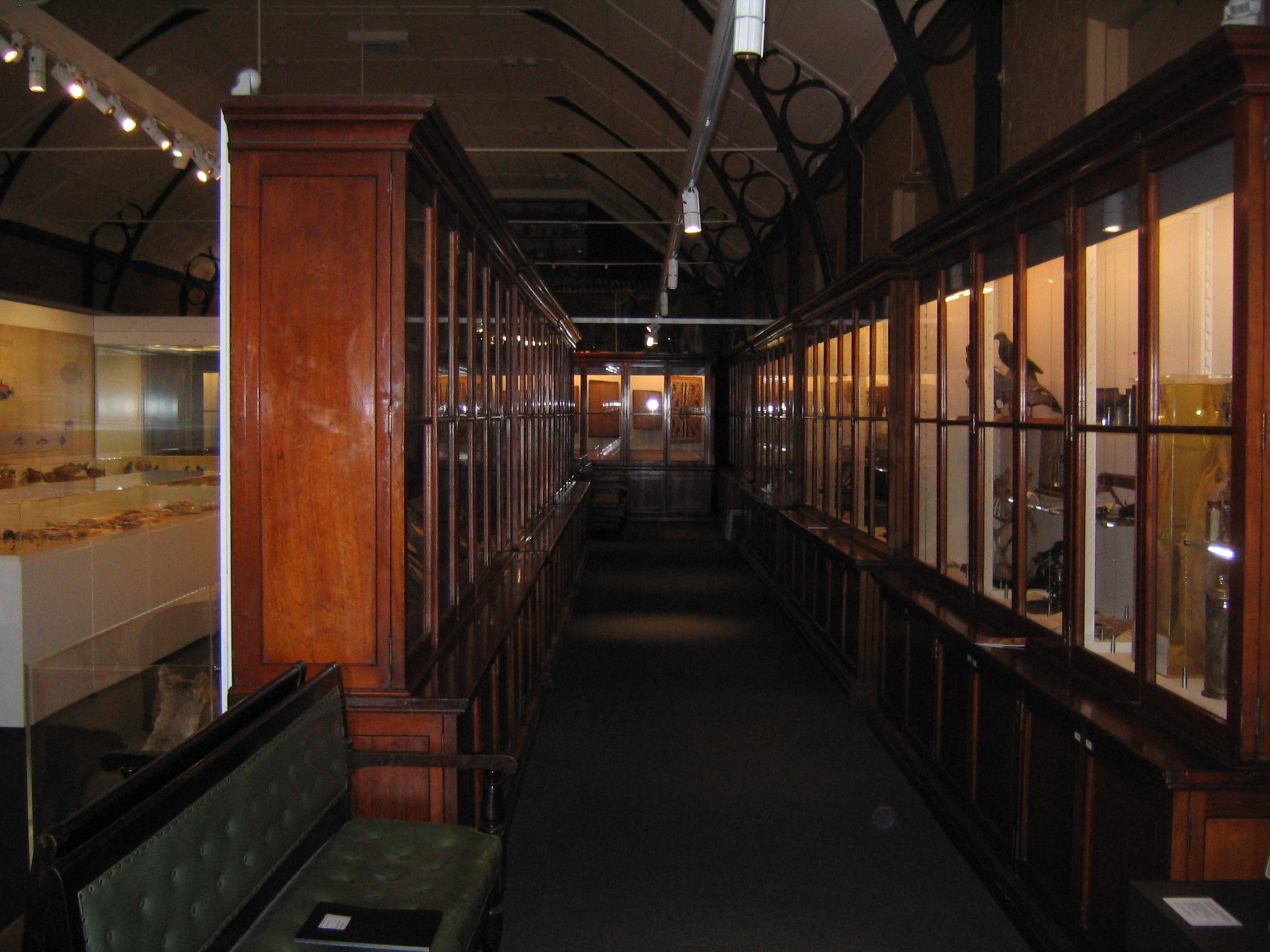
Inside the Macleay Museum

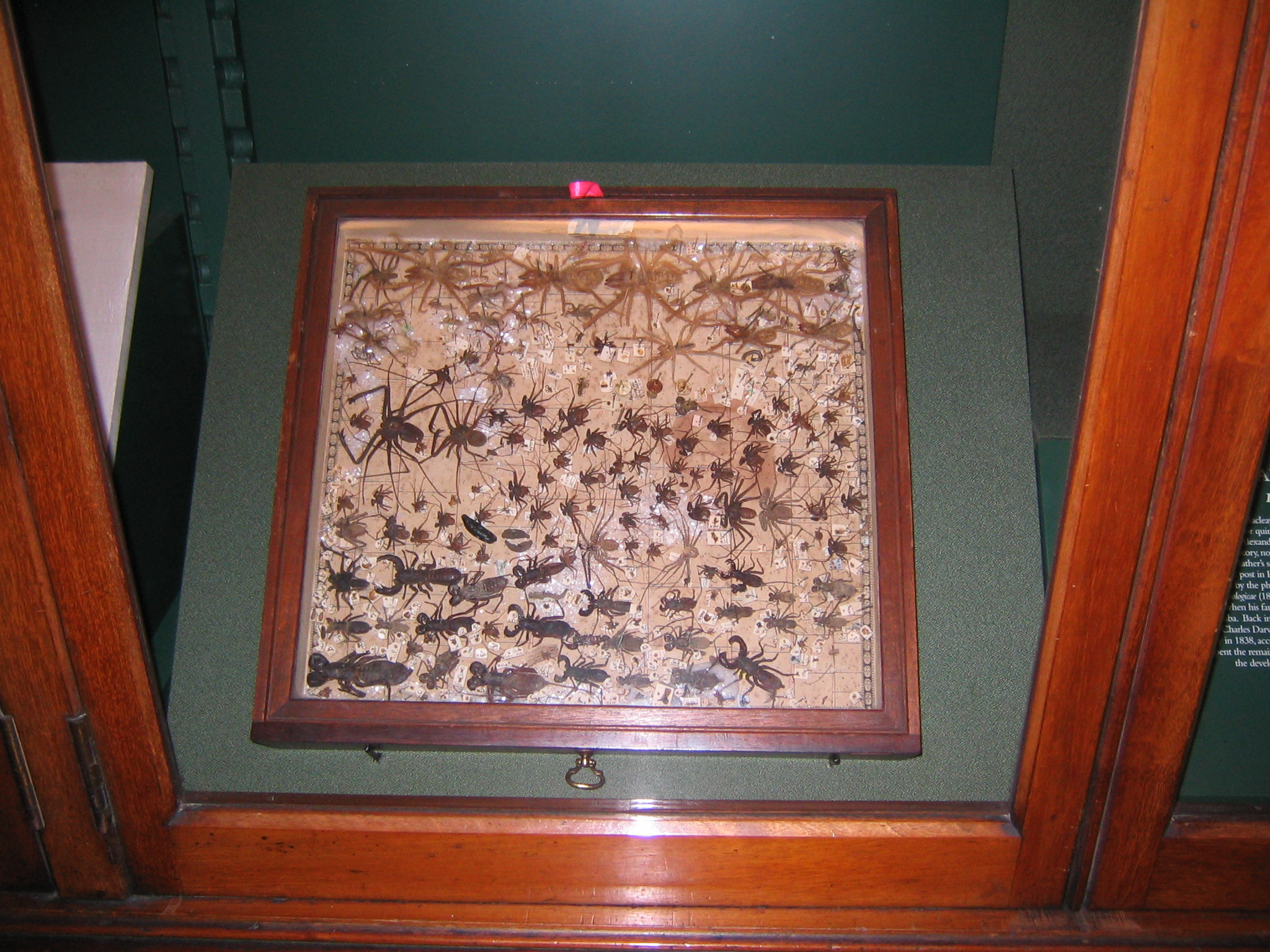

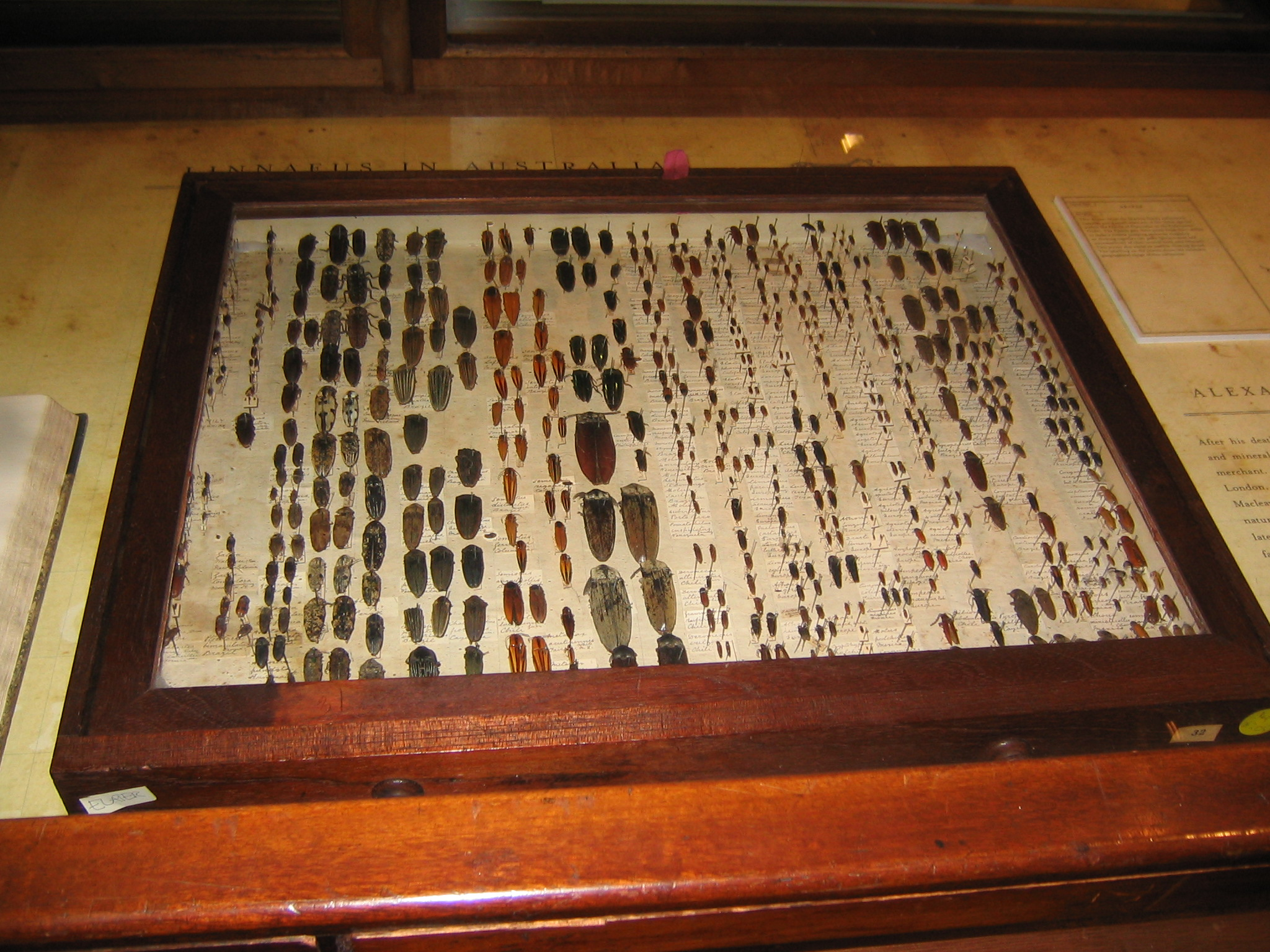

== See also ==
- List of museums in Sydney
- Nicholson Museum
