= William Sharp Macleay =

British civil servant and entomologist

William Sharp Macleay FLS
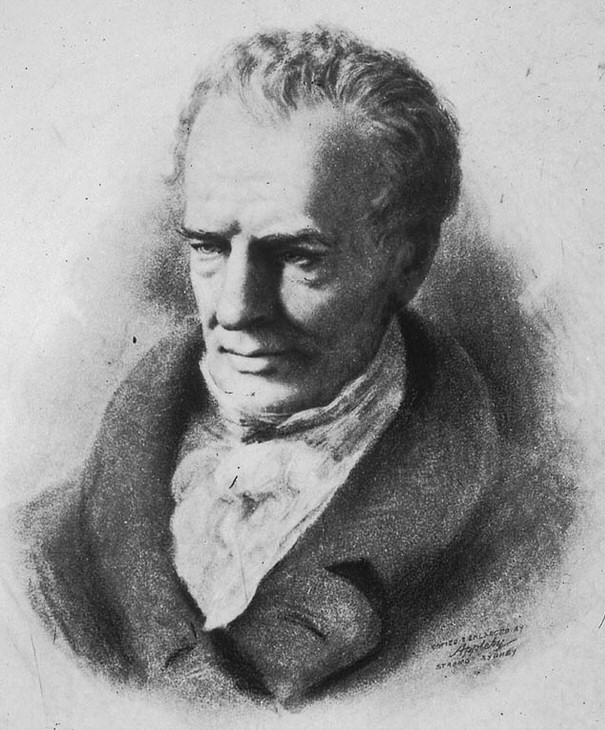
- Mitchell Library, NSW, before 1865
- Born: 21 July 1792; London
- Died: 26 January 1865 (aged 72); Sydney, Australia
- Occupation: civil servant
- Known for: entomologist

William Sharp Macleay or McLeay FLS (21 July 1792 – 26 January 1865) was a British civil servant and entomologist. He was also a prominent promoter of the Quinarian system of classification.

After graduating, he worked for the British embassy in Paris, following his interest in natural history and at the same time, publishing essays on insects and corresponding with Charles Darwin.

Macleay moved to Havana, Cuba, where he was, in turn: commissioner of arbitration, commissary judge, and then judge. Retiring from this work, he emigrated to Australia, where he continued to collect insects and studied marine natural history.

== Early life ==
Macleay was born in London, eldest son of Alexander Macleay, who named him for his then business partner and fellow wine merchant (William Sharp).

== Early scientific career ==
Macleay's principal work was Horae Entomologicae; or, Essays on the Annulose Animals, parts 1-2 (1819–1821). The first part of Horae Entomologicae included a re-examination of Linnaeus' genus Scarabaeus (12th edition of Systema Naturae, 1767) within the taxonomic context of Pierre Andre Latreille's "Lamellicornes" becoming the first monographer of what today is the family Scarabaeidae. He also published Annulosa Javanica or an Attempt to illustrate the Natural Affinities and Analogies of the Insects collected in Java by T. Horsfield, no. 1 (London, 1825).

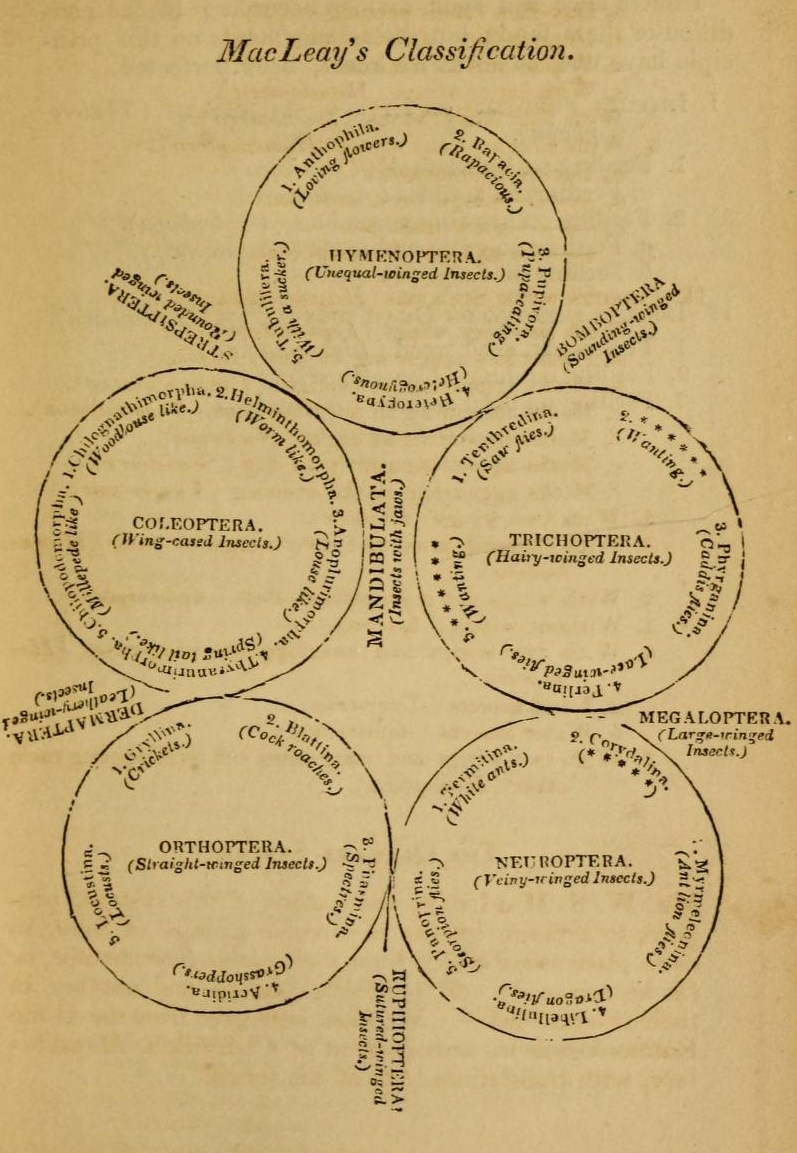
Classification of insects under the Quinarian system by Macleay, schematic diagram from an 1845 book by James Rennie.

Other minor publications on insects include Remarks on the devastation occasioned by Hylobius abietis in fir plantations in the Zoological Journal and several notes in the Transactions of the Entomological Society of London. Macleay sent many insects to Frederick William Hope, which are now preserved in the Hope Department of Entomology at Oxford University. He was also a correspondent of Charles Darwin, though he disagreed fervently with the latter's theories of evolution.

Macleay was the originator of the short-lived Quinarian system of classification, which is used extensively in his Horae Entomologicae. This was an attempt to classify animals into related groups and was put forward in Part 2 of his book Horae Entomologicae (1821). According to his reasoning, each major group of animals could be subdivided into 5 subgroups, and each sub-group could be further divided into 5. MacLeay was one of the first systematists to note the difference between similarity due to true relation, called affinity, and similarity due to function, called analogy. Major groups united by affinities could also be related to other groups or subgroups by overlaps known as osculations, based on analogy. As precursors of the concepts of homology and homoplasy, these proposals were taken very seriously at the time, and Charles Darwin, who got to know Macleay after he returned from the Beagle voyage, tried to fit Quinarian ideas into his evolutionary schemes up to about 1845 (see "The Development of Darwin's Theory" by Dov Ospovat, 1981). The ideas were also taken up by William Swainson, Nicholas Aylward Vigors, and others.

== Havana ==
In 1825, Macleay was appointed British commissioner of arbitration to the joint British and Spanish Court of Commission in Havana, Cuba, for the abolition of the slave trade; he became commissary judge in 1830, and then was appointed judge to the Mixed Tribunal of Justice in 1833. He retired in 1836 (at the age of 44) on a pension of £900. Throughout these years, he also maintained a correspondence with his sister Frances (Fanny) Leonora Macleay (1793–1836). These letters typically convey a harsh, even severe impression of his character.

Macleay had maintained his scientific work whilst in Havana and was elected to the Linnean Society, of which his father had been Secretary (1798–1825), and the Zoological Society. He was elected president of the natural history section of the British Association for the Advancement of Science.

== Australia ==
Macleay emigrated to Australia in 1839, living briefly at the Colonial Secretary's House in Macquarie Place with his parents before moving in September of that year to the family's still unfinished Elizabeth Bay House. He took possession of the estate in 1845, having taken on his father Alexander's considerable debts and the mortgages on the property (he formally inherited it in 1848). In an attempt to raise funds, he also sold furniture he had acquired in London on behalf of his father, but for which he had never been reimbursed. He did not, however, complete the house, and it remained without its planned colonnade. The house became a meeting place for a small circle of intellectuals and naturalists, though Macleay was not known for being actively sociable. Thomas Mitchell Jnr satirised the house and owner: 'Bleak House blears blindly o'er Eliza's Bay, chill as its owner's hospitality' (Carlin, p. 45). Macleay was interested in the natural history of Australia, the marine fauna around Port Jackson in particular. Later, he collected a large number of Australian insects; on his death, these were bequeathed to his cousin William John Macleay, whose interest in natural history he encouraged and who in 1888 transferred them to the Macleay Museum, University of Sydney, for which act he was knighted. He also encouraged the scientific interests of his brother George Macleay.

Macleay lived alone at Elizabeth Bay House until his death on 26 January 1865.

== Bibliography ==
- Boulger, George Simonds (1893). "Macleay, William Sharp" . In Lee, Sidney (ed.). Dictionary of National Biography. Vol. 35. London: Smith, Elder & Co.
- Carlin, Scott. (2000) Elizabeth Bay House: A History and a Guide. Sydney, Historic Houses Trust.
- David S. Macmillan, 'Macleay, William Sharp (1792 - 1865)', Australian Dictionary of Biography, Volume 2, MUP, 1967, pp. 182–183
- Macinnis, Peter (December 2012). "Bagging the bunyip : William Sharp Macleay, a true-blue naturalist". The National Library Magazine. 4 (4): 24–26. Archived from the original on 26 May 2015.
- Serle, Percival (1949). "Macleay, William Sharp". Dictionary of Australian Biography. Sydney: Angus & Robertson.
- A.Y. Swainston (1985). William Sharp Macleay, Linnean, 1 (5) : 11–18.

Additional resources listed by the Australian Dictionary of Biography:

- P. P. King, Narrative of a Survey of the Intertropical and Western Coasts of Australia, vols 1–2 (Lond, 1827)
- Linnean Society of New South Wales, Macleay Memorial Volume, ed J. J. Fletcher (Syd, 1893)
- Calcutta Journal of Natural History, July 1841
- Annals of Natural History, 8 (1841), 9 (1842)
- Tasmanian Journal of Natural Science, 3 (1849)
- Macleay papers (University of Sydney Archives)
