= 1778 in music =

== Events ==
- January 1 – Première of William Boyce's "When rival nations great in arms", at St James's Palace, London.
- January 14 – Wolfgang Amadeus Mozart, while visiting Mannheim, meets local composer Georg Joseph Vogler.
- January 27 – Niccolò Piccinni's first French opera, Roland, is premièred at the Paris Opera.
- February 14 – Wolfgang Amadeus Mozart writes to his father, Leopold Mozart, telling him how much he hates composing for the flute.
- February 17 – Ignaz Umlauf’s Die Bergknappen becomes the first singspiel by a local composer to be performed in Vienna.
- March 1 – Christoph Willibald Gluck returns to Vienna after a residence of ten years in Paris.
- March 2 – The Nationaltheater of Vienna's opera buffa company gives its final performance.
- March 15 – Thomas Arne is buried at St Paul's, Covent Garden, London.
- March 20 – Jiří Antonín Benda leaves his post as Kapellmeister at the court of Ernest II, Duke of Saxe-Coburg and Gotha.
- March 26 – Seven-year-old Ludwig van Beethoven gives his first concert performance, at Cologne.
- April 8 – Antonio Salieri leaves Vienna after a twelve-year absence from his native Italy.
- May 1 – Anna Maria Mozart complains of various ailments in a letter from Paris, where she is accompanying her son Wolfgang. She dies here on July 3.
- June 4 – King George III of the United Kingdom celebrates his 40th birthday; "Arm’d with her native force", an ode composed by William Boyce for the occasion, is performed for the first time.
- July 9 – Mozart writes to his father complaining about the French language and the poor standard of singing.
- July 13 – Leopold Mozart learns of his wife's death from a family friend, Abbé Joseph Bullinger.
- July 24 – The première of Giovanni Paisiello’s Lo sposo burlato takes place at the Russian court.
- August 1 – First publication (in London) of the song "To Anacreon in Heaven" with words by Ralph Tomlinson (d. March 17). Date of writing and first publication of the music by John Stafford Smith which becomes "The Star-Spangled Banner" is uncertain but probably about this time.
- August 3 – Teatro alla Scala, Milan, opens with a performance of Antonio Salieri's latest opera, Europa riconosciuta.
- August 27 – Mozart meets Johann Christian Bach in Paris.
- October 14 – Wolfgang Amadeus Mozart arrives in Strasbourg, where he will give three concerts.

== Classical music ==
- Carl Philipp Emanuel Bach
  - Harpsichord Concerto in G major, H.477
  - Harpsichord Concerto in D major, H.478
  - Sechs Clavier-Sonaten für Kenner und Liebhaber
- Johann Christian Bach – 4 Sonatas and 2 Duetts, Op. 15
- Jean-Frédéric Edelmann – 3 Sonates, Op. 6, for harpsichord
- Felice Giardini
  - 6 String Trios, Op. 20
  - 6 Quartets, Op. 21
- François Joseph Gossec – Symphonie concertante in F major No. 2, "à plusieurs instruments"
- Joseph Haydn
  - Little Organ Mass
  - Symphony No. 54
  - Il maestro e lo scolare, Hob.XVIIa:1
- František Kocžwara – The Battle of Prague, Op. 23
- Wolfgang Amadeus Mozart
  - Oboe Concerto in F major, K.293/416f
  - Duet Sonata for violin and piano K.296
  - Concerto for flute and harp in C major, K. 299
  - Violin Sonatas No. 18-23, K. 301-306
  - Ah se in ciel, K.538
  - Symphony No. 31 in D "Paris"
  - Piano Sonata No.8 in A Minor, K. 310/300d
- Joseph Bologne Saint-Georges – 2 Symphonies concertantes, Op. 13
- Antonio Salieri – Sinfonia Veneziana
- Johann Abraham Peter Schulz – Keyboard Sonata in E-flat major, Op. 2
- Hans Hinrich Zielche – 6 Flute Sonatas

== Opera ==
- Carl Christian Agthe – Martin Velten
- Johann Christian Bach – La Clemenza di Scipione
- Anton Bachschmidt – Antigono
- Pierre Joseph Candeille – Les Deux comtesses
- Christian Cannabich – Azakia
- Domenico Cimarosa
  - Il ritorno di Don Calandrino
  - Le stravaganze d'amore
- Charles Dibdin – The Shepherdess of the Alps
- André Grétry – Le jugement de Midas
- Niccolò Piccinni – Roland
- Antonio Sacchini – Erifile
- Antonio Salieri
  - Europa riconosciuta
  - La scuola de' gelosi

== Published popular music ==
- The Singing Master's Assistant – William Billings, including "Africa"

== Methods and theory writings ==
- William Billings – The Singing Master's Assistant
- Johann Nikolaus Forkel – Musikalisch-kritische Bibliothek
- Mussard – Nouveaux principes pour apprendre a jouer de la Flutte Traversiere
- Ignacio Ramoneda – Arte de canto-llano

== Births ==
- January 5 – Fortunato Santini, composer
- January 9 – Dede Efendi, composer
- January 13 – Anton Fischer, composer
- February 12 – Franz Joseph Volkert, composer
- February 14 – Fernando Sor, guitarist and composer
- February 17 – Vincenzo Pucitta, Italian composer (d. 1861)
- March 8 – Friedrich August Kanne, composer and music critic(d. 1833)
- April 6 – Joseph Funk, composer and music teacher (d. 1862)
- May 8 – Johann Gansbacher, composer (d. 1844)
- May 28 – Friedrich Westenholz, composer
- July 10 – Sigismund Ritter von Neukomm, Austrian composer and royal kapellmeister (d. 1858)
- July 29 – Carl Borromaus Neuner
- September 3 – Jean Nicolas Auguste Kreutzer, composer
- November 14 – Johann Nepomuk Hummel, composer

== Deaths ==
- February 15 – Johann Gottlieb Görner, organist and composer (b. 1697)
- March 5 – Thomas Arne, composer, best known for "Rule Britannia" (b. 1710)
- May 8 – Lorenz Christoph Mizler, physician and music writer (b. 1711)
- June 11 – Andrew Tait, Scottish organist, composer, church musician, and music educator (b. c. 1710)
- July 2 – Jean-Jacques Rousseau, philosopher, writer and composer (b. 1712)
- July 3 – Anna Maria Mozart, mother of Wolfgang Amadeus Mozart (b. 1720; typhoid)
- August 5 – Thomas Linley the younger, composer, aged 22
- August 14 – Augustus Montague Toplady, hymn-writer (b. 1740)
- August 24 – Johannes Ringk, organist, composer and copyist of Bach (b. 1717)
- September 20 – Quirino Gasparini, composer (b. 1721)
- October 30 – Davide Perez, opera composer (b. 1711)
- November 11 – Anne Steele, hymn-writer (b. 1717)
- December – Samuel Linley, oboist and singer (b. 1760)
- December 12 – Hermann Raupach, composer (b. 1728)
- date unknown
  - Americus Backers, piano maker
  - Giovanni Battista Costanzi, Italian composer (born 1704)
  - Célestin Harst, organist and harpsichordist (b. 1698)
