= List of Aberdonians =

Of the many notable Aberdonians from Aberdeen and Aberdeenshire in Scotland, The Open winning golfer Paul Lawrie and the musician Annie Lennox are the most famous in modern times. However, Aberdeen has produced many earlier important people, such as Thomas Blake Glover, an assisting figure in the foundation of Mitsubishi.

== Architecture and design ==
- Ninian Comper (1864–1960), architect
- Bill Gibb (1943–1988), fashion designer
- James Gibbs (1682–1754), architect
- Archibald Simpson (1790–1847), architect, responsible for many Aberdeen buildings
- W. Douglas Simpson (1896–1968), architectural scholar and archaeologist
- John Smith (1781–1852), architect

== Armed forces ==
- David Baird (1757–1829), soldier
- James Brooke (1884–1914), recipient of the Victoria Cross
- Robert Grierson Combe (1880–1917), recipient of the Victoria Cross
- John Cruickshank (1920–2025), recipient of the Victoria Cross
- Marion Patterson (1911–1993), recipient of the George Medal
- John Rennie (1920–1943), acting sergeant, recipient of a posthumous George Cross for gallantry while on training
- Archibald Bisset Smith (1878–1917), recipient of the Victoria Cross

== Art and sculpture ==
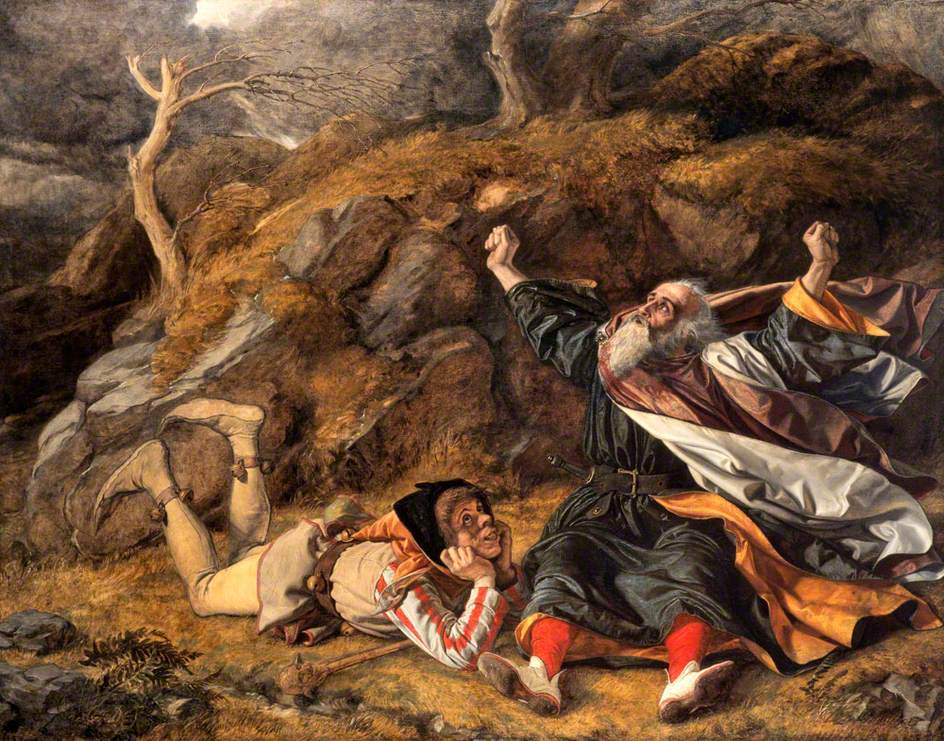
King Lear and the Fool in the Storm, by artist William Dyce

- John Macdonald Aiken (1880–1961), painter and stained-glass artist
- Johanna Basford (born 1983), illustrator and textile designer
- Alexander Milne Calder (1846–1923), sculptor
- Berthe des Clayes (1877–1968), artist
- Gertrude des Clayes (1879–1949), portrait painter
- William Dyce (1806–1864), artist
- George Jamesone (c. 1587–1644), Scotland's first eminent artist
- William Keith (1838–1911), landscape artist
- Jennifer Lee (born 1956), Scottish ceramic artist
- Shona Macdonald, artist, University of Massachusetts Amherst professor
- Esther Blaikie MacKinnon (1885–1934), artist
- James McBey (1883–1959), artist
- John Menzies (painter) (1871-1939), landscape and portrait painter
- Alberto Morrocco (1917–1998), artist and teacher
- Stephen Reid (1873–1948), illustrator and painter

== Business ==
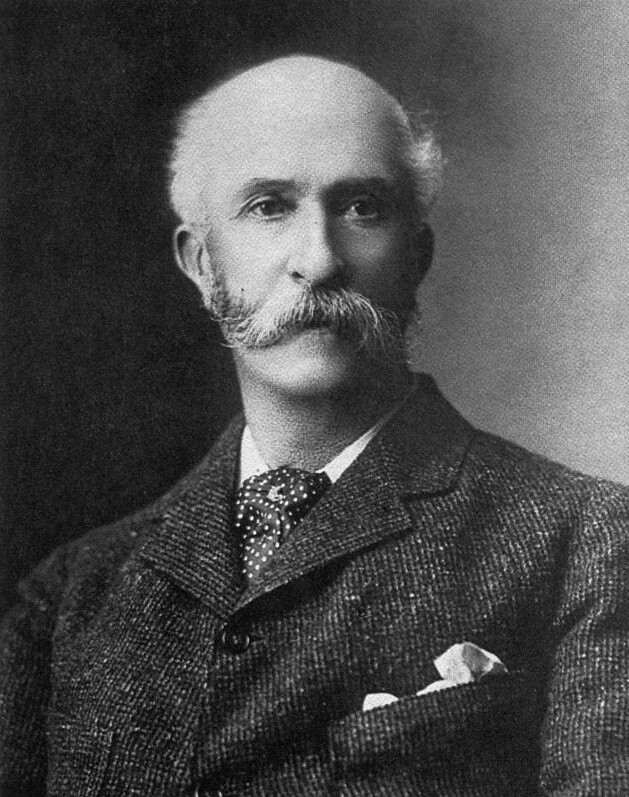
Thomas Blake Glover, merchant in 19th century Japan

- William Black (1771–1866), Canadian shipper and merchant
- Alexander Blackwell (c. 1700–1747), adventurer
- Thomas Blake Glover (1838–1911), trader in Bakumatsu and Meiji era Japan
- Robert Gordon (1668–1731), philanthropist and merchant
- Stewart Milne (born 1950), businessman and former Aberdeen F.C. chairman
- George Smith (1806–1899), financier
- Ian Wood, businessman
- Sir Thomas Sutherland (1834-1922), banker and politician

== Literature and journalism ==
- Lord Byron (1788–1824), poet (raised in Aberdeen aged 2–10)
- Alexander Chalmers (1759–1834), writer and editor
- Simon Farquhar (born 1972), writer
- Lewis Grassic Gibbon (1901–1935), author
- Richard Gordon (born 1960), BBC Radio Scotland presenter
- John Imlah (1799–1846), poet
- Angus Konstam (born 1960), writer and historian
- Iain Levison (born 1963), novelist and journalist
- Lachlan Mackinnon (born 1956), poet and critic
- David Masson (1822–1907), author
- Arthur Butler Phillips Mee (1860–1926), journalist, historian and astronomer
- Lorna Moon (1886–1930), author and screenwriter
- Janet Milne Rae (1844–1933), novelist and missionary, born in Willowbank
- Alexander Scott (1920–1989), poet in Braid Scots and English
- Nan Shepherd (1893–1981), author and poet
- Rachel Annand Taylor (1876–1960), poet and critic

== Music ==
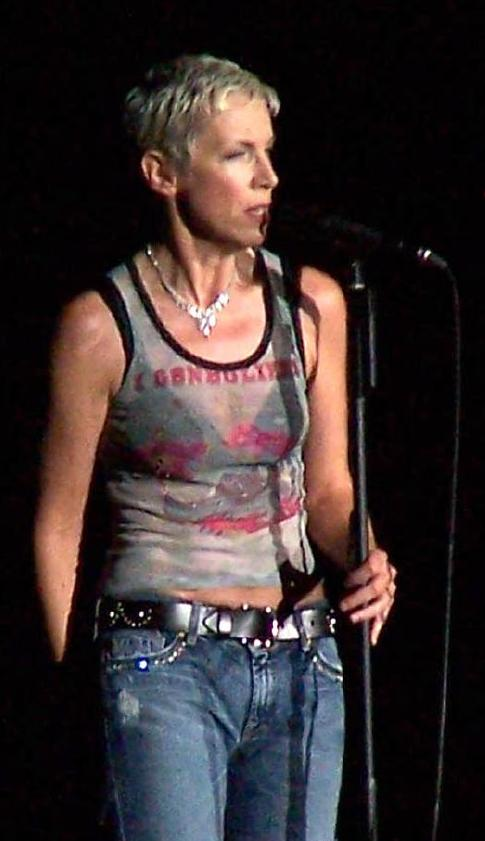
Singer Annie Lennox

- Connor Ball (born 1996), bassist of The Vamps
- Yvie Burnett (born 1963), opera singer, vocal coach and TV personality
- Ian Campbell (1933–2012), folk musician
- Ronald Center (1913–1973), composer
- Finlay Dun (1795–1853), musician and collector of Scottish songs
- Iona Fyfe (born 1998), award-winning Scots singer and musician
- Mary Garden (1874–1967), opera singer
- Evelyn Glennie (born 1965), virtuoso percussionist
- Calvin Goldspink (born 1989), singer and US-based actor
- Jimmy Hastings (born 1938), rock and jazz instrumentalist
- Hellripper (2014 – present), one-man black/speed metal band
- Annie Lennox (born 1954), singer
- Neil Mackie (born 1946), tenor and professor at Royal College of Music
- Alasdair MacLean (born 1974), vocalist and songwriter
- Terry McDermott, singer
- John McLeod (born 1934), composer
- Jimmy Murrison (born 1964), lead guitarist
- Pallas (1980 – present), progressive rock band
- Stanley Robertson (1940–2009), ballad singer and storyteller
- Seb Rochford, drummer
- The Shamen, electronic dance music band
- Andrew Tait (c. 1710–1778) a Scottish organist, composer, church musician, and music educator
- The Xcerts, band

== Politics ==
- Richard Alexander (1934–2008), former MP for Newark
- Sir John Anderson (1858–1915), Governor of Straits Settlements
- Sir John Arbuthnot, 1st Baronet (1912–1992), politician
- Norman Baker, MP for Lewes and former UK government minister
- Peter Bevan-Baker (1962–), Canadian politician, the current leader for the PEI Green Party (from 2012), MLA (from 2015), and official opposition leader for Prince Edward Island (from 2019)
- Kirsty Blackman, SNP MP for Aberdeen North (from 2015)
- William Mortimer Clark (1836–1917), Canadian politician
- James Cran, former MP for Beverley, PPS, Maastricht Rebel and Shadow Deputy Leader of the House
- Dan Crenshaw, U.S. politician
- Stuart Donaldson, SNP MP for West Aberdeenshire and Kincardine (from 2015)
- Christian Farquharson-Kennedy (1870–1917), Scottish teacher, socialist and suffragist
- James Moir Ferres (1813–1870), Upper Canadian politician and journalist
- Frank Findlay (1884–1945), New Zealand politician
- James Forrester (1937–2011), U.S. politician
- Sydney Gardner (1884–1965), Australian politician
- Michael Gove (born 1967), Conservative MP, Secretary of State for Levelling Up, Housing and Communities, and Minister for Intergovernmental Relations
- Rosemary Hall (1925–2011), Scottish Nationalist politician
- John Hope (1842–1926), Tasmanian politician
- Joseph Hunter (1839–1935), Canadian politician and surveyor
- William Alexander Hunter (1844–1898), politician and jurist
- James Hutchison (1859–1909), Australian politician
- Sir William MacGregor (1846–1919), Lieutenant-Governor of British New Guinea, Lieutenant-Governor of Newfoundland and Labrador and Governor of Queensland
- Callum McCaig, former MP for Aberdeen South (from 2015 to 2017)
- Donald Melville (1829–1919), Australian politician
- Alexander Mitchell (1817–1887), U.S. politician
- Robert Morrison, 1st Baron Morrison (1881–1953), British politician and parliamentary private secretary
- John Paton (1886–1976), politician and British MP
- Douglas Ross (born 1983), leader of the Scottish Conservatives
- William Bain Scarth (1837–1902), Canadian politician
- Sir Richard Shepherd, MP for Aldridge-Brownhills
- Graham Simpson (living), Conservative MSP
- Thomas Smith (1745–1809), U.S. politician
- Nicol Stephen, Baron Stephen (born 1960), Deputy First Minister of Scotland and Leader of Scottish Liberal Democrats
- John Stevenson, MP for Carlisle
- John Strachan, U.S. politician
- Ross Thomson (born 1987), politician and former MSP, former Conservative MP for Aberdeen South
- Eilidh Whiteford, SNP MP for Banff and Buchan (from 2010)

== Religion ==
- Oswald Chambers (1874–1917), seminarian
- Alexander Cruden (1699–1770), theologian
- Alexander Ewing (1814–1873), church leader
- Rev. John Ferguson (1852–1925), Presbyterian minister and Acting Principal of St Andrew's College at University of Sydney
- Alan Main (born 1936), minister and Moderator of the Church of Scotland
- Rev. Scott Rennie (born 1972), minister and theologian
- John Strachan (1778–1867), first Anglican Bishop of Toronto
- William Turner (1844–1914), Roman Catholic Bishop of Galloway (1893–1914)
- Alexander Young (died 1684), Bishop of Edinburgh, then of Ross

== Scholarship ==
- William Barclay (1546–1608), jurist
- John Hill Burton (1809–1881), Historiographer Royal
- Nora Griffith (1870–1937), Egyptologist and conservator
- Gilbert Jack (c. 1578–1628), Aristotelian philosopher and polymath
- Michael Lynch (born 1946), historian
- George Croom Robertson (1842–1892), philosopher
- Kathleen Stock (born 1972), philosopher

== Science and medicine ==
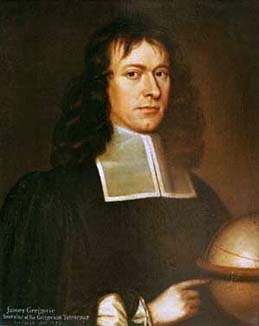
Astronomer James Gregory

- May Baird (1901-1983) doctor and social pioneer
- Terence Cawthorne (1902–1970), ear, nose and throat surgeon, knighted
- Sir Andrew Clark, 1st Baronet (1826–1893), physician and pathologist
- James Clerk Maxwell (1831-1879) physicist and mathematician, responsible for the classical theory of electromagnetic radiation
- Mary Esslemont (1891-1984) activist, general practitioner and gynecologist
- Quentin Gibson (1918–2011), physiologist and biochemist
- Sir David Gill (1843–1914), astronomer
- David Gregory (1659–1708), astronomer
- James Gregory (1638–1675), astronomer and mathematician
- James Charles Inglis (1851–1911), civil engineer, knighted
- Alexander Gordon (physician) (1752-1799) obstetrician best known for clearly demonstrating the contagious nature of puerperal sepsis
- Wilson Jameson (1885–1962), physician
- Hans Kosterlitz (1903-1999) biochemist
- J. Michael Kosterlitz (1942) physicist and Nobel prize winner
- Robert Daniel Lawrence (1892-1968) physician and founder of the British Diabetic Association (now Diabetes UK)
- Duncan Liddel (1561-1613) mathematician, physician and astronomer
- John Macleod (physiologist) (1876-1935) biochemist, physiologist, co-discoverer and isolation of insulin and Nobel prize winner
- John MacGillivray (1821–1867), naturalist
- William MacGillivray (1796–1852), naturalist and ornithologist
- John Alexander MacWilliam (1857-1937) physiologist
- John Mallard (1927-2021) physicist who lead the team that developed the first magnetic resonance imaging (MRI) full body scanner
- Francis Masson (1741–1805), botanist
- James McGrigor (1771-1858) physician, military surgeon and botanist
- Robert Morison (1620–1683), botanist and taxonomist
- Margaret Myles (1992-1988) pioneering midwife, midwifery tutor, lecturer and author
- Alexander Ogston (1844-1929) surgeon and discoverer of Staphylococcus
- John Boyd Orr (1880-1971) doctor, biologist, nutritional physiologist, politician, businessman and farmer who was awarded the Nobel Peace Prize
- Mary Pirie (1822–1855), botanist, entomologist and teacher
- Jennifer Garden (born 1987) chemist

== Sports ==
- Russell Anderson (born 1978), footballer
- Tim Baillie (born 1979), slalom canoeist and 2012 Olympic gold medal winner
- Ian Black, (born 1941), swimmer
- George Buchan (born 1950), footballer
- Martin Buchan (born 1949), footballer
- David Carry (born 1981), swimmer and 2006 Commonwealth gold medal winner
- Henry Cecil (1943-2013), racehorse trainer
- Louise Christie (born 2000), rhythmic gymnast and 2022 Commonwealth Games silver medal winner
- Neil Cochran (born 1965), swimmer and 1984 Olympic bronze medal winner
- Rachel Corsie (born 1989), footballer
- Peter Craigmyle (1894 – 1979), football referee
- Donald Colman (1878-1942), football player, coach and inventor of the dugout
- Warren Cummings (born 1980), footballer
- Chris Cusiter (born 1982), rugby union player
- Alex Dawson (born 1940), footballer
- Paul Dixon (born 1986), footballer
- Neil Fachie (born 1984), athlete and 2012 Paralympic gold medal winner
- James Angus Gillan (1885–1981), Olympic rower
- John Hewitt (born 1963), footballer and scorer of winning goal in 1983 European Cup Winners' Cup
- Stuart Holden (born 1985), footballer who plays for USA
- Denis Law (1940-2025), footballer
- Paul Lawrie (born 1969), golfer
- Graham Leggat (1934–2015), footballer and TV presenter
- Moray Low (born 1984), rugby union player
- Ken Malcolm (1926–2006), footballer
- Shaun Maloney (born 1983), footballer (raised in Aberdeen)
- Shona Marshall (born 1964), sport shooter
- Bobby McDonald (born 1955), footballer
- Hannah Miley (born 1989), swimmer and 2010 Commonwealth gold medal winner (raised in Aberdeen)
- Willie Moir (1922–1988), footballer
- Bill Murray (1901–1961), footballer
- John Murray (1873–1916), cricketer
- George Mutch (1912–2001), footballer and trainer
- David Ojabo (born 2000), American football linebacker (raised in Aberdeen)
- Gavin Rae (born 1977), footballer
- Richie Ramsay (born 1983), golfer
- John Rattray (born 1978), skateboarder
- Andy Reid, football player in the 1930s
- Robbie Renwick (born 1988), swimmer and 2010 Commonwealth gold medal winner (raised in Aberdeen)
- Barry Robson (born 1978), footballer
- Andrew Shinnie (born 1989), footballer
- Fred Smith (1926–2005), footballer
- Neil Simpson (born 1961), footballer (raised in Aberdeenshire)
- Jason White (born 1978), rugby union player (raised in Aberdeen)

== Stage and screen ==
- Jane Beadon (1913–1999), actress and socialite
- John Henry Anderson (1814–1874), magician
- William Devlin (1911–1987), stage, film and TV actor
- James Donald (1917–1993), actor
- Tunji Kasim (living), actor
- Rose Leslie (born 1987), actress
- Laurie Macmillan (1947–2001), broadcaster
- Laura Main, actress
- Scotland the What?, comedy revue act
- Michael Sheard (1938–2005), actor
- Jeff Stewart (born 1955), actor
- Annie Wallace, actress
- Amy Lennox, actress

== Others ==
- John Watt Beattie (1859–1930), Tasmanian photographer
- William Dove Paterson (1860–1916), entertainer, cinematographer
- Leslie Benzies, video game producer and President of Rockstar North, creators of the critically acclaimed Grand Theft Auto series
- Tom Dalgliesh (born 1945), games designer
- Juliet-Jane Horne (born 1984), model, Miss Scotland 2000
- George Washington Wilson (1823–1892), photographer
- Mary Helen Young, (1883–1945), nurse, French Resistance
