= A Land of Pure Delight =

A Land of Pure Delight: William Billings Anthems and Fuging Tunes

Studio album by His Majestie's Clerkes and Paul Hillier
- Released: 1992
- Recorded: 1991 at the Joseph Bond Chapel, University of Chicago, Chicago
- Genre: Hymns
- Length: 53'
- Label: Harmonia Mundi France 907048
- Producer: Engineer: Lawrence Rock

A Land of Pure Delight: William Billings Anthems and Fuging Tunes is a 1992 album of hymns, anthems and songs written by William Billings performed by the American vocal ensemble His Majestie's Clerkes conducted by Paul Hillier on Harmonia Mundi Records as a sequel to their earlier Ghoostly Psalms: Anglo-American Psalmody 1550–1800.

The album was favourably reviewed by the Chicago Tribune as sung with "impeccable musicianship, full-throated tone, warmth and security of blend and expressive intelligence", and listed in the Penguin Guide to Compact Discs. The Digital Audio Music List reviewed the audio quality of the album as "technically exceptional in every positive way".

== Track listing ==
1. O Praise the Lord of Heaven
2. Is Any Afflicted
3. Emmaus
4. Africa
5. Funeral Anthem: Samuel the Priest
6. Shiloh
7. Jordan
8. I Am the Rose of Sharon
9. Euroclydon
10. Hear My Pray'r
11. Rutland
12. David's Lamentation
13. As the Hart Panteth
14. Creation
15. Brookfield
16. Easter Anthem: The Lord Is Ris'n Indeed
