= Creation (William Billings) =

Hymn tune by William Billings

Creation is a hymn tune composed by William Billings.

== History ==
Billings included Creation in his final collection, The Continental Harmony (published in 1794). The words are by Isaac Watts: the first stanza is from Psalm 139 and the second from hymn 19, book 2, of his Hymns. In 2002, historian of science Edward B. Davis (co-editor of The Works of Robert Boyle) discovered that Watts based the second stanza on a meditation by the famous chemist Robert Boyle. In that text, from Occasional Reflections Upon Several Subjects (1665), Boyle reflected on an illness from which he had recovered, noting the great complexity of the human body and the wonder of how it all stays so well for so many years.

== Words ==
When I with pleasing wonder stand
And all my frame survey
Lord, 'tis thy work, I own thy hand
Thus built my humble clay

Our life contains a thousand springs,
And dies if one be gone.
Strange that a harp of thousand strings
Should keep in tune so long.

== See also ==
- Africa (William Billings), hymn tune with music score
- Chester (song), an American Revolutionary War anthem
