= Paul Hillier =

English conductor (born 1949)

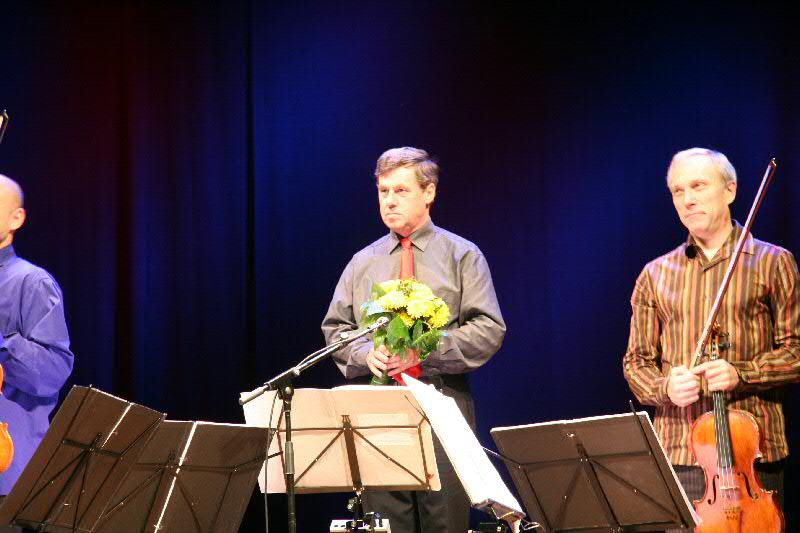
Members of the Kronos Quartet with Paul Hillier (middle) in Malmö, 2005

Paul Douglas Hillier OBE (born 9 February 1949) is an English conductor, music director and baritone. He specializes in both early and contemporary classical music, especially that by composers Steve Reich and Arvo Pärt. He was a co-founder of the Hilliard Ensemble and of Theatre of Voices, and directed the Estonian Philharmonic Chamber Choir for many years. He served as Chief Conductor of Ars Nova (Copenhagen) from 2003 to 2023, and has been the Artistic Director and Chief Conductor of Chamber Choir Ireland (formerly known as the National Chamber Choir of Ireland) since 2008.

He was made an Officer of the Order of the British Empire in 2006.

== Ensembles ==
Hillier was born in Dorchester, England, in 1949, where he attended The Thomas Hardye School. In 1967 he became a music student at the Guildhall School of Music & Drama, studying voice.

In 1974, he co-founded the Hilliard Ensemble along with fellow vicar-choral Paul Elliott, tenor, and countertenor David James. His concert debut was in 1974 in London's Purcell Room. Hillier remained the director of the ensemble until 1990, when he founded Theatre of Voices. In addition to early music, this group explores more contemporary repertoire. With the Chicago-based ensemble His Majestie's Clerkes Hillier recorded early American repertoire such as the works of William Billings on the 1992 album A Land of Pure Delight.

Hillier later became Director of the Early Music Institute at the Indiana University Jacobs School of Music where he conducted the Pro Arte Singers. He left the E.M.I. in 2003, having meanwhile become Artistic Director and Principal Conductor of the Estonian Philharmonic Chamber Choir; he left the position in 2007.

Since 2003, Hillier has lived in Copenhagen, where he is Chief Conductor of Theatre of Voices (1990-) and led Ars Nova (Copenhagen) 2003-2023. In 2008, he was appointed Artistic Director and Chief Conductor of Chamber Choir Ireland (then known as the National Chamber Choir of Ireland.) In February 2024, it was announced that this would be Hillier's sixteenth and final year as Artistic Director of Chamber Choir Ireland.

Hillier has recorded a number of solo albums, some with harpist Andrew Lawrence-King on the Harmonia Mundi, ECM, EMI, Finlandia and Hyperion labels.

== Academic appointments ==
From 1980, Hillier has held a variety of academic appointments, most recently as Director of the Early Music Institute at Indiana University Bloomington.

== Publications ==
- The Catch Book (1987), Oxford University Press, ISBN 0-19-343649-3, a collection of catches (comic rounds) edited by Hillier.
- A Josquin Anthology (2005), Oxford University Press, ISBN 0-19-353218-2, a collection of choral pieces by Renaissance composer Josquin des Prez, edited by Ross Duffin and Hillier.
- Writing on Music, 1965–2000 (2002), Oxford University Press, ISBN 0-19-511171-0, a collection of writings by composer Steve Reich, edited by Hillier.
- Arvo Pärt (1997), Oxford University Press, ISBN 0-19-816616-8, The first English-language study (including a short biography) of Estonian composer Arvo Pärt.
- English Romantic Partsongs (1986), Oxford University Press, ISBN 0-19-343650-7, a collection of songs edited by Hillier.
- 300 Years of English Partsongs: Glees, Rounds, Catches, Partsongs 1600-1900 (1983), Faber & Faber, ISBN 0-571-10045-7, a collection of music edited by Hillier.
