= Chester (song) =

1770 song by William Billings

"Chester" is a patriotic anthem composed by William Billings and sung during the American Revolutionary War. Billings wrote the first version of the song for his 1770 songbook The New England Psalm Singer, and made improvements for the version in his The Singing Master's Assistant (1778). It is the latter version that is best known today.

The name of the tune reflects a common practice of Billings' day, in which tunes were labeled with (often arbitrarily chosen) place names. Billings' tune evidently has little more to do with any particular town named Chester than his famous hymn "Africa" has to do with Africa. The idea behind this practice was that by labeling the tunes independently, one could sing them to different words without creating confusion (indeed, this later did happen; see below).

== Tune in version of 1778 ==
USMC Band playing "Chester" in 2014
William Schuman's 1956 arrangement of "Chester" being performed by the USMC Band in 2014.

Parts labeled "Treble, Counter, Tenor, and Bass" correspond to the modern SATB four-voice choir. However, the melody is in the tenor part, not the treble part.

== Lyrics ==
Although this cannot be established with certainty, it appears that these lyrics are by Billings himself.

Let tyrants shake their iron rod,
And Slav'ry clank her galling chains,
We fear them not, we trust in God,
New England's God forever reigns.

Howe and Burgoyne and Clinton too,
With Prescot and Cornwallis join'd,
Together plot our Overthrow,
In one Infernal league combin'd.

When God inspir'd us for the fight,
Their ranks were broke, their lines were forc'd,
Their ships were Shatter'd in our sight,
Or swiftly driven from our Coast.

The Foe comes on with haughty Stride;
Our troops advance with martial noise,
Their Vet'rans flee before our Youth,
And Gen'rals yield to beardless Boys.

What grateful Off'ring shall we bring?
What shall we render to the Lord?
Loud Halleluiahs let us Sing,
And praise his name on ev'ry Chord.

== Later uses ==
The song was later provided with religious (as opposed to patriotic) words by Philip Doddridge, and in this form is a favorite of Sacred Harp singers. The Doddridge words are as follows:

Let the high heav'ns your songs invite,
These spacious fields of brilliant light,
Where sun and moon and planets roll,
And stars that glow from pole to pole.

Sun, moon, and stars convey Thy praise,
'Round the whole earth and never stand,
So when Thy truth began its race,
It touched and glanced on ev'ry hand.

A slightly altered version of this text and the music by Billings was recorded in 1975 by the Old Stoughton Musical Society for their LP album, "An Appeal to Heaven".

20th century American composer William Schuman employed the tune in his New England Triptych (1956) and later expanded it into his Chester Overture.

Bernard Herrmann quoted the tune prominently in his score for the Colonial Williamsburg orientation film, Williamsburg: The Story of a Patriot.

An instrumental version of the song was used as background music for CBS's Bicentennial Minutes segments.

The HBO miniseries John Adams has a scene in episode 1 where an assembly of freemen sing this song together.

There is a concert band piece called Chester Variations, arranged by Elliot del Borgo.

The anthem features as background music in the 2008 strategy videogame Sid Meier's Civilization IV: Colonization. Also, an arrangement of the anthem features as the main theme for the American Civilization in the 2025 strategy videogame Civilization VII.

7th Regiment, a DCI Open Class drum corps, uses an altered version of Chester as its corps song.

== Book ==
- The Singing Master's Assistant, in which the final version of "Chester" was published, is in print today in a scholarly edition by Hans Nathan (University Press of Virginia, 1977, ISBN 0-8139-0839-6).
- The Stoughton Musical Society's Centennial Collection of Sacred Music, which contains a version with the later text and was published in Boston in 1878; reprint by DaCapo Press, 1980, with New Introduction by Roger L. Hall.
