= Singling =

Singling can refer to:

- Singling, France, locality in the commune of Gros-Réderching, Moselle department, France
- Singling (painting), painting by Joe Edwards (painter)
- Singling, Sikkim, community in Sikkim, India

== See also ==
- Single (disambiguation)
