= New England Triptych =

Composition by William Schuman

New England Triptych is an orchestral composition by American composer William Schuman, based on works of William Billings. The work lasts about 16 minutes, and is written for an orchestra comprising three flutes (3rd doubling piccolo), two oboes, English horn, E-flat clarinet, two clarinets, bass clarinet, two bassoons, four horns, three trumpets, three trombones, tuba, timpani, percussion (bass drum, cymbals, snare drum, tenor drum), and strings.

== Overview ==
Subtitled "Three Pieces for Orchestra After William Billings", New England Triptych is basically an expansion of Schuman's 1943 William Billings Overture (premiered by Artur Rodziński and the New York Philharmonic in 1944 but never published, and since withdrawn by the composer). New England Triptych was written in 1956 and premiered on October 28 of that year by the Orchestra of the University of Miami under the direction of Andre Kostelanetz, who had commissioned it.

Schuman prefaced his score with this note (and reprinted the pertinent texts for each hymn):

William Billings (1746–1800) is a major figure in the history of American music. His works capture the spirit of sinewy ruggedness, deep religiosity, and patriotic fervor that we associate with the Revolutionary period in American history. I am not alone among American composers who feel a sense of identity with Billings, which accounts for my use of his music as a departure point. These three pieces are not a "fantasy" nor "variations" on themes of Billings, but rather a fusion of styles and musical language.

The first movement, "Be Glad then, America", is built on these lines from Billings' text:

Yea, the Lord will answer
And say unto his people — behold
I will send you corn and wine and oil
And ye shall be satisfied therewith.

Be glad then, America,
Shout and rejoice.
Fear not O land,
Be glad and rejoice.
Halleluyah!

After a short introduction by solo timpani, the strings develop music that suggests the "Halleluyah" of the end. Trombones and trumpets start the main section in a varied setting of the words "Be Glad then, America, Shout and Rejoice." The solo timpani returns, leading to a fugal section based on the words "And Ye Shall Be Satisfied." The music gains momentum as combined themes lead to a climax, followed by a free adaptation of Billings' "Halleluyah" music and a final reference to the "Shout and Rejoice" music.

The second movement, "When Jesus Wept", begins with a solo by bassoon and soon the bassoon is accompanied by oboe. "When Jesus Wept" is a round and uses Billings' music in its original form.

When Jesus wept, the falling tear
in mercy flowed beyond all bound;
when Jesus mourned, a trembling fear
seized all the guilty world around.

The third movement, "Chester", is a patriotic hymn first published by Billings in 1770 and revised in 1778. The orchestral piece derives both from the spirit of the hymn and the marching song:

Let tyrants shake their iron rod,
And slavery clank her galling chains,
We fear them not, we trust in God,
New England's God forever reigns.
The foe comes on with haughty stride,
Our troops advance with martial noise,
Their vet'rans flee before our youth,
And gen'rals yield to beardless boys.

New England Triptych has become one of the works most indelibly associated with William Schuman. It also exists in an arrangement by the composer for concert band although the "Chester" movement was revised and lengthened.

== Recordings ==
Antal Doráti recorded New England Triptych for London Records (OS 26442) with the National Symphony Washington DC on 23-26 & 30 April 1975 and it was released in December 1976 on LP, in the US only. A CD issue has been published by The Doráti Edition (ADE 050).
