= Symphony No. 3 (Schuman) =

American composer William Schuman's Symphony No. 3 was completed on January 11, 1941, and premiered on October 17 of that year by the Boston Symphony Orchestra conducted by Serge Koussevitsky, to whom it is dedicated.

== Instrumentation ==
The symphony is scored for an orchestra consisting of piccolo (doubling flute), 2 flutes, 2 oboes, cor anglais, clarinet in E♭, 2 clarinets in B♭, bass clarinet, 2 bassoons, 4 horns in F, 4 trumpets in C, 4 trombones, tuba, snare drum, cymbals, bass drum, xylophone, timpani and strings. Third flute (doubling second piccolo), third oboe, third clarinet in B♭, third bassoon, contrabassoon, 4 more horns in F, and piano are also listed as "optional, but very desirable".

== Structure ==
Rather than the usual four movements, the symphony is in two parts, each consisting of two continuous sections in a tempo relation of slow-fast and given titles suggesting Baroque formal practices, though Schuman does not follow these forms strictly:

- Part I:
  - a) Passacaglia
  - b) Fugue
- Part II:
  - c) Chorale
  - d) Toccata
