= Gertrude des Clayes =

Scottish-born artist

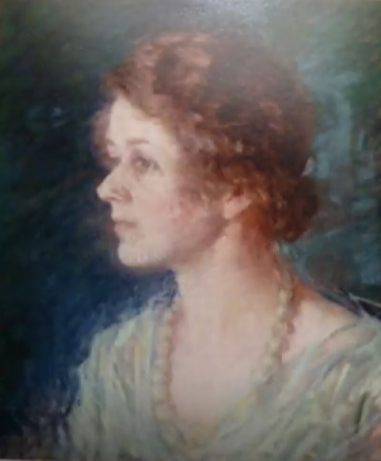
- 1929 self portrait
- Born: 1879; Aberdeen, Scotland
- Died: 23 August 1949 (aged 69–70); London, England
- Occupation: painter

Gertrude des Clayes RCA (1879 – 23 August 1949) was a Scottish-born artist who lived in England and Quebec, Canada. Des Clayes was best known as a portrait painter.

== Life ==
She was born in Aberdeen and studied at the Bushey School of Art and at the Académie Julian in Paris with Tony Robert-Fleury and Jules Lefebvre. She lived in London from 1906 to 1912 and received a medal from the French Salon in 1909. In 1911, she became a member of the National Portrait Society (founded in 1910). Des Clayes moved to Montreal in 1912. In 1914, she was elected an associate of the Royal Canadian Academy of Arts. One of her portraits appeared in The Fine Arts in Canada (1925) by Newton MacTavish. She returned to England in 1936.

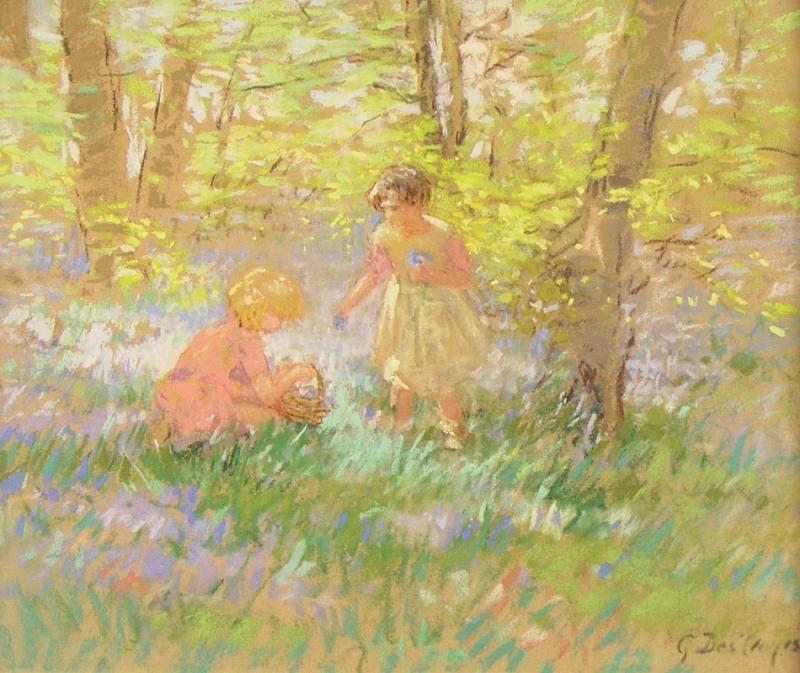
Children gathering Bluebells

Des Clayes created a portrait of railway entrepreneur Sir William Mackenzie's mother, Mary, using photographs taken of Mary's sisters and by studying Mary's daughters and granddaughters; no photographs were available of Mary Mackenzie herself who had died 27 years before des Clayes was born.

Des Clayes died in London in 1949.

Her sisters Berthe (1877–1967) and Alice (1890–1968) were also artists.

Her work is included in the collections of the Musée national des beaux-arts du Québec, National Gallery of Canada and the Montreal Museum of Fine Arts.
