= Symphony No. 10 (Schuman) =

The Symphony No. 10, subtitled American Muse, is the final symphony by the American composer William Schuman. The work was commissioned by the National Symphony Orchestra to commemorate the United States Bicentennial. Its premiere was performed by the National Symphony Orchestra under the conductor Antal Doráti on April 6, 1976. Schuman dedicated the symphony "to the country's creative artists, past, present and future."

== Composition ==
The symphony has a duration of roughly 30 minutes and is composed in three movements:

1. Con fuoco ("With fire")
2. Larghissimo
3. Presto – Andantino – Leggiero – Pesante – Presto possible

At the behest of the composer's wife, Schuman incorporated elements of his choral piece Pioneers! O Pioneers! (based on the eponymous poem by Walt Whitman) into the symphony. In the score program note, Schuman wrote, "My wife's instinct proved fortuitous, for recalling Pioneers and experiencing again its optimism was precisely what I needed to get me started on the Symphony. Optimism is, after all, an essential ingredient in understanding America's beginnings."

== Reception ==
Reviewing the work on disk with Schuman's Symphony No. 7, Alan G. Artner of the Chicago Tribune wrote, "Each presents long stretches of meditative music as well as Schuman's characteristically knotty struggle before blasts of positive energy bring them to conclusion." Tim Page of The New York Times was somewhat more critical of the piece, observing:

The Symphony No. 10 is subtitled American Muse and was written for the Bicentennial. It begins with a celebratory and virtuosic proclamation. For this listener, Mr. Schuman is at his weakest in such moments. Everything seemed busy and overstated, as if a writer, asked to make a paragraph stronger, were to add an exclamation point to the end of each sentence.

Despite this criticism, Page added, "The second movement, however, is masterly; a long, haunted nocturnal procession, superbly orchestrated and deeply compelling. After the finale, the house rang with bravos."
