= Symphony No. 6 (Schuman) =

The Symphony No. 6 is a symphony by the American composer William Schuman that was commissioned by the Dallas Symphony League. It was premiered by the Dallas Symphony Orchestra under the conductor Antal Doráti on February 27, 1949.

The symphony has a duration of roughly 27 minutes and is composed in one continuous movement. It is scored for a large orchestra comprising three flutes, two oboes, English horn, two clarinets, bass clarinet, two bassoons, contrabassoon, four horns, three trumpets, three trombones, tuba, timpani, two percussionists, and strings.

== Reception ==
Though the world premiere was poorly received by its Dallas audience, the piece has since been praised by music critics. Andrew Clements of The Guardian praised the symphony, remarking:

Schuman's music fits comfortably into the mould of mid-century American symphonism, and the edginess of Stravinskian neoclassicism is never far away. Yet at its best his works have moments of grandeur that are distinctly their own, and with its dark colouring and troubled undertow the Sixth Symphony, first performed in 1949, is one of his most impressive achievements on an architectural and emotional level.

The work was similarly praised by Lawrence A. Johnson of the Chicago Classical Review who wrote:

Schuman was not a tunesmith and this is not music that is easy to love. Astringent, densely woven and knottily contrapuntal, the music seems to reflect a damaged world haunted by the devastation of the war. Jagged shards of military fanfares and a breakout timpani solo burst out and the agitated fugal writing builds to a frenetic climax. Yet the prevailing mood is one of elegiac bleakness with slow, searching music framing the symphony, which closes with a slow ebbing away in an expression of exhausted despair.
