= Secular Cantata No. 2: A Free Song =

Music by William Schuman

Secular Cantata No. 2: A Free Song (October 16, 1942) is a cantata for chorus and orchestra by William Schuman, using text by Walt Whitman, that was awarded the first Pulitzer Prize for Music in 1943, after it was premiered by the Boston Symphony Orchestra (with the amateur Harvard-Radcliffe Chorus) under Serge Koussevitzky. Music Sales Classical describes it as containing, "granite-like blocks of dissonant harmony and sharp-edged counterpoint."

Either about 22 minutes or less than 14 in length, the form is as follows:

1. a. Too long, America
  b. Look down, fair moon
2. Song of the banner

The piece is modeled on Beethoven's Fifth.

The text was adapted from Whitman's Leaves of Grass (the Drum-Taps section), and Swayne (2011) describes it as the last of Schuman's pieces as, "a self-styled occasional progressive". Written during World War II (after being rejected for service) according to Schuman, "The first movement is a kind of requiem but more than just a prayer for the dead–it points a lesson. The 2nd movement is in complete contrast and is in the nature of a very militant 'pep talk.'" The final line is, "We hear Liberty!" Schuman says, "Since I cannot serve in the Specialist Corps I am trying to do what I can with my pen....It has wonderful words by Walt Whitman. If I've done my job well it can't help but be a moving patriotic affair."

Though Arthur Berger privately criticized the selection of poetry on aesthetic grounds, Wannamaker (1972) praises a A Free Song for avoiding jingoism: "A Free Song...combines lines from 'Long, Too Long, America' and 'Song of the Banner at Daybreak,' poems which have elements of the same patriotic fervor. By careful editing of phrases and lines, Schuman achieves a text that expresses only a desire for freedom for all mankind." Virgil Thomson called it, "superficially warlike". Berger also called the piece, "a real low", while Elliott Carter said it was, "well-intentioned enough but not convincingly realized" Meanwhile, Walter Piston admired the work.

Though as of January 2011 there was no commercially available recording, the piece is now available on two recordings.

== See also ==
- On Freedom's Ground (1984)
- Prayer in Time of War (1943)
- Steel Town (1944)
