= John Alexander Ferguson =

New Zealand-born Australian lawyer, judge, book collector and author

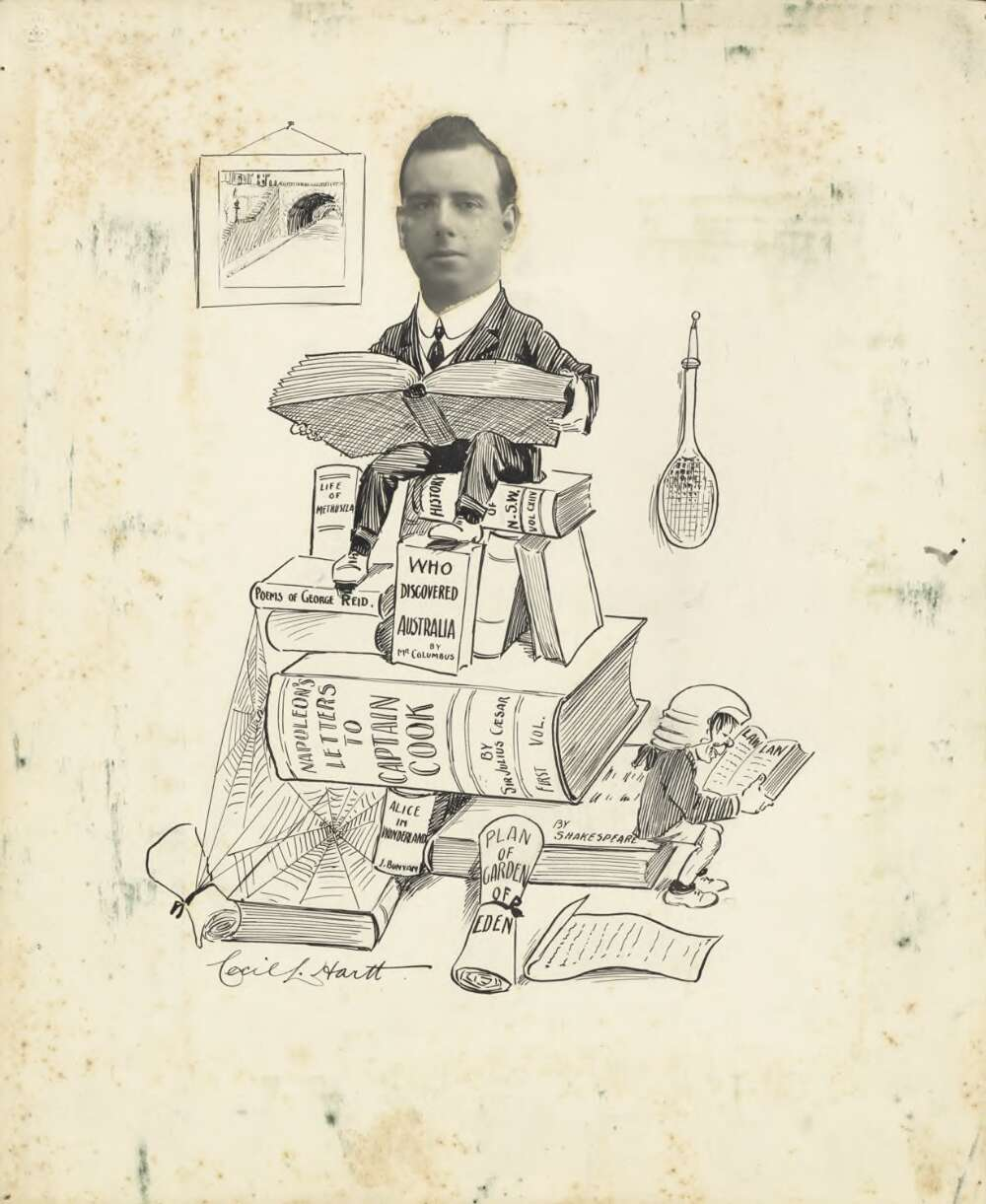
- Cartoon of John Alexander Ferguson by Cecil Lawrence Hartt, 1910s. Titled "J.A.F., Barrister and Book Collector," published in Sydneyites As We See 'Em, 1915. Ferguson later authored the seven-volume Bibliography of Australia.
- Born: 15 December 1881; Invercargill, New Zealand
- Died: 7 May 1969 (aged 87); Roseville, New South Wales, Australia
- Occupations: lawyer, judge, book collector, author
- Writing career
- Period: 1900–1969
- Notable work: Bibliography of Australia (1941–1969)

John Alexander Ferguson (15 December 1881 – 7 May 1969) was a New Zealand-born Australian lawyer, judge, book collector, and author. He is best known for writing the seven-volume Bibliography of Australia, a guide to books published prior to 1901 in and on the topic of Australia. He also practised labor law and had a career as a judge in the Industrial Commission of New South Wales.

== Life and family ==
John A. Ferguson was born 15 December 1881 in Invercargill, New Zealand, to Rev. John Ferguson and Isabella, née Adie (1854–1929). The family moved in 1894 to Sydney, Australia, where Rev. John was pastor at St Steven's Church.

In 1907, John A. married Bessie Robertson (1882–1937). They had four children, George Adie (1910–1998), Margaret Douglas (1912–2000), lawyer John Bruce (1914–1989), and Colin Scott (b. 1919) who died in 1943 in a Bristol Beaufort bomber accident while training in the Royal Australian Air Force. His grandson, John Ferguson (1937-2023), was an Australian publisher who was associated Angus & Robertson, the Halstead Press and John Ferguson Pty. Ltd.

In 1945, John A. married Dorothy Johnston (1916–1995). They had two children, Diana (1947–2022) and Alexander Stuart (1948–). At John A.'s death on 7 May 1969, the couple resided at 81 Clanville Rd., Roseville NSW.

== Education ==
Ferguson received a B.A. in 1902 and an Ll.B. in 1905 from the University of Sydney.

== Legal career ==
Ferguson joined the bar on 27 May 1905. He specialized in labor law and appeared before the High Court of Australia and the Judicial Committee of the Privy Council. In 1938, he was appointed a judge with the Industrial Commission of New South Wales, precursor to today's Industrial Relations Commission of New South Wales. He was active with that body until 1951 and formally retired in 1952.

== National Library of Australia ==
The Ferguson Collection of the National Library of Australia contains John A. Ferguson's extensive collections, including particular strengths in Australia and the Pacific Islands.

== Honors and awards ==
Ferguson was made a fellow of the Royal Australian Historical Society in 1927. He received an honorary doctorate from the University of Sydney, on 29 April 1955. He was made OBE in 1957 and received a knighthood in 1961.

== Papers ==
John A Ferguson's personal papers are archived in the National Library of Australia along with his collections mentioned above.

== Selected bibliography ==
=== Bibliography (genre) ===
- A Bibliography of the New Hebrides and a History of the Mission Press. Vol. 1–3. Sydney: Privately Published. 1917–1943. OCLC 846094926.
- "Studies in Australian Bibliography III: The Literature Relating to "The Scottish Martyrs". Journal of the Royal Australian Historical Society. 13 (3–4): 202–208, 245–250. 1927.
- Bibliography of Australia. Vol. 1–7. Sydney: Angus & Robertson. 1941–1969. OCLC 1113386.

=== Legal articles ===
- "A Defect in our Commercial Law and a Federal Responsibility". Commonwealth Law Review. 3: 59–63. 1905.
- "Some Doubtful Points Incident to the Relation of Parent and Child". Commonwealth Law Review. 4: 57–68. 1906.
- "Some Modern Applications of the Writ of Prohibition". Commonwealth Law Review. 6–7. 1908.
