= Symphony No. 4 (Schuman) =

The Symphony No. 4 is an orchestral symphony by the American composer William Schuman. The work was composed on a Guggenheim Fellowship grant awarded to Schuman in 1939. The piece was given its world premiere by the Cleveland Orchestra under the direction of Artur Rodziński on January 22, 1942.

The symphony has a duration of roughly 25 minutes and is composed in three numbered movements. It is scored for a large orchestra comprising 3 flutes (3rd doubling piccolo), 3 oboes, English horn, 3 clarinets, E♭ clarinet, bass clarinet, 3 bassoons, contrabassoon, 4 horns, 3 trumpets, 3 trombones, tuba, timpani, 3 percussionists, and strings.

== Reception ==
In a contemporary review of the symphony, the composer and music critic Virgil Thomson called it "vague and more than a little diffuse." In 2005, however, Lawrence A. Johnson of the Sun-Sentinel viewed the work more favorably, writing:

The music accelerates into a con spirito section that shows the influence of Roy Harris, culminating in a kaleidoscopic high-energy coda with triumphant brass fanfares. Marked "Tenderly, simply," the second movement is subdued and introspective with ruminative wind solos. The composer's acclaimed polyphonic writing is spotlighted in the animated finale with several contributions by all orchestra sections.
