= John Ferguson (Presbyterian minister) =

Scottish born Australian Presbyterian minister (1852–1925)

- Born: 27 December 1852; Shiels, Aberdeenshire, Scotland
- Died: 1 March 1925 (aged 72); Kings Cross, New South Wales, Australia
- Resting place: South Head cemetery
- Education: New College, Edinburgh
- Occupation: Presbyterian minister
- Employer(s): St Stephen's Church, Sydney
- Known for: Presbyterian minister, acting principal, school chaplain and chairman
- Title: Reverend
- Board member of: Presbyterian Ladies' College, Sydney; The Scots College; St Andrew's College
- Spouse: Isabella Adie (m. 1881–1925)
- Children: 5

John Ferguson (27 December 1852 – 1 March 1925) was a Scottish-born Australian Presbyterian minister.

== Early life ==
John Ferguson was born on 27 December 1852, at Shiels, Aberdeenshire, Scotland, the third son of William Ferguson, a farmer, and his wife Elizabeth, née Mitchell. He migrated to Otago, New Zealand, with his parents in 1862.

Upon leaving school at the age of 14, he became a pupil-teacher, and also acted as laboratory assistant in the chemistry department at the University of Otago. Ferguson soon realised his desire to enter the ministry, and subsequently, the congregation of Knox Church at Dunedin, gave him a bursary to complete the full course at New College, Edinburgh.

== Career ==
Licensed as a probationer by the Free Church presbytery of Deer at Stuartfield, Old Deer, Aberdeenshire, Ferguson returned to Otago and was ordained to the ministry on 20 May 1880. He was then sent to work with the miners at Tuapeka in the Central Otago goldfields.

Ferguson married Isabella Adie, from Old Deer, on 4 February 1881 at Dunedin. He soon became colleague and successor to A. Stobo at Invercargill, where he remained in full charge for fourteen years. In August 1894 Ferguson was inducted to St Stephen's, Phillip Street, Sydney, the largest Presbyterian congregation in Australia. His ministry in Sydney was very successful.

Ferguson took full part in Australian religious and public life, becoming moderator-general in 1909. His inaugural address, published as The Economic Value of the Gospel, caused controversy in Melbourne and praise from trade union leaders. Labor politician William Morris (Billy) Hughes (who was to become Prime Minister in 1915), said:

The new moderator preaches a gospel all sufficient, all powerful. He grapples with the problems of poverty … he insists on justice being done, though the heavens fall. I advise every citizen to read every word of it.

As the senior Presbyterian chaplain in New South Wales, Ferguson preached on many special occasions, including the arrival of H.M.A.S. Australia and the memorial services at the end of the South African War and World War I. Ferguson's ecumenical interests led him to seek an audience with the Pope on a visit to Rome in 1914, an action that evoked much criticism in Sydney.

On 22 May 1913, following the resignation of Andrew Harper, Ferguson was appointed Senior Chaplain and chairman of the exclusive Presbyterian Ladies' College, Sydney Council, retiring in 1923 due to ill health. Whilst in this role, he actively worked towards the planning and establishment of the Presbyterian Ladies' College, Pymble in 1916, a branch of the Presbyterian Ladies' College, Sydney. He was also the first chairman of the board of the Australian Inland Mission, a member of the Council of The Scots College and St Andrew's Theological College, and vice-president of the Highland Society of New South Wales. He was also to become the Acting Principal of St Andrew's Theological College at the University of Sydney in 1917.

It is said that Ferguson was a "tall, dark-haired man, with a drooping moustache and a commanding presence. An attractive preacher, with a genial and informal friendliness, he seldom forgot a face or a name and few entered St Stephen's without a warm personal greeting. He was admired and respected by all the Churches."

== Death ==
In October 1924, Ferguson collapsed in the pulpit of St. Stephen's Church and subsequently died at his home, 'Atherton', on Bayswater Road, on 1 March 1925. He was survived by his wife, three sons, including Sir John, judge of the New South Wales Industrial Commission and author of the Australian National Bibliography; Eustace, a notable pathologist and entomologist, and by two daughters. He was buried at South Head Cemetery in Sydney.

== Legacy ==
Following Ferguson's death, a memorial hall and tablet were erected at St Stephen's Church, Sydney in his honour. Ferguson House at the Presbyterian Ladies' College, Sydney is also named after him.

== Notable descendants ==
- John Alexander Ferguson, (Sir), compiled the first Bibliography of Australia.
- Eustace William Ferguson, pathologist and entomologist

== See also ==
- List of Australian Presbyterians
- Notable Aberdonians
- Presbyterian Church of Australia
