= Robert Sivell =

Scottish portrait artist 1888–1958

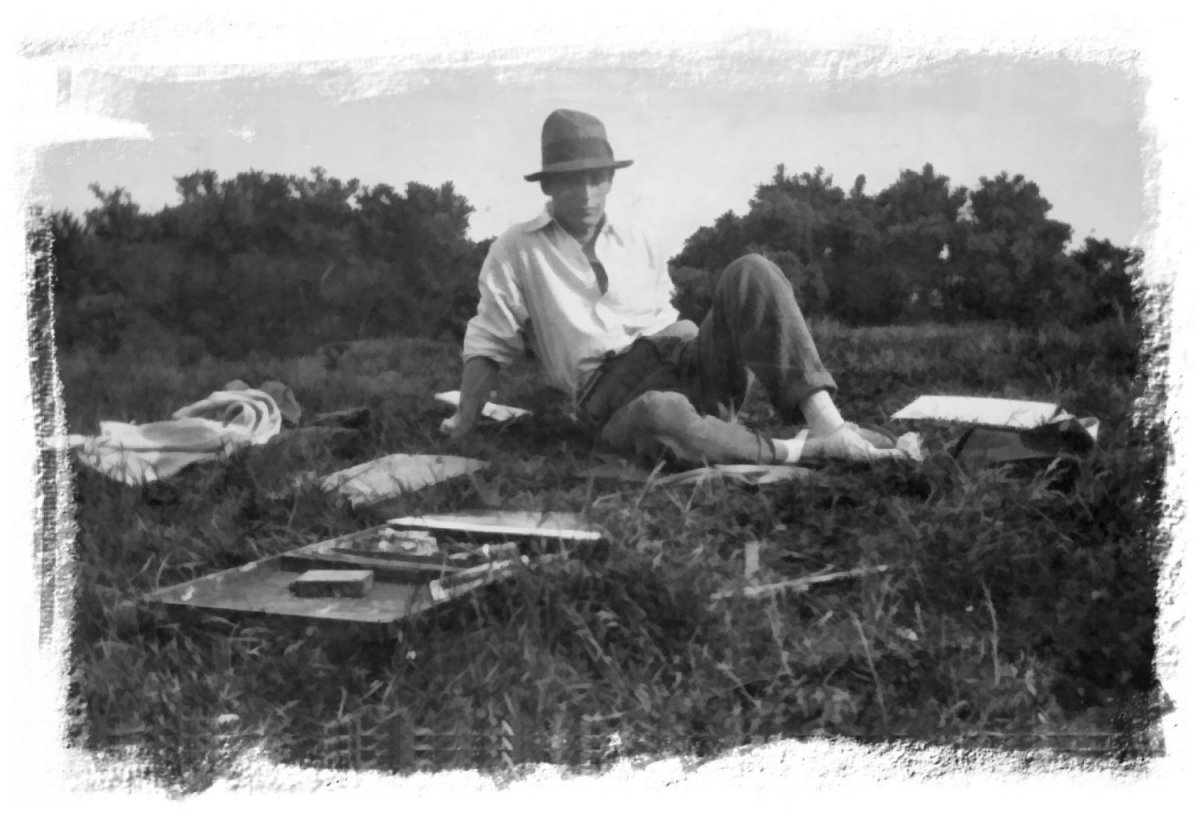
- Image of Robert Sivell at a family picnic
- Born: 16 October 1888; Paisley, Scotland
- Died: 21 April 1958 (aged 69); Kirkcudbright, Scotland
- Education: Glasgow School of Art
- Known for: Portrait painting
- Awards: Guthrie Award, 1930

Robert Sivell RSA (October 16, 1888 – April 21, 1958) was a Scottish portrait artist active in the first half of the 20th century. He was a founder member of the Glasgow Society of Artists and Sculptors in 1919.

== Biography ==
Sivell was born in Paisley, Renfrewshire, but lived in Kirkcudbright, Galloway for long periods of his adult life.

While beginning evening studies at the Glasgow School of Art with Fra Newbery in 1908, Sivell was still working as an apprentice engineer and he had to abandon the art course in 1910. He lacked the means to attend school full time. In 1912 he travelled to Canada and also visited Paris and Florence, but he returned to Scotland in 1914 as the country readied for war, using his engineering skills to fit out trawlers and drifters for mine-sweeping and other operations. He also worked on the Boom Defence of Cromarty. In 1916 he joined the Merchant Navy. When he left it, Sivell moved to Glasgow, where he could paint evenings and weekends, sharing a studio with Archibald McGlashon.

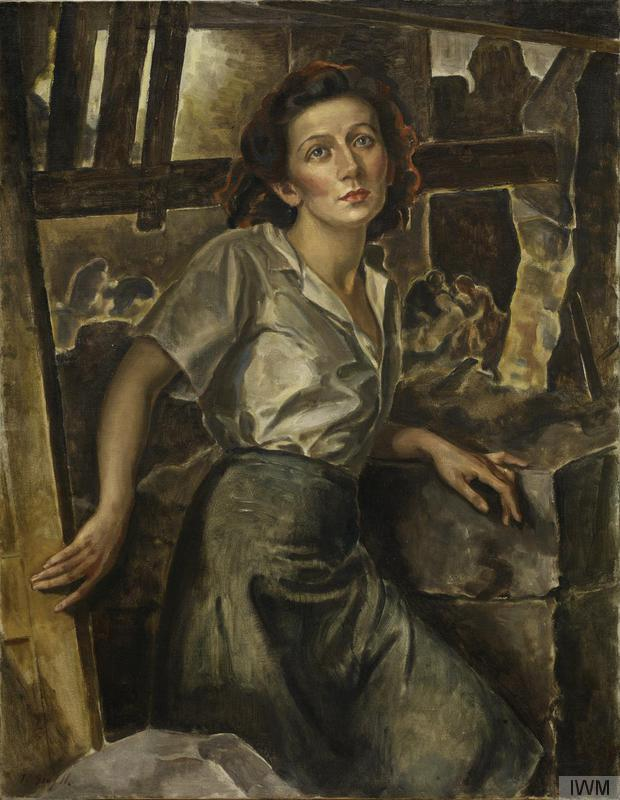
Mrs Marion Patterson, GM (1942) (Art.IWM ART LD 3030)

Sivell met Isobel Sayers from Kirkcudbright while she was visiting Glasgow; they married in 1923. They rented a bungalow on the River Dee across from Kirkcudbright. They had one child, a daughter, Elspeth Dolores. The couple moved to Kirkcudbright at some point after 1924, building a house and studio at The Hollow, Stell.

Together with James Cowie and Archibald McGlashan, Sivell was a founder member of the Glasgow Society of Artists and Sculptors in 1919. Their exhibitions took place at the McLellan Galleries and attracted some controversy over the exclusion of work by non-members. Sivell travelled at some point in those years to Italy, which had a strong influence on his work.

In the 1930s Sivell moved to Aberdeen to teach at Grays School of Art, serving as Head of Drawing and Painting from 1942 to 1954. His pupils included Joe Edwards, Taylor Bremner, Gordon Stewart Cammeron, and Alberto Morrocco, who built up a large collection of Sivell's work. In 1936 he was elected an Associate of the Royal Scottish Academy (ARSA) and in 1943 a full member (RSA). While at Gray's, he undertook a large-scale painting project consisting of larger-than-life murals in a lecture and exhibition hall within the Aberdeen University Union on Gallowgate. This project involved two of his pupils (Alberto Morrocco and Gordon S Cameron) in an effort that began in 1938 and continued until his retirement in 1953, being interrupted by World War II. During the war Sivell completed a number of short-term commissions for the War Artists Advisory Committee. Among these was one of a Scottish policeman and two of women who had both been awarded the George Medal. During his years of teaching, Sivell continued to paint commissioned portraits and subjects of his own choosing, and to exhibit in galleries and exhibitions.

Sivell retired in 1954 and returned to Kirkcudbright, where he died in 1958. He and his wife, Isobel (died 1962), were buried on the slope behind his home and studio, The Hollow, Stell, according to their wishes.

== Memorials ==
The Aberdeen Students' Union, where his murals stand, was named Sivell's Bar in his memory. After Aberdeen University sold the building, the murals were given historic status and protection by the city, but they have been inaccessible to the public for many years, with the building and murals listed "at risk" in the Buildings At Risk Register for Scotland. Sivell was sculpted by his friend Benno Schotz, and while photos of this bust exist, its current location and condition are unknown. In 1960 the Arts Council Scottish Committee held a memorial exhibition of his work in Edinburgh.

== Public works ==
At least 120 paintings by Sivell are held in Aberdeen art Museum, a large number having been donated by Alberto Morrocco. Many of his portraits are executed in oil on wood and have a dark and foreboding tone.

- Wall murals, Aberdeen University Student Union, Gallowgate (1938–40)
- Studies for mural including The Grape Harvest, Pastoral, Medical and The Creation, Aberdeen Art Gallery
- Elspeth (his daughter), Aberdeen Art Gallery
- Dawn, Aberdeen Art Gallery
- Noon, Aberdeen Art Gallery
- Bathers, Aberdeen Art Gallery
- Portrait of Francis Garden, Aberdeen Art Gallery
- Portrait of a Soldier (Pt Alistair Paterson), Aberdeen Art Gallery
- Mrs Marion Patterson, recipient of the George Medal, Imperial War Museum, London
- Woman in a Shawl, Glasgow Museums
- Dehydration of Herrings, Glasgow Museums
- Sisters, National Museum of Northern Ireland
- Eve, City of Edinburgh Council
- Captain Benjamin Bryant, Aberdeen Art Gallery
- Spring, Aberdeen Art Gallery
- Family Group, Aberdeen Art Gallery
- Senorita, Perth & Kinross Council
- The Cello Player, Aberdeen Art Gallery
- Coats Memorial Church, Paisley Art Gallery
- The Twins of Craigie Hall, Paisley Art Gallery
- Phyllis Bone, Gracefield Collection, Kirkcudbright
- Study of Sir George Pirie
- The Provost, Kirkcudbright Tolbooth Art Centre
- The Drawing Book, McLean Museum and Art Gallery
- Lamont in Lamplight (unfinished) (1958)
