= Vincenzo Pucitta =

Italian composer (1778–1861)

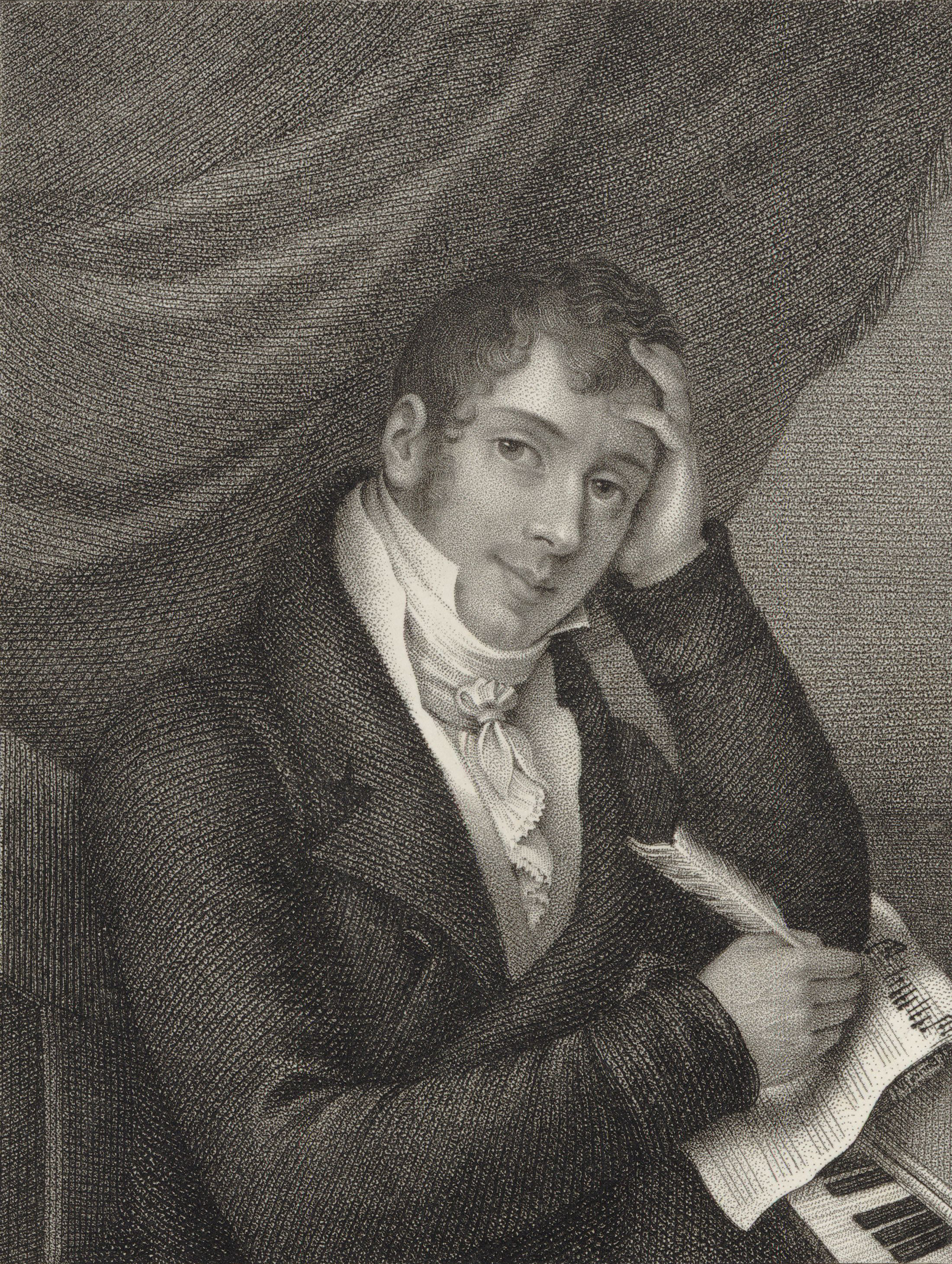
- 1812 engraving of Pucitta
- Born: 17 February 1778; Civitavecchia, Italy
- Died: 20 December 1861 (aged 83); Milan, Italy

Vincenzo Pucitta (or Puccitta; 17 February 1778 – 20 December 1861) was an Italian composer. Born in Civitavecchia, he wrote more than 20 operas during his career. One of his works, La Vestale, after its premiere in London (1810), was also sung in Lisbon (1816), Milan (1816) and Rio de Janeiro (1817). He died in Milan, aged 83.

== Operas ==
- Le nozze senza sposa (1800, Parma)
- Bianca de' Rossi (1800, Florence)
- L'amor platonico (1800, Lucca)
- Il fuoruscito (1801, Milan)
- Teresa e Wilk (1802, Venice)
- Werter e Carlotta (1802, Venice)
- Il puntiglio (Furberia e puntiglio) (1802, Milan)
- La perfidia scoperta (1803, Venice)
- Zelinda e Lindoro (1803, Venice)
- Lauretta (1803, Padua)
- La burla fortunata ossia I due prigionieri (1804, Venice);
- Lo sposo di Lucca (1805, Venice)
- Andromaca (1806)
- Il marchese d'un giorno ovvero Gli sposi felici (1808, Livorno)
- La caccia di Enrico IV (1809, London)
- La vestale (1810, London)
- Il trionfo di Rosselane ossia Le tre sultane (1811, London)
- Adolfo e Chiara (1812, Turin)
- Ginevra di Scozia (1812)
- Boadicca (1813)
- Il feudatario (1813, Trieste)
- Aristodemo (1814, London)
- Gli due prigionieri ossia Adolfo e Clara (1814, London)
- L'orgoglio avvilito (1815, Paris)
- La principessa in campagna o Il marchese nell'imbarazzo (La principessa bizarra) (1817, Paris)
- Il maestro di cappella (1818, Trieste)
- La festa del villaggio (1822, Rome)
- La Fausse Agnès (1824, Paris)
