= Rose of Sharon (William Billings song) =

Song by William Billings

"Rose of Sharon" is a sacred choral anthem composed by William Billings. It was first published in The Singing Master's Assistant (1778) as An Anthem, Solomons Songs, Chap 2, and was subsequently published in many early American tunebooks, including The Southern Harmony and The Sacred Harp. It continues to be a popular song to perform by early music ensembles, and AllMusic declares it "one of his best-loved works today".

The poetry of the anthem is derived from the second chapter of the Song of Solomon:

I am the rose of Sharon, and the lily of the valleys.
As the lily among thorns, so is my love among the daughters.
As the apple tree among the trees of the wood,
so is my beloved among the sons.
I sat down under his shadow with great delight,
and his fruit was sweet to my taste.

He brought me to the banqueting house,
his banner over me was love.

Stay me with flagons, comfort me with apples:
for I am sick of love.
I charge you, O ye daughters of Jerusalem,
by the roes, and by the hinds of the field,
that ye stir not up, nor awake my love, till he please.

The voice of my beloved! behold, he cometh
leaping upon the mountains,
skipping upon the hills.

My beloved spake, and said unto me,
Rise up, my love, my fair one, and come away.

For, lo, the winter is past,
the rain is over and gone.
