= Alice des Clayes =

Scottish artist

- Born: 22 December 1890; Aberdeen, Scotland
- Died: 1968 (aged 77–78); London, England
- Education: Bushey School of Art with Lucy Kemp Welch; at Newlyn; and at Ambleteuse with Dudley Hardy
- Known for: Painter of animals

Alice des Clayes (1890–1968) was a Scottish painter, sister to Berthe des Clayes. Born in Aberdeen. She studied at the Bushey School of Art with Lucy Kemp Welch, who specialized in painting horses; at Newlyn and at Ambleteuse with Dudley Hardy. She emigrated to Montreal Quebec in 1914. In 1920 she was made a non-resident member of the Royal Canadian Academy of Arts. Alice des Clayes returned to England in 1938.

Her work is included in the collections of the Musée national des beaux-arts du Québec and the National Gallery of Canada.
