= Berthe des Clayes =

- Born: 1877; Aberdeen, United Kingdom
- Died: 1968 (aged 90–91); Devon, United Kingdom
- Known for: Painter

Berthe des Clayes (1877–1968) was a Scots-born artist who lived in England and Canada.

She was born in Aberdeen and studied at the Bushey School of Art with H. Herkomer and at the Académie Julian in Paris with Tony Robert-Fleury and Jules Lefebvre. From 1906 to 1912, she lived in London, she emigrated to Montreal in 1912 where she lived until 1919. In 1920, she moved to Chorleywood in England. From 1931 to 1951, she lived in Montreal. Des Clayes was living in Devon in England in 1967 and died there the following year.

She worked in oil, watercolour and pastel. Des Clayes won the Jessie Dow Prize twice. She illustrated the books Here and There in Montreal and the Island of Montreal (1931) by Charles W. Stokes and Acadia (Nova Scotia) by the Dominion Atlantic Railway. She showed with the Royal Canadian Academy of Arts from 1912 to 1947.

Her younger sisters Alice (1890–1968) and Gertrude (1879–1949) were also artists.

Her work is held in the collections of the Musée national des beaux-arts du Québec, the National Gallery of Canada, the Art Gallery of Ontario, the University of Calgary, the University of British Columbia, and the Library and Archives Canada.
