= Jennifer Lee (potter) =

British potter

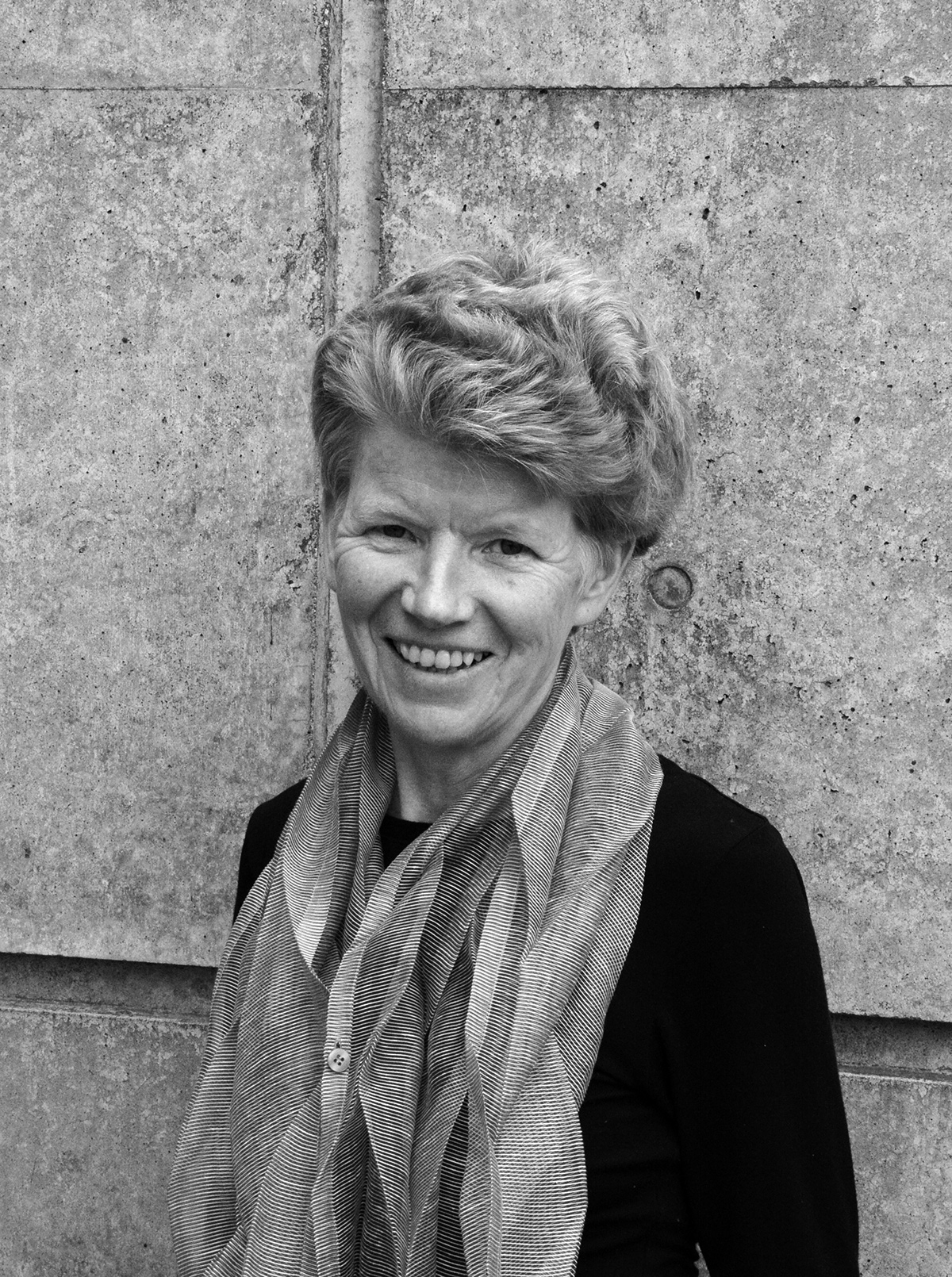
- Jennifer Lee (2014)
- Born: 1956 (age 69–70); Aberdeen, United Kingdom
- Education: Edinburgh College of Art; Royal College of Art
- Known for: Ceramics
- Awards: LOEWE Craft Prize winner 2019

Jennifer Elizabeth Lee OBE (born 1956) is a Scottish ceramic artist with an international reputation. Lee's distinctive pots are hand built using traditional pinch and coil methods. She has developed a method of colouring the pots by mixing metallic oxides into the clay before making. Her work is held in over forty museums and public collections worldwide, including the Metropolitan Museum of Art in New York, the Philadelphia Museum of Art, the Los Angeles County Museum and the Victoria and Albert Museum. In 2018 Lee won the Loewe Craft Prize, an award initiated by Jonathan Anderson in 2017. The prize was presented to her at an awards ceremony at The Design Museum in London.

== Early life and education ==
Lee was born in North East Scotland, daughter of a farmer. She was educated in Aberdeenshire. In 1974 Lee started a course in physiotherapy at Woolmanhill Hospital, Aberdeen. Lee's interest in ceramics began after meeting Robin Welch in Suffolk in 1974. She worked with Robin and Jenny Welch during the summers of 1975 and 1976 as a studio assistant.

From 1975 to 1979 she studied ceramics and tapestry at Edinburgh College of Art under the tutelage of Tony Franks. On completing her studies she was awarded the David Gordon Memorial Trust Prize and Andrew Grant Travelling Scholarship. In 1979–1980 she spent eight months travelling in the USA where she researched South-West Native American prehistoric ceramics and visited pueblos. She met with contemporary West Coast potters, including Peter Voulkos, Paul Soldner, Ron Nagle, Michael Frimkess and Viola Frey. In New Mexico she visited Ken Price and Rick Dillingham in their studios and in Oregon she took part in workshops with Paul Soldner, Stephen De Staebler and Betty Feves.

From 1980 to 1983 she studied ceramics at the Royal College of Art in London. Her tutors there included Professor Lord David Queensberry, Philip Rawson, Eduardo Paolozzi and Gillian Lowndes.

== Residencies ==
2014 Guest artist in residence Shigaraki Ceramic Cultural Park, Shigaraki, Japan
2015 Guest artist in residence Shigaraki Ceramic Cultural Park, Shigaraki, Japan
2018 Artist in residence Shigaraki Ceramic Cultural Park, Shigaraki, Japan
2019 Guest artist in Residence, Mashiko Museum of Ceramic Art, Mashiko, Japan

== Major exhibitions ==
Jennifer Lee has had retrospective exhibitions of her work at the Röhsska Museum in Göteborg, Jennifer Lee – Handbyggda Stengodskärl 1979–1993, Sweden in 1993, Aberdeen Museums and Art Galleries, Jennifer Lee – Handbuilt Ceramics 1979–1994, Scotland in 1994. In 2009 Lee was invited by Issey Miyake to exhibit in a three-person exhibition alongside Lucie Rie and Ernst Gamperl at the Miyake Issey Foundation gallery 21 21 DESIGN SIGHT in Tokyo. 'U-TSU-WA'. The installation was designed by Japanese architect Tadao Ando. In 2019 Lee had a major exhibition of ceramics and drawings at Kettle's Yard, University of Cambridge, Jennifer Lee: the potter’s space curated by Sarah Griffin and exhibition design by the architect Jamie Fobert.

Jennifer Lee lives and works in London and regularly exhibits in the UK and Japan.

She was appointed Officer of the Order of the British Empire (OBE) in the 2021 New Year Honours for services to ceramics.

== Selected museum exhibitions ==
2019 – Salisbury Collection of Studio Ceramics, Fitzwilliam Museum, Cambridge, UK.
2019 – Modernity & Elegance: The British Collection by Bernard Leach, Lucie Rie, Hans Coper, and Jennifer Lee, The Museum of Ceramic Art, Hyogo, Japan.
2019 – POTs-the Vessel, The National Gallery, Bangkok, Thailand.
2019 – 75th Scripps College Ceramic Annual, Ruth Chandler Williamson Gallery, Scripps College Claremont, California, US.
2018 – The Diana Reitberger Collection, The Gardiner Museum, Toronto, Canada.
2018 – The Dramatic Vessel, Iwate Museum of Art, Morioka, Japan.
2018 – LOEWE FOUNDATION Craft Prize 2018, Design Museum, London, UK.
2018 – Things of Beauty Growing: British Studio Ceramics, Fitzwilliam Museum, Cambridge, UK.
2018 – Handheld, Aldrich Contemporary Art Museum, Connecticut, US.
2017 – The Ehrlich Collection of American and British Ceramics, San Angelo Museum of Fine Arts, Texas, US.
2017 – Things of Beauty Growing: British Studio Ceramics, Yale Center for British Art, New Haven, US.
2017 – The Dramatic Vessel, The Museum of Contemporary Ceramic Art, Shigaraki, Japan.
2015 – Vessels: The Spirit of Modern British Ceramics, Mashiko Museum of Ceramic Art, Japan.
2014 – Toward a DESIGN MUSEUM JAPAN, 21_21 DESIGN SIGHT, Tokyo, Japan.
2014 – British Ceramics from Bernard Leach to New Generation, The Museum of Contemporary Ceramic Art, Shigaraki, Japan.
2013 – International Ceramics, Verkehr Museum, Shizuoka, Japan.
2013 – Friendship Forged in Fire: British Ceramics in America, American Museum of Ceramic Art, Pomona, California, US.
2011 – Contemporary British Studio Ceramics, The Mint Museum, Charlotte, North Carolina, US.
2009 – U-Tsu-Wa, 21_21 DESIGN SIGHT, Tokyo, Japan.
2009 – The CellMark Collection, Röhsska Museet, Göteborg, Sweden.
2008 – British Studio Ceramics – 20th Century Transformations, Buckinghamshire County Museum, Aylesbury, UK.
2006 – Puur Klei, Pottenbakkers Museum, Tegelen, The Netherlands.
2005 – Modern Pots: Lucie Rie, Hans Coper and their Contemporaries, Dulwich Picture Gallery, London, UK.
2004 – European Ceramics, Westerwald Museum, Germany.
2003 – British Studio Ceramics, Buckinghamshire County Museum, Aylesbury, UK.
2002 – Ceramic Modernism: Hans Coper, Lucie Rie and Their Legacy, The Gardiner Museum, Toronto, Canada.
2001 – Modern Pots, Sainsbury Centre for Visual Arts, Norwich, UK.
2001 – Bengt Julin’s Ceramics, Gustavsbergs Porslinsmuseum, Sweden.
2000 – Britisk Keramik.2000.dk, Keramikmuseet Grimmerhus, Denmark.
2000 – Color and Fire, Defining Moments in Studio Ceramics 1950–2000, Los Angeles County Museum of Art, Los Angeles (touring), US.
1999 – Current Context – New Ways of Seeing, Royal Museum, Edinburgh, UK.
1999 – Clay into Art, The Metropolitan Museum of Art, New York, US.
1998 – Gestaltendes Handwerk, Munich, Germany.
1998 – Collecting Craft, Hove Museum & Art Gallery, Hove, UK.
1998 – Spirit of the Times, Bowes Museum, Durham, UK.
1996 – Design im Wandel: Produkte, Fetische, Rituale, Übersee Museum of Anthropology and Ethnography, Bremen, Germany.

== Solo exhibitions from 2008 ==
2019 Jennifer Lee: the potter's space, Kettle's Yard, Cambridge.
2019 Jennifer Lee: A personal selection, The Fitzwilliam Museum, Cambridge.
2019 Jennifer Lee: Works from a Private Collection, Erskine, Hall & Coe.
2018 Sokyo Gallery, Kyoto.
2017 Gallery LVS, Seoul.
2016 Erskine, Hall & Coe, London.
2015 Jennifer Lee – Ceramics made in Shigaraki and London, Sokyo Gallery, Kyoto.
2015 Jennifer Lee, Tada no yume deshou ka, The Institute of Ceramic Studies Gallery Shigaraki.
2013 Erskine, Hall & Coe, London.
2012 Frank Lloyd Gallery, Los Angeles.
2010 Liverpool Street Gallery, Sydney.
2009 Frank Lloyd Gallery, Los Angeles.
2008 Galerie Besson, London.

== Public collections ==
Jennifer Lee's work is held in these collections

Canada
Gardiner Museum of Ceramic Art, Toronto

Germany
Europäisches Kunst Handwerk Landesgerwerbeamt, Stuttgart.
Kunstsammlungen der Veste Coburg.
Leipzig Museum of Applied Arts.
Museum für Kunst und Gewerbe, Hamburg.

Japan
The Museum of Ceramic Art, Hyogo.
Tochigi Prefectural Museum of Fine Arts.
Mashiko Museum of Ceramic Art, Mashiko.
The Museum of Contemporary Ceramic Art, Shigaraki.

New Zealand
Hawke's Bay Museum & Art Gallery, Napier.

North America
Alfred Ceramic Art Museum, New York.
Carnegie Museum of Art, Pittsburgh, Pennsylvania.
Crocker Art Museum, Sacramento, California.
Long Beach Museum of Art, California.
Long House Reserve Collection, New York.
Los Angeles County Museum of Art, California.
Minneapolis Institute of Arts, Minnesota.
Philadelphia Museum of Art, Pennsylvania.
Scripps College, Claremont, California.
The Metropolitan Museum of Art, New York.

South Korea
Amorepacific Museum, Seoul.

Sweden
CellMark, Göteborg.
Nationalmuseum, Stockholm.
Röhsska Museum, Göteborg.

Switzerland
Musée Bellerive, Zurich.
Musée Ariana, Geneva.

United Kingdom
Aberdeen Art Gallery and Museums.
Ashmolean Museum, Oxford.
British Museum.
Buckinghamshire County Museum.
Contemporary Art Society, London.
Crafts Council Collection, London.
Fitzwilliam Museum, Cambridge.
Glasgow Museum and Art Galleries.
The Hepworth Wakefield, Wakefield.
Hove Museum and Art Gallery.
Leeds City Art Gallery.
Middlesbrough Institute of Modern Art.
National Museum Wales.
Norwich Castle Museum.
Peters Foundation, London.
Royal Museum, Edinburgh.
Sainsbury Centre for Visual Arts, University of East Anglia.
Scottish Collection, SDA, Edinburgh.
Thamesdown Collection, Museum and Art Gallery, Swindon.
Trustees Savings Bank Collection, London.
Victoria and Albert Museum, London.

== Bibliography ==
- 2020 – House of crafts, Korean Craft Museum, Cheongju, South Korea.
- 2019 – Jennifer Lee: the potter's space, Kettle's Yard, Cambridge.
- 2019 – Jennifer Lee: Works from a Private Collection, Erskine, Hall & Coe.
- 2019 – Clay and Abstraction: When Memories Become Form, Mashiko Museum of Ceramic Art, Mashiko, Japan
- 2087 – Loewe Foundation Craft Prize.
- 2017 – Things of Beauty Growing: British Studio Pottery, Yale Center for British Art, New Haven, US and Fitzwilliam Museum, Cambridge, UK. ISBN 9780300227468
- 2017 – Jennifer Lee: Ceramic and Drawing, Gallery LVS, Seoul, South Korea.
- 2015 – Jennifer Lee. Ceramics made in Shigaraki and London, Sokyo Gallery, Kyoto, Japan.
- 2013 – Friendship Forged in Fire: British Ceramics in America. American Museum of Ceramic Art, Pomona, California, US. ISBN 0981672876
- 2012 – Falls the Shadow, Jennifer Lee, texts: Tanya Harrod and Edmund de Waal, Atlas, London, UK.
- 2011 – Richard Zakin, Ceramics: Mastering the Craft, Krause Publications. ISBN 9780873418676
- 2011 – Vessels: The Spirit of Modern British Ceramics, Mashiko Museum of Ceramic Art, Japan.
- 2010 – Contemporary British Studio Ceramics: The Grainer Collection, Annie Carlano (Editor), Tanya Harrod, Glenn Adamson, 2010 – Michelle Mickey, Yale University Press, US. ISBN 9780300167191
- 2010 – David Whiting, Modern British Potters and Their Studios, A&C Black, London, UK. ISBN 9780713687323
- 2009 – U-Tsu-Wa, Kyuryudo Art-Publishing Co, Tokyo, Japan. ISBN 4763009079
- 2009 – The Cellmark Collection, Cellmark, Göteborg, Sweden.
- 2009 – Susan and Jan Peterson, Craft and Art of Clay, Prentice Hall, US, Laurence King, London. ISBN 0131895982
- 2009 – Susan and Jan Peterson, Working With Clay, Prentice Hall, US, Laurence King, London. ISBN 1856696057
- 2009 – Emmanuel Cooper, Twentieth Century International Ceramics, Thames & Hudson, London. ISBN 0500514879
- 2008 – Jeffrey Jones, Studio Pottery in Britain, 1900–2005, A&C Black, London. ISBN 9780713670134
- 2008 – Alun Graves, Jennifer Lee, Galerie Besson, London.
- 2008 – Contemporary Studio Ceramics, California State University, Sacramento.
- 2007 – Peter Siemssen Ceramics – A Lifelong Passion, Collection Peter Siemssen Foundation, Arnoldsche Art Publishers, Stuttgart. ISBN 3897902567
- 2007 – James Graham & Sons 1857–2007, James Graham & Sons, New York.
- 2006 – Michael Hardy, Coiling, A&C Black, London. ISBN 0713668903
- 2005 – Cyril Frankel, Modern Pots: Hans Coper, Lucie Rie & Their Contemporaries: Ceramics from the Lisa Sainsbury Collection, exhibition guide, Dulwich Picture Gallery. ISBN 0946009368
- 2005 – Biennale Européene de Ceramique Contemporaines, Maison de l’Outil et de la Pensée Ouvriere, Troyes, France. ISBN 2-915829-05-5
- 2005 – Celebrating 30 years of the Crafts Council Shop at the Victoria & Albert Museum, Crafts Council, London.
- 2004 – Jane Perryman, Naked Clay, A&C Black, London. ISBN 9781408111055
- 2004 – Richard Zakin, Electric Kiln Ceramics, 3rd edition, Krause publications. ISBN 0873496043
- 2003 – Betty Blandino, Coiled Pottery Traditional and Contemporary Ways, A&C Black, London. ISBN 9780713666465
- 2003 – Jennifer Lee, New Work, Galerie Besson, London.
- 2002 – Jennifer Lee, Serene Beauty: Lucie Rie Retrospective, The Shigaraki Ceramic Cultural Park, The Museum of Contemporary Ceramic Art, Japan.
- 2002 – Paul Rice, British Studio Ceramics, Crowood Press.
- 2002 – Susan Peterson, Craft and the Art of Clay, Prentice Hall, US. ISBN 0133744639
- 2002 – Ceramic Modernism: Hans Coper, Lucie Rie and Their Legacy, The Gardiner Museum of Ceramic Art, Toronto.
- 2001 – 1st World Ceramics Biennale, Ichon World Ceramic Centre Korea.
- 2001 – Modern Pots: Ceramics from the Lisa Sainsbury Collection, Sainsbury Centre for Visual Arts. ISBN 0500975957
- 2000 – Jo Lauria, Color and Fire Defining Moments in Studio Ceramics 1950–2000, Los Angeles County Museum of Art, Rizzoli. ISBN 9780847822546
- 2000 – Susan Peterson, Contemporary Ceramics, Thames & Hudson and Calman/King. ISBN 1856691888
- 2000 – British Keramik: British Ceramics.2000.DK, Keramikmuseet Grimmerhus / Fine Art Productions, Denmark. ISBN 9788772458298
- 2000 – Cyril Frankel, Modern Pots: Hans Coper Lucie Rie and their Contemporaries, The Lisa Sainsbury Collection, Thames & Hudson. ISBN 0946009368
- 2000 – Contemporary Ceramics, Thames & Hudson and Calman/King.
- 1999 – Jane Adlin, Contemporary Ceramics: Selections from The Metropolitan Museum of Art, The Metropolitan Museum of Art, New York. ISBN 0300200617
- 1999 – Edmund de Waal, Design Sourcebook: Ceramics, New Holland. ISBN 1859740774
- 1999 – Josie Warshaw and Richard Phethean, The Complete Practical Potter, Anness Publishing Ltd. ISBN 1844774538
- 1999 – 25 Years Crafts Council Shop at the V&A, Crafts Council.
- 1999 – Current Context, New Ways of Seeing, Royal Museum, Edinburgh.
- 1999 – Peter Schmitt, Frauen in Europa, Keramikerinnen aus 15 europäisches Ländern, Bayerisher Kunstgewerbe-verein, Munich and Galerie Marianne Heller.
- 1999 – Eric Yates-Owen, Richard Fournier, British Studio Potters Marks, A&C Black, London. ISBN 1408183501
