= Symphony No. 54 (Haydn) =

1774 symphony by Joseph Haydn

Joseph Haydn

The Symphony No. 54 in G major, Hoboken I/54, is a symphony by Joseph Haydn, composed in 1774.

== Instrumentation ==
The symphony exists in 3 versions. The first version is scored for two oboes, bassoon, two horns, and strings. Subsequently, the second version included a second bassoon part and a timpani part. H.C. Robbins Landon has speculated that Haydn added flute and trumpet parts for a third version performed in London. The full ensemble thus can consist of two flutes, two oboes, two bassoons, two horns, two trumpets, timpani, and strings equalled only in scope by the late set of London Symphonies.

== Movements ==
The symphony is in four movements:

1. Adagio maestoso – Presto
2. Adagio assai
3. Menuet and trio: Allegretto
4. Finale: Presto

Following a slow introduction, the opening theme of the first movement is stated in octaves by the first horn and the bassoon against a string accompaniment. It is the string accompaniment which is worked in the development. The movement is also notable for its advances in orchestration because of the independence of the bassoon from the other bass parts and other sectional specializations, such as the use of winds to sustain harmonies while the strings expand on the melodies.

The slow movement is one of Haydn's most memorable. The movement is in sonata form and opens with a section marked messa di voce and builds up to a cadenza cadence which is followed by a cadenza for solo violin. In the recapitulation, the build-up to the cadenza is intensified and the cadenza is lengthened and expanded to two solo violins.

== Sources ==
- Robbins Landon, H. C. (1963) Joseph Haydn: Critical Edition of the Complete Symphonies, Universal Edition, Vienna.
