= Joe Edwards (painter) =

Scottish painter (1933–2000)

Joseph B. Edwards (1933–2000) was a Scottish painter.

Edwards trained at Gray's School of Art, in Aberdeen, from 1950 to 1954, under Robert Sivell, then head of the school. After completing National Service he married Betty, who had also studied at Gray's, and moved to Home Farm, Kingswells, just outside Aberdeen.

He regularly exhibited his work at the Royal Scottish Academy throughout the 1950s and 1960s. He worked in both oils and tempera.

His work was inspired by his rural surroundings, and he was concerned with representing the human aspect of farming life. His love of the turn of seasons and the ever changing rural landscape is clear in his work. The rhythmic nature of the paintings evoke the cycle of nature itself. Some of his larger works depicting agricultural themes, can be seen at National Museum of Rural Life, Kittochside, East Kilbride. If the paintings are not on exhibition you can request to view them in the store.

He was also an accomplished portrait painter and was latterly working on a large painting of a group of Aberdeen Artists - unfortunately this work was not completed.

Edwards has over 40 paintings in public art collections, particularly the National Museum of Rural Life (Scotland) and Aberdeenshire Museums Service.
