= Marion Patterson =

Scottish fire warden during the Second World War (1911-1993)

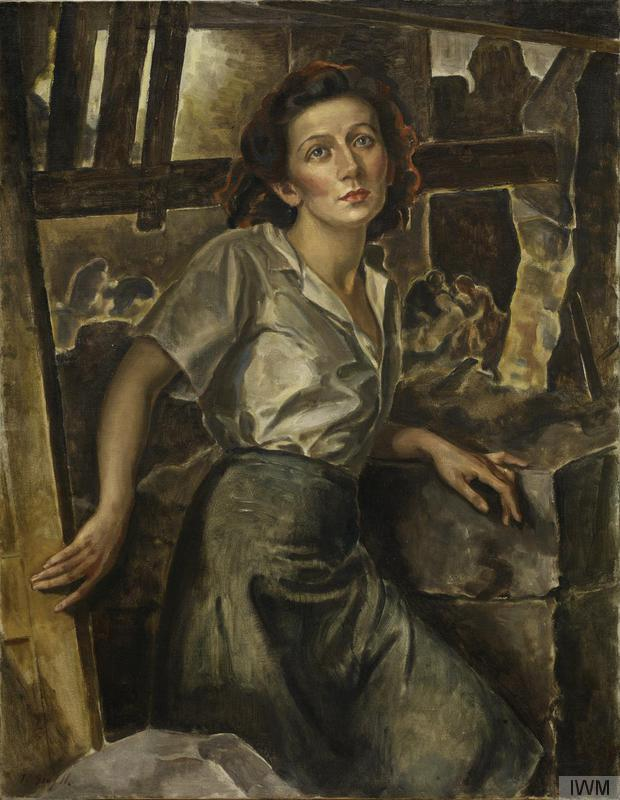
- Portrait of Patterson by Robert Sivell
- Born: Marion Chalmers; 26 August 1911; Aberdeen, Scotland
- Died: 14 August 1993 (aged 81); Toronto, Ontario
- Occupation: Fire warden
- Years active: 1942-1944
- Known for: George Medal recipient

Marion Patterson GM (nee Chalmers; 1911–1993) was a Scottish fire warden during World War II. She was awarded the George Medal for helping to save sailors trapped in the rubble of a bombed building. Her medal was presented by King George VI at Buckingham Palace.

== Life ==
Marion Chalmers was born in Aberdeen, Scotland, on 26 August 1911. From 1919 to 1939 she lived in Toronto, Ontario, Canada. In August 1939, she, her husband (Guthrie Armour Patterson, born 29 January 1904 in Dundee, Scotland) and son (Douglas Patterson, born 8 October 1932 in Toronto), moved back to Aberdeen.

After the Second World War broke out Patterson enlisted as an Ambulance Driver. In October 1942, she became a Senior Fire Guard for the Civil Defence Service in Aberdeen.

She died on 14 August 1993 in Toronto

== Recognition for bravery ==
On 7 August 1942, while on duty, Patterson was helping to extinguish a burning building when she heard cries for help coming from under some walls that had collapsed. She managed to get to the sailor who was trapped below and free him. He was too weak to help. A rope was lowered through the damaged walls and she was able to tie the rope around the sailor’s waist and with help got him out of the burning building. The building collapsed less than a minute later.

On 4 December 1942, after the incident was written up in the London Gazette, she received an invitation to attend Buckingham Palace on 12 February 1943 to receive a presentation of the George Medal by King George VI. Patterson was the first street fire-guard to win a medal while engaged in fire duties. As part of the award, she was also selected for portraiture in a special section of the National Gallery of England set aside for heroes and heroines of the Blitz. Patterson was also invited to be a guest at Balmoral Castle for the remainder of her life.

The Scottish artist Robert Sivell was commissioned by King George VI to paint Patterson’s portrait. Patterson attended Buckingham Place again for the presentation of the portrait. The original was hung in the National Gallery, London and was displayed in a special wing for Heroes and Heroines of the 1939-1945 War.

Patterson also received two replicas of the portrait and a sketch in black and white. One replica is in the Ottawa Canadian War Museum and was on display as part of the Women At War exhibit at the museum in 1985. Patterson’s medals and the sketch are now kept in Aberdeen Art Gallery.
