= William Schuman =

American composer and arts administrator (1910-1992)

William Schuman

William Howard Schuman (August 4, 1910 – February 15, 1992) was an American composer and arts administrator.

== Life ==
Schuman was born into a Jewish family in Manhattan, New York City, son of Samuel and Rachel Schuman. He was named after the 27th U.S. president, William Howard Taft, though his family preferred to call him Bill. Schuman played the violin and banjo as a child, but his overwhelming passion was baseball. He attended Temple Shaaray Tefila as a child. While still in high school, he formed a dance band, "Billy Schuman and his Alamo Society Orchestra", that played local weddings and bar mitzvahs in which Schuman played string bass.

In 1928 he entered New York University's School of Commerce to pursue a business degree, at the same time working for an advertising agency. He also wrote popular songs with E. B. Marks Jr, a friend he had met long before at summer camp. Around that time, Schuman met lyricist Frank Loesser and wrote some forty songs with him. Loesser's first published song, "In Love with a Memory of You", credits the music to William H. Schuman.

On April 13, 1930, Schuman attended a Carnegie Hall concert of the New York Philharmonic, conducted by Arturo Toscanini. According to the Philharmonic's archives, the program included works by Brahms, Mendelssohn, Castelnuovo-Tedesco and Smetana. Of this experience, Schuman later said, "I was astounded at seeing the sea of stringed instruments, and everybody bowing together. The visual thing alone was astonishing. But the sound! I was overwhelmed. I had never heard anything like it. The very next day, I decided to become a composer."

Schuman dropped out of school and quit his part-time job to study music at the Malkin Conservatory with Max Persin and Charles Haubiel. From 1933 to 1938, he studied privately with Roy Harris. In 1935, he received a M.A. degree in music education from Teachers College at Columbia University. Harris brought Schuman to the attention of the conductor Serge Koussevitzky, who championed many of his works and conducted Schuman's Symphony No. 2 in 1939. Possibly Schuman's best known symphony, the Symphony for Strings, was commissioned by the Koussevitzky Foundation, dedicated to the memory of Natalie Koussevitzky, and was first performed under Koussevitzky on November 12, 1943.

Schuman won the inaugural Pulitzer Prize for Music in 1943 for his Cantata No. 2. A Free Song, adapted from poems by Walt Whitman. From 1935 to 1945, he taught composition at Sarah Lawrence College. In 1945, he became president of the Juilliard School, founding the Juilliard String Quartet while there. He left in 1961 to succeed John D. Rockefeller III as president of Lincoln Center, a position he held until 1969. In 1971, Schuman was awarded The Edward MacDowell Medal by The MacDowell Colony for outstanding contributions to American culture. He won a special Pulitzer Prize in 1985 citing "more than half a century of contribution to American music as composer and educational leader" and he received the National Medal of Arts in 1987.

He died at Lenox Hill Hospital in New York City at age 81, following hip surgery. Schuman was survived by his wife Frances (they married in 1936); two children, Anthony William and Andrea Frances; and one grandchild.

== Music ==
Schuman left a substantial body of work. His "eight symphonies, numbered Three through Ten", as he himself put it (the first two were withdrawn), continue to grow in stature. His concerto for violin (1947, rev. 1959) has been hailed as among his "most powerful works ... it could almost be considered a symphony for violin and orchestra." Other works include the New England Triptych (1956, based on melodies by William Billings), the American Festival Overture (1939), the ballets Undertow (1945) and Judith (1949) (the latter written for Martha Graham), the Mail Order Madrigals (1972) to texts from the 1897 Sears Roebuck catalog, and two operas, The Mighty Casey (1953, based on Ernest Thayer's "Casey at the Bat"), which reflected his lifelong love of baseball, and A Question of Taste (1989, after a short story by Roald Dahl). He also arranged Charles Ives' organ piece Variations on "America" for orchestra in 1963, in which version it is better known. Another popular work by William Schuman is his George Washington Bridge (1950), for concert band.

== Television appearance ==
William Schuman appeared as the opening guest on the CBS game show, What's My Line? on September 30, 1962 (episode No. 632). Because of his recognizability, panel members Dorothy Kilgallen, Martin Gabel, Arlene Francis and Bennett Cerf were blindfolded. Schuman's title card identified him as "Composer and President of Lincoln Center for the Performing Arts (New York City)". Schuman displayed his wit in response to panel questions. After the panel exhausted a few categories, Kilgallen asked, "How about music?" Schuman replied, "How about it, what's the question?" When asked if he was Leonard Bernstein, Schuman replied, "I'm his friend." When asked if he was Rudolf Bing, Schuman repeated, "I'm his friend", prompting Francis to wonder who was not his friend. When asked if he had ever sung for the Metropolitan Opera, Schuman said, "Often desired to, never invited." Cerf identified him after host John Charles Daly had flipped over all the cards. Daly announced that Schuman's Eighth Symphony would be performed at Philharmonic Hall (now David Geffen Hall) the following Thursday, which date, October 4, 1962, marked the première of the work. It was recorded for Columbia Masterworks Records five days later by its performers, the New York Philharmonic conducted by Bernstein.

== List of works ==
=== Opera ===
- The Mighty Casey (1953, based on Ernest Thayer's "Casey at the Bat")
- A Question of Taste (1989, after a short story by Roald Dahl)

=== Ballet ===
- Undertow (1945, written for Antony Tudor)
- Night Journey (1947, written for Martha Graham)
- Judith (1949, written for Martha Graham)
- Voyage for a Theatre (1953, written for Martha Graham; withdrawn)
- The Witch of Endor (1965, written for Martha Graham; withdrawn)

=== Orchestral ===
- Symphonies
  - Symphony No. 1 (1935; withdrawn)
  - Symphony No. 2 (1937; withdrawn)
  - Symphony No. 3 (1941)
  - Symphony No. 4 (1941)
  - Symphony for Strings (Symphony no. 5) (1943)
  - Symphony No. 6 (1948)
  - Symphony No. 7 (1960)
  - Symphony No. 8 (1962)
  - Symphony No. 9 Le fosse Ardeatine (1968) [viz. Ardeatine massacre]
  - Symphony No. 10 American Muse (1976)
- Potpourri (1932; withdrawn)
- Prelude and Fugue (1935; withdrawn)
- American Festival Overture (1939)
- Prayer in Time of War, originally titled Prayer 1943 (1943)
- Circus Overture (1944)
- Credendum (1955, commissioned by UNESCO)
- New England Triptych (1956, based on melodies by William Billings)
- The Orchestra Song (1963)
- In Praise of Shahn (1969)
- Amaryllis, Variants for Strings on an Old English Round (1976)
- American Hymn (1980)
- Showcase: A Short Display for Orchestra (1986)
- Let's Hear It For Lenny! (1988, written for the 70th Birthday of Leonard Bernstein)

=== Concertante ===
- Piano Concerto (1938; published but withdrawn)
- Piano Concerto (1942; third movement contains material from 1938 concerto)
- Violin Concerto (1947; 1st rev., 1954; 2nd rev. 1957–8)
- A Song of Orpheus, for cello and orchestra (1961)
- To Thee Old Cause, for oboe and orchestra (1968)
- Concerto on Old English Rounds, for viola, female chorus and orchestra (1973)
- Three Colloquies, for horn and orchestra (1979)

=== Vocal/Choral ===
- God's World (1932)
- Canons (1933)
- Prelude for Voices (1939, to texts by Thomas Wolfe)
- This Is Our Time (Secular Cantata no.1) (1939, to texts by Genevieve Taggard)
- Holiday Song (1942, to a text by Genevieve Taggard)
- A Free Song (Secular Cantata no.2) (1942, to texts by Walt Whitman)
- Four Canonic Choruses (1942, to texts by Edna St. Vincent Millay, Countee Cullen, Carl Sandburg and Alfred Tennyson)
- Te Deum (1943)
- Orpheus with His Lute (1944, to a text by William Shakespeare)
- Five Rounds on Famous Words (1956/69)
- Carols of Death (1958, to texts by Walt Whitman)
- Mail Order Madrigals (1972, to texts from the 1897 Sears Roebuck catalog)
- The Young Dead Soldiers (1975, to a text by Archibald MacLeish)
- Casey at the Bat (cantata; rev. of the opera The Mighty Casey)
- Time to the Old (1980, to texts by Archibald MacLeish)
- Perceptions (1982, to texts by Walt Whitman)
- Esses (1982)
- On Freedom's Ground (1985, to texts by Richard Wilbur)

=== Chamber/Instrumental ===
- String Quartet No. 1 (1935; withdrawn)
- String Quartet No. 2 (1937)
- String Quartet No. 3 (1939)
- Canon and Fugue for violin, cello and piano (1934; withdrawn)
- Pastorale 1 for alto and clarinet (1934; withdrawn)
- Pastorale 2 for flute, oboe and clarinet (1934; withdrawn)
- Choreographic Poem for 7 instruments (1934; withdrawn)
- Quartettino for Four Bassoons (1939)
- Three Score Set for piano (1943)
- String Quartet No. 4 (1950)
- Voyage: a cycle of 5 pieces for piano (1953)
- Three Piano Moods (1958)
- Amaryllis: Variations for string trio (1964)
- In Sweet Music, Serenade on a setting of Shakespeare for flute, viola, voice and harp (1978)
- XXV Opera Snatches for trumpet (1978)
- American Hymn, for brass quintet (1980)
- Dances, for wind quintet and percussion (1985)
- Awake, Thou Wintry Earth for clarinet and violin (1987)
- Fanfare "Cooperstown" for two trumpets and two trombones (1987)
- String Quartet No. 5 (1987)
- Chester: Variations for piano (1988)

=== Band ===
- Newsreel, in Five Shots (1941)
- George Washington Bridge (1950)
- Chester Overture (1956) extended version of the original orchestral movement from New England Triptych
- When Jesus Wept (1958) from New England Triptych
- Philharmonic Fanfare (1965; withdrawn)
- Dedication Fanfare (1968)
- Anniversary Fanfare (1969), commissioned for the Metropolitan Museum of Art Centennial to accompany the exhibition "19th Century America"
- Be Glad Then, America (1975) from New England Triptych

=== Arrangements ===
- Circus Overture, for band, arr. Don Owen (originally for orchestra—1944)
- Variations on "America", for orchestra (1963, arranged from Ives's organ piece with the same name)

=== Film scores ===
- Steel Town (1944), film by the Office of War Information
- The Earth Is Born (1957), film for Transfilm, Inc., and Time-Life Pictures
