= Mary Pirie =

Scottish botanist and teacher

- Born: 20 January 1822; Cotton Lodge, Woodside, Aberdeen
- Died: 8 February 1885 (aged 64); Portsoy, Aberdeenshire, Scotland
- Burial place: St Nicholas Cemetery, Aberdeen
- Occupations: Botanist; Entomologist; Teacher
- Notable work: "Flowers, Grasses and Shrubs with Anecdotes and Poetical Illustrations"(1860); "Familiar Teachings on Natural History: A Book for the Use of Schools and Families" (1864)
- Parents: William Pirie (father); Clementina Anderson (mother)

Mary Pirie (20 January 1822 – 8 February 1885) was a Scottish botanist and teacher. She had an interest in education and studied botany and entomology, calling entomology the study of "animated nature" which is the key focus of her second work. She believed one of the great benefits of natural sciences was the way that it is accessible to the masses, stating "The Science of Botany is the branch of Natural History most generally accessible to all; it is the science which furnishes us with the key to unlock the cabinet and unfold the wonders of the Floral Kingdom". This was cited as a key reason for her writing about botany in a digestible way through poetry and illustrations.

== Biography ==
Pirie was born in 1822 in Cotton Lodge, Woodside, Aberdeen, which is now Primrosehill Drive and gardens. Her parents were Clementina Anderson and William Pirie, who was a carpet manufacturer. She was one of ten children. In 1840, the family moved to Portsoy, where Pirie spent the next 45 years of her life and where she in 1885, aged 64.

Prior to her death, Pirie was passionate about educating others on her field of study. She also mentions her belief that "the regular operations of nature are a convincing proof that all things are made by divine hand". In later life, after publishing her books Pirie remained unmarried and lived with her servant Christina Ogilvie as of the 1881 England, Wales, and Scotland Census.

== Career ==
Pirie was a botanist who wanted to inspire that love in others, both her works are aimed at encouraging people from all walks of life to be interested in nature. This concern with science, and botany in particular, to be a public pursuit meant that she wrote a regular column about nature in The Banffshire Reporter where she wrote weekly notes on natural history and botany. Later in her career, her focus became that of educating others and encouraging others to pursue botany through her works.

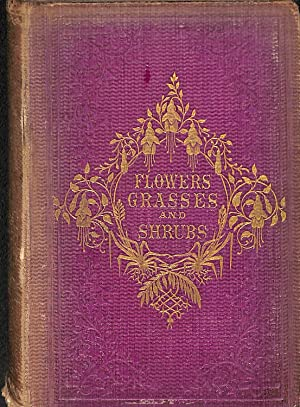
"a beautiful book for a present"

Pirie's 1860 popular botanical work was described as "a beautiful book for a present". It includes her own poetry and illustrations. One example of Pirie's style is in the details of the romantic story told about the mignonette, reseda odorata and how it became part of the Count Walsheim of Saxony's coat of arms. Pirie's 1864 work was dedicated to Viscount Reidhaven and in the preface she states that it is designed to "encourage and aid youth in the study of animated nature". Her first book was published by James Blackwood & Co; the second by Lewis Smith.

In life Pirie's first book was added to The Banff Literary Society's selection of periodicals in March 1862 showing how well her books were received in the local area at the time. Nowadays, Pirie's books are available across the world with 7 copies of 'Flowers, Grasses and Shrubs with Anecdotes and Poetical Illustrations' in North America and 3 copies in the United Kingdom according to OCLC records; including one in Pirie's native Scotland in the National Library of Scotland in Edinburgh.

In later life she lived in Portsoy, where she ran a private school, on Old Cullen Street. The success of this school led directly to the establishment of Durn Road School, however, due to ill-health she was unable to teach there. The Durn Road School ran for years after Pirie's death until it eventually shut in 1908. She died in Portsoy on 8 February 1885. Her remains were interred in St Nicholas Cemetery in Aberdeen. Her obituary described her as a "highly educated", as well as being active in the Dorcas Society of Portsoy and a member of St John the Baptist Episcopal Church Portsoy. She was the last remaining member of her family.

=== Books ===
- 1860 - Flowers, Grasses and Shrubs with Anecdotes and Poetical Illustrations.
- 1864 - Familiar Teachings on Natural History: A Book for the Use of Schools and Families
