= Friedrich August Kanne =

Friedrich August Kanne (1778–1833) was a composer and music critic in Vienna.

== Biography ==
Kanne was born on 8 March 1778 in Delitzsch, Saxony. He studied theology and medicine in Leipzig and Wittenberg, then literature and composition in Dresden. At the end of 1804, he moved to Vienna and worked briefly as a music tutor to Joseph Franz von Lobkowitz of the House of Lobkowicz. He met Joseph Haydn and became a friend of Beethoven whom he assisted to understand the text of the Tridentine Mass when Beethoven worked on his Missa solemnis. He lived for a while in the inn Zum Schwarzen Kameel (The Black Camel) in Vienna's Innere Stadt.

From 1820 until 1824 he edited the Vienna Allgemeine musikalische Zeitung (general musical newspaper) (Note: not to be confused with the better known Allgemeine musikalische Zeitung in Leipzig) following Ignaz and Joseph von Seyfried. In 1829 he edited with Ignaz Franz Castelli the Vienna Allgemeine musikalische Anzeiger (general music bulletin).

Kanne wrote more than a dozen operas and works of incidental music to plays, including La fedeltà (1803), Sappho (1805), Die Elfenköningin (1805), Orpheus und Eurydice (1807), Fernando und Miranda (1808), Mirandola oder Das Schwert der Rache (1811), Die Belagerten (1813), Deutscher Sinn (1813), Die gute Nachricht (1814), Das Schloß Theben oder Der Kampf der Flußgötter (1817), Die eiserne Jungfrau (1822), Malvina oder Putzerls Abenteuer (1823), Lindane oder Die Fee und der Haarbeutelschneider (1824), Die Zauberschminke oder das Land der Erfindungen (1825), Der Untergang des Feenreiches (1826), Philipp und Suschen oder Der falsche Jupiter (1832), Die Mainacht oder Der Blocksberg (Berlin, 1834), partly to his own libretto. His patriotic play to which he also wrote incidental music, "Die Spinnerin am Kreuz" (1822), was for many years in repertory on Vienna stages. It has been suggested that the slow movement of Beethoven's Piano Concerto No. 4 is a piece of program music closely based on the finale of act 1 of Kanne's Orpheus. Beethoven used a text by Kanne for his aria with chorus, "Germania", WoO 94. Kanne's further works include some symphonies, masses, piano works, and songs written to poems by Goethe, Schiller and Schlegel.

Kanne died on 16 December 1833 in Vienna and is buried in St. Marx Cemetery there.

== Legacy ==
In 1912, the lane Kannegasse in Vienna's Rudolfsheim-Fünfhaus was named after him. There is speculation that Kanne became the prototype of Kapellmeister Johannes Kreisler in E. T. A. Hoffmann's works.
