= Andrew Tait (organist) =

Andrew Tait (c. 1710 – June 11, 1778) was a Scottish organist, church musician, and music educator. He also composed the psalm tune "Aberdeen, or St Paul’s".

== Biography ==
Andrew Tait was born in Aberdeen, Scotland in c. 1710. He was prominent musical figure in his native city during the 18th century; notably co-founding the Aberdeen Musical Society in 1748. From 1735 to 1775 he was organist at St. Paul's Episcopal Chapel, Aberdeen. Musician Charles Macklean was responsible for Tait's appointment to post of 'Master of the Song School' in Aberdeen in 1740. He led that school until its closure in 1755; teaching classes not only in singing but also in the playing of the spinet, harpsichord, flute, and violin.

With the inventor and printer James Chalmers, he collaborated on A New and Correct Set of Church Tunes (1749, Aberdeen). It was dedicated to the Provost of Aberdeen, the Baillies, and Aberdeen town council, and was the first publication of the music of St. Paul's Episcopal Chapel. Tait also authored a manual on choir training. He composed the psalm tune "Aberdeen, or St Paul’s" which was later published as no. 561 in The English Hymnal (1933). By 1750 he was a frequent guest in the home of the Sir Archibald Grant, 2nd Baronet; serving as the Grant family's musical advisor and often joining them in family concerts. Samuel Johnson praised Tait's skills as an organist during his visit to Scotland in the 1770s.

Tait died in Aberdeen on June 11, 1778. Robert Barber succeeded him as organist at St. Paul's followed by John Ross.
