= Africa (hymn tune) =

Hymn tune by William Billings

"Africa" is an 18th-century hymn tune by American choral composer William Billings, who worked in New England.

== History ==
Billings wrote "Africa" some time before 1770 and included it in his first published hymnbook, The New England Psalm Singer. Later he revised it, publishing a new version in his The Singing Master's Assistant (1778). He made additional revisions, publishing it again in Music in Miniature (1779). It is the latter two versions that are performed today.

The name of the hymn is, as far as can be determined, completely arbitrary, and reflects a practice of Billings's day to give names specifically to the tunes of songs. Billings also wrote an "Asia" and an "America"; more often, he adopted the names of (arbitrarily chosen) New England towns to label his tunes.

== Music ==
Version of 1778.

"Africa"
Piano reduction

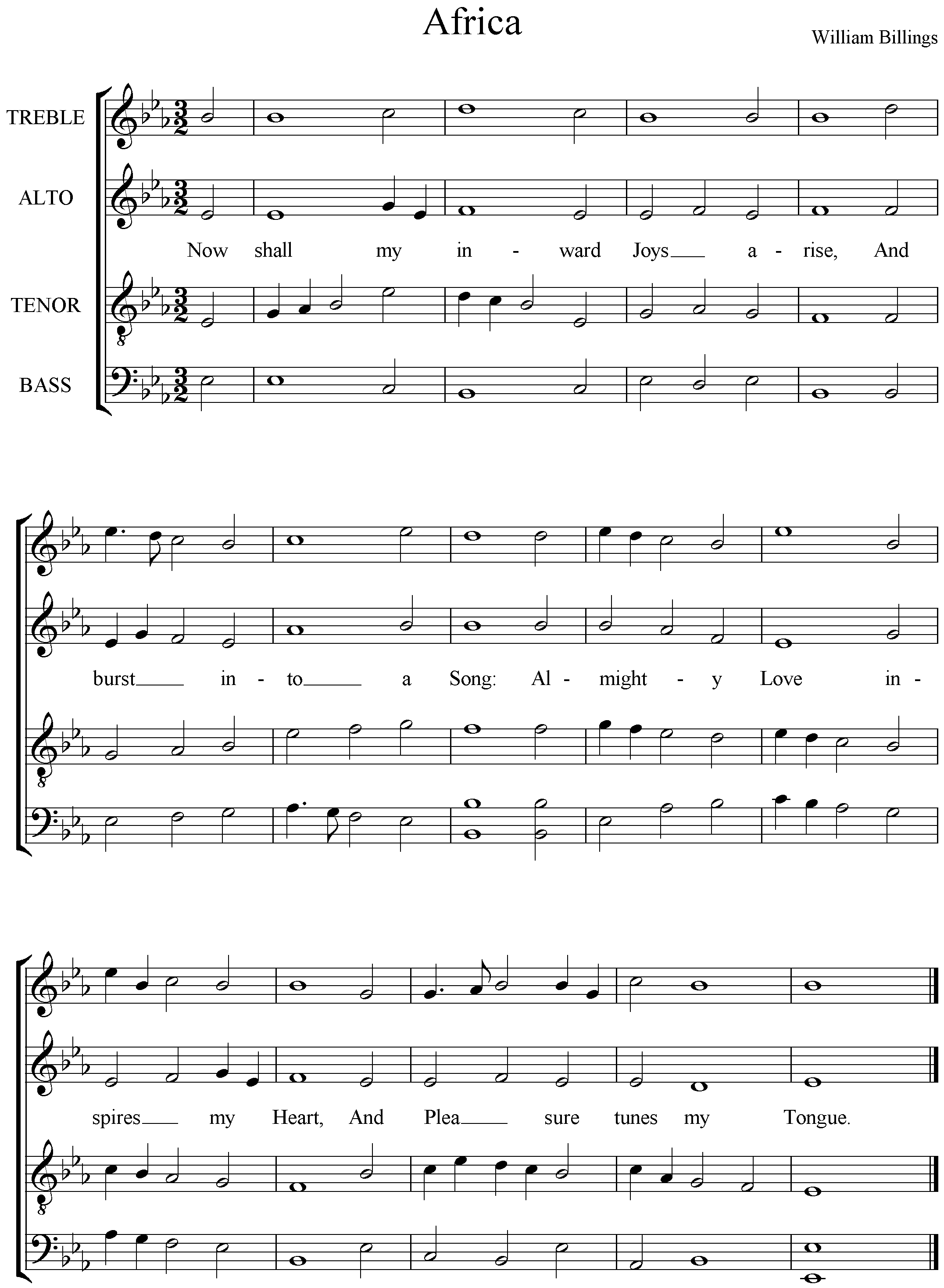

Musically, the work is notable for the parallel descending thirds and sixths that shift from part to part. Some renditions of this hymn (for example, the practice of Sacred Harp singer) follow a practice recommended by Billings, with some male singers on the treble, singing an octave down, and some female singers on the tenor part, singing an octave higher.

== Words ==
The 1770 version of "Africa" was published without lyrics. Since it readily fits any iambic quatrain written in couplets of eight and six syllables (common meter), singers of this version would certainly have had no trouble finding lyrics to accompany it. Such quatrains are common in hymn lyrics.

For the 1778 and 1779 versions, Billings chose lyrics: the first stanza of Hymn #39 of the first volume of hymns (1709) by the noted English hymnodist Isaac Watts.

Now shall my inward joys arise,
And burst into a Song;
Almighty Love inspires my Heart,
And Pleasure tunes my Tongue.

Billings altered Watts's "joys" to "joy", although this change is not always observed by singers. Sometimes the other stanzas by Watts are also sung to the tune of "Africa"; they are as follows:

God on his thirsty Sion-Hill
Some Mercy-Drops has thrown,
And solemn Oaths have bound his Love
To show'r Salvation down.

Why do we then indulge our Fears,
Suspicions and Complaints?
Is he a God, and shall his Grace
Grow weary of his saints?

Can a kind Woman e'er forget
The Infant of her Womb,
And 'mongst a thousand tender Thoughts
Her Suckling have no Room?

Yet, saith the Lord, should Nature change,
And Mothers Monsters prove,
Sion still dwells upon the Heart
Of everlasting Love.

Deep on the Palms of both my Hands
I have engrav'd her Name;
My Hands shal raise her ruin'd Walls,
And build her broken Frame.

== Reception ==
"Africa" is a favorite among Billings' works, and is performed frequently on concert programs and in recordings. It is one of several Billings' hymns included in the Sacred Harp musical tradition. It is widely sung in this context, although a comparatively recent addition to that book.

== Books ==
The hymnbooks in which Billings first published "Africa" are in print today, in scholarly editions edited by Hans Nathan and published by the University Press of Virginia:

- The New England Psalm Singer, ISBN 0-8139-0917-1
- The Singing Master's Assistant and Music in Miniature (in one volume), ISBN 0-8139-0839-6

Much of the information above is taken from these scholarly editions.
