= William Billings =

American choral composer

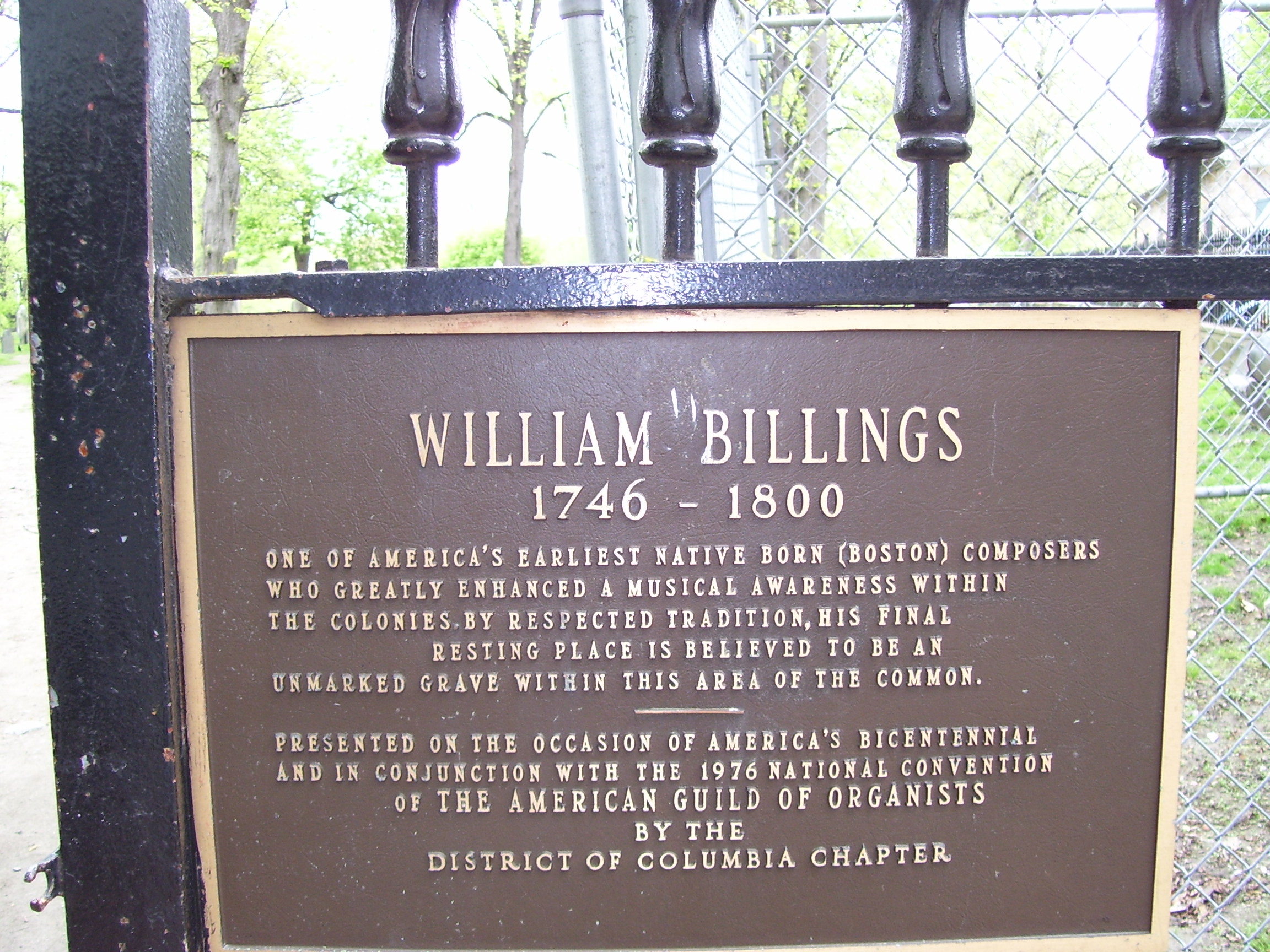
William Billings grave memorial at the Central Burying Ground on Boston Common

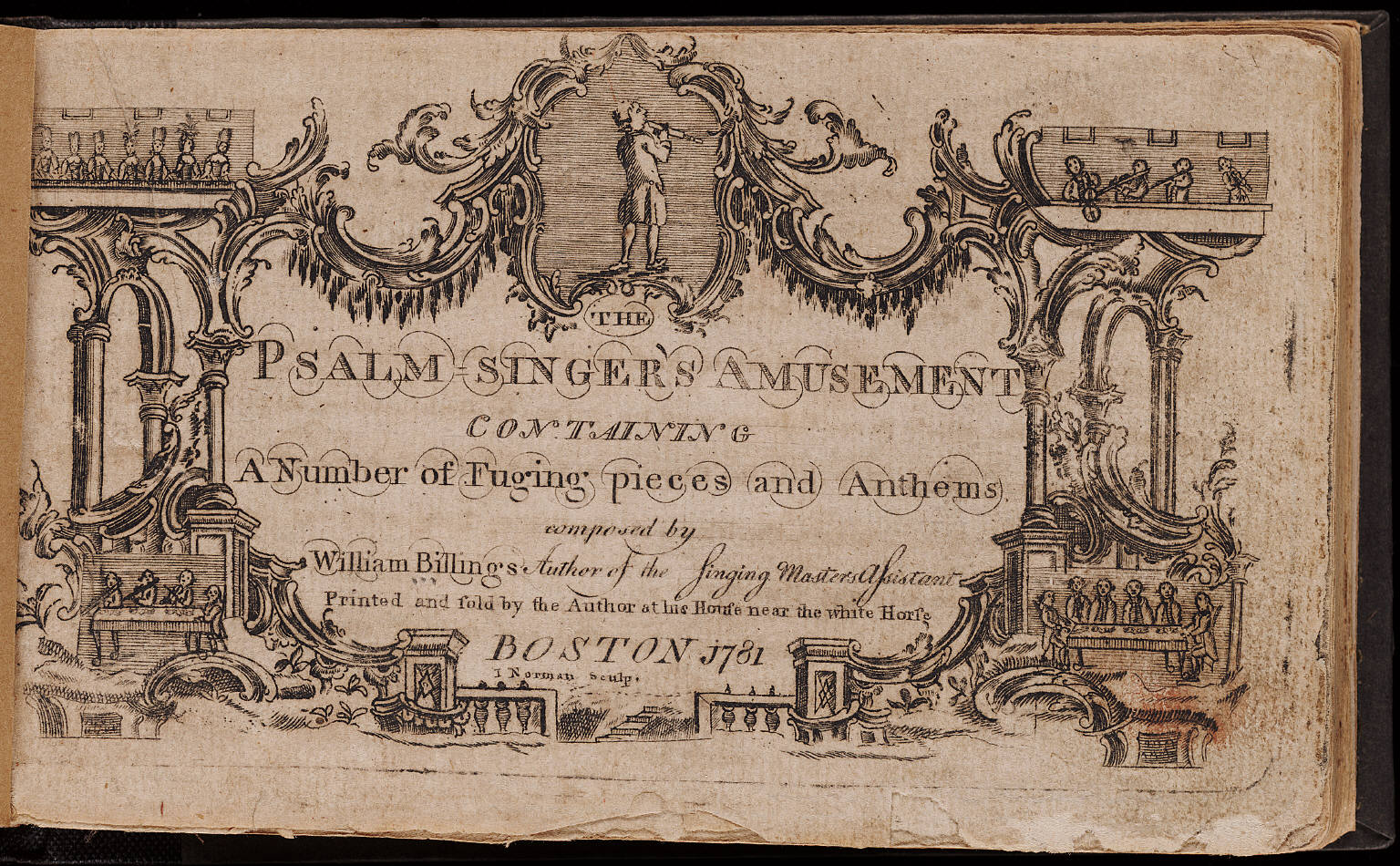
Psalm-Singer's Amusement by Billings, "printed and sold by the author at his house near the White Horse, Boston," 1781

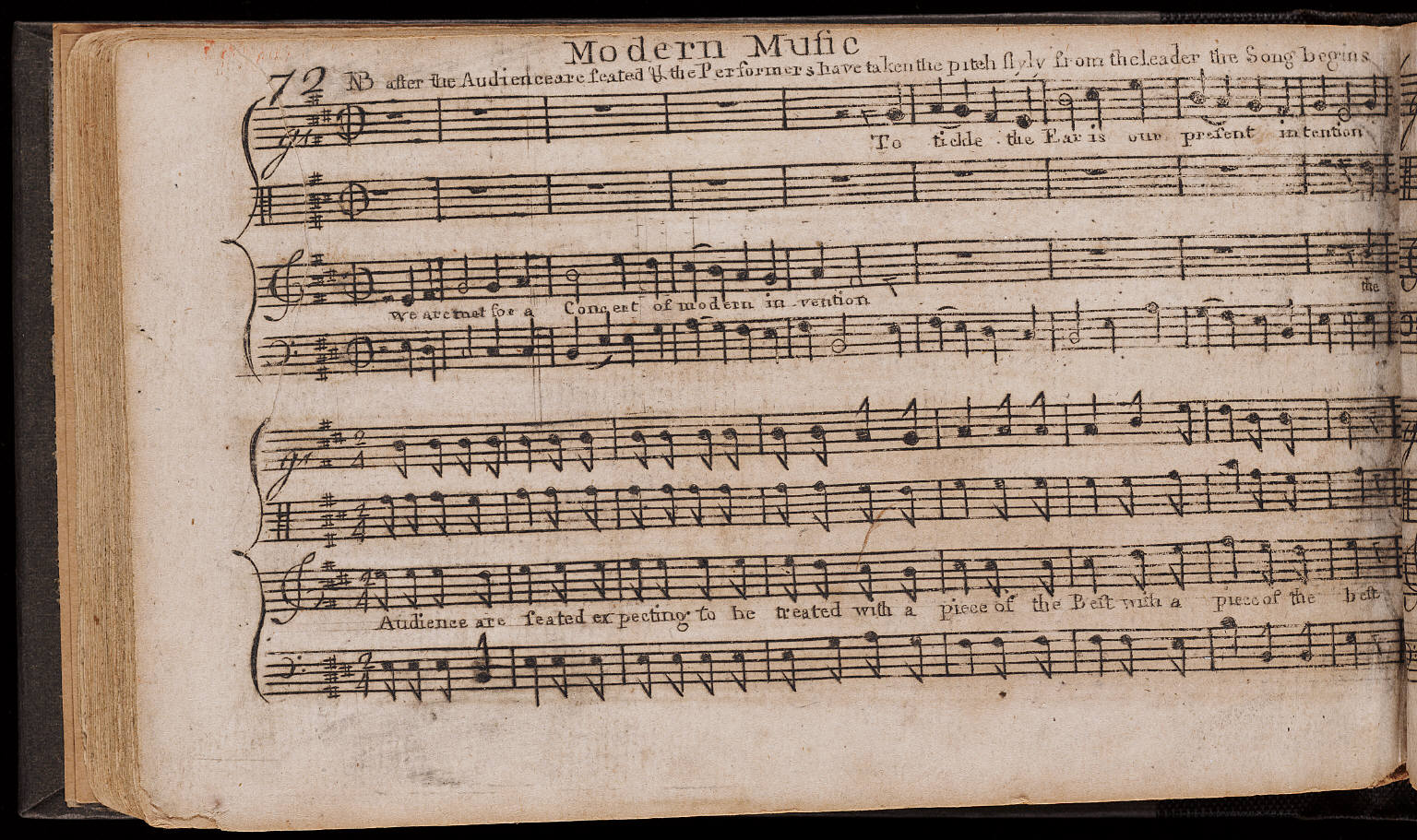
Psalm-Singer's Amusement by Billings, 1781

William Billings (October 7, 1746 – September 26, 1800) was an American composer and is regarded as the first American choral composer and leading member of the First New England School.

== Life ==
William Billings was born in Boston, Province of Massachusetts Bay. At the age of 14, the death of his father stopped Billings' formal schooling. In order to help support his family, young Billings trained as a tanner. He possibly received musical instruction from John Barry, one of the choir members at the New South Church, but for the most part he was self-taught. Billings had an unusual appearance and a strong addiction to snuff. His contemporary wrote that Billings "was a singular man, of moderate size, short of one leg, with one eye, without any address & with an uncommon negligence of person. Still, he spake & sung & thought as a man above the common abilities." Billings' wife died on March 26, 1795, leaving him with six children under the age of 18. He died in poverty in Boston on September 26, 1800. His funeral was announced in the Columbian Centinel: "Died- Mr. William Billings, the celebrated music composer. His funeral will be tomorrow at 4 o'clock, PM from the house of Mrs. Amos Penniman, in Chamber-street, West-Boston."

== Music ==
Virtually all of Billings' music was written for four-part chorus, singing a cappella. His many hymns and anthems were published mostly in book-length collections, as follows:

- The New-England Psalm-Singer (1770)
- The Singing Master's Assistant (1778)
- Music in Miniature (1779)
- The Psalm-Singer's Amusement (1781)
- The Suffolk Harmony (1786)
- The Continental Harmony (1794)

Sometimes Billings would revise and improve a song, including the new version in his next volume.

Billings' music can be at times forceful and stirring, as in his patriotic song "Chester"; ecstatic, as in his hymn "Africa"; or elaborate and celebratory, as in his "Easter Anthem" and "Rose of Sharon".

"Jargon," from Singing Master's Assistant, shows his wit. Written as an answer to a criticism of his use of harmony, "Jargon" contains a tongue-in-cheek text, and jarring dissonances that sound more like those of the 20th century than of the 18th. Billings followed up "Jargon" with his address "To the Goddess of Discord".

He also wrote several Christmas carols, including "Judea" in 1778 and "Shiloh" in 1781.

== Billings as a writer ==
=== Verse ===
Most of the texts that Billings used in his works come from the poetry of Isaac Watts. Other texts were drawn from Universalist poets and local poets, whereas Billings himself wrote the text to about a dozen of his compositions.

As an example, McKay & Crawford 2019, p. 83 compare Billings' metrical rendering of Luke 2:8–11 with that of Nahum Tate, thought to be the inspiration for Billings' work:

Tate:

While shepherds watched their flocks by night
All seated on the ground,
The angel of the Lord came down,
And glory shone around.

Billings:

As shepherds in Jewry were guarding their sheep,
Promiscusly seated estranged from sleep;
An Angel from heaven presented to view,
And thus he accosted the trembling few
Dispel all your sorrows, and banish your fears,
For Jesus our Saviour in Jewry appears.

=== Pedagogical writing ===
Billings wrote long prefaces to his works in which he explained (often in an eccentric prose style) the rudiments of music and how his work should be performed. His writings reflect his extensive experience as a singing master. They also provide information on choral performance practice in Billings's day; for instance, a passage from the preface to The Continental Harmony indicates that Billings liked to have both men and women sing the treble (top) and tenor lines, an octave apart:

... in general they are best sung together, viz. if a man sings it as a Medius, and a woman as a Treble, it is in effect as two parts; so likewise, if a man sing a Tenor with a masculine and woman with a feminine voice, the Tenor is as full as two parts, and a tune so sung (although it has but four parts) is in effect the same as six. Such a conjunction of masculine and feminine voices is beyond expression, sweet and ravishing, and is esteemed by all good judges to be vastly preferable to any instrument whatever, framed by human invention.

— Billings 2013

== Singing schools ==
Billings was involved in teaching singing schools throughout his life. In 1769, when Billings was twenty-three years old, the following announcement appeared in the Boston Gazette: "John Barrey & William Billings Begs Leave to inform the Publick, that they propose to open a Singing School THIS NIGHT ... where any Person inclining to learn to Sing may be attended upon at said School with Fidelity and Dispatch." He taught a singing school in Stoughton, Massachusetts in 1774 and all the pupils' names were listed. He was listed as "singing master" in the Boston city directory up until 1798. In the preface to the Singing Master's Assistant, Billings included advice for the practical running of a singing school, including topics such as logistics, expectations for manners and attentiveness in students, and the need for the supremacy of the teacher's musical decisions.

== Reception ==
Billings' work was very popular in its heyday, but his career was hampered by the primitive state of copyright law in America at the time. By the time the copyright laws had been strengthened, it was too late for Billings: the favorites among his tunes had already been widely reprinted in other people's hymnals, permanently copyright-free.

With changes in the public's musical taste, Billings' fortunes declined. His last tune-book, The Continental Harmony, was published as a project of his friends, in an effort to help support the revered but no longer popular composer. His temporary employment as a Boston street sweeper was probably a project of a similar nature.

Billings died in poverty at age 53, and for a considerable time after his death, his music was almost completely neglected in the American musical mainstream. However, his compositions remained popular for a time in the rural areas of New England, which resisted the newer trends in sacred music. Moreover, a few of Billings' songs were carried southward and westward through America, as a result of their appearance in shape note hymnals. They ultimately resided in the rural South, as part of the Sacred Harp singing tradition.

In the latter part of the twentieth century a Billings revival occurred, and a sumptuous complete scholarly edition of his works was published (see Books, below). Works by Billings are commonly sung by American choral groups today, particularly performers of early music. In addition, the recent spread of Sacred Harp music has acquainted many more people with Billings' music: several of his compositions are among the more frequently sung of the works in the Sacred Harp canon.

== Other ==
- The Stoughton Musical Society, formed by former students of Billings, has carried on his tradition for over 200 years, and included twenty-seven Billings tunes in their 1878 music collection, The Stoughton Musical Society's Centennial Collection of Sacred Music. Among the favorite tunes by Billings sung by this choral society are: "Majesty" and "Chester".
- The modern American composer William Schuman featured Billings' American Revolutionary War anthem "Chester", along with two other of Billings' hymns ("When Jesus Wept" and "Be Glad Then, America"), in his composition New England Triptych (1956).
- William Billings was inducted into the Songwriters Hall of Fame in 1970.
- American composer Roger Lee Hall had the premiere of his choral work in 1980 entitled "The Pleasures of Variety - Homage to William Billings."
- In 1996, modern dance choreographer Twyla Tharp premiered a piece entitled "Sweet Fields" using many hymns by Billings and other early American choral composers.
- American composer John Cage incorporated chance-derived fragmentations of many of Billings compositions in his works centered around the bicentennial celebration commissions that he received, including "Apartment House 1776", "44 Harmonies", and "Quartets I-VIII". Cage also employed the music of other Colonial-era composers in these works as well.

=== Billings's works ===
- Complete works of William Billings in four volumes, edited by Karl Kroeger and Hans Nathan:
- The New England psalm-singer. University of Virginia Press (1981).
- The Singing Masters Assistant, Music in Miniature. University of Virginia Press (1984). ISBN 0-8139-0839-6.
- The Psalm-Singer's Amusement. University of Virginia Press (1987). ISBN 0-8139-1130-3.
- The Continental Harmony. Harvard University Press. 2013. ISBN 978-0-674-18830-3.
