= Culture of Sydney =

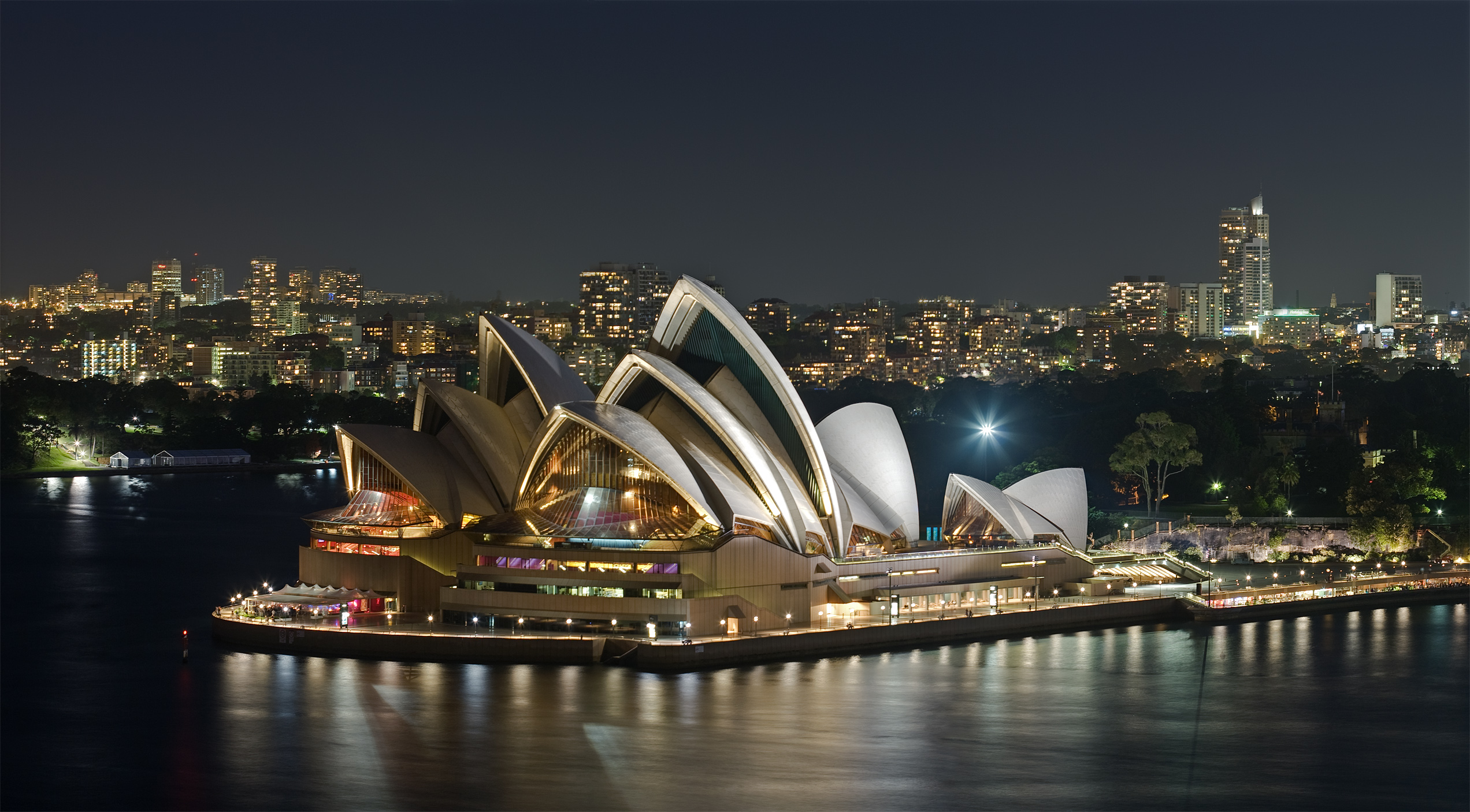
Sydney Opera House, one of the most visited concert halls in the world, illuminated at night

The cultural life of Sydney is dynamic and multicultural. Many of the individual cultures that make up the Sydney mosaic are centred on the cultural, artistic, ethnic, linguistic and religious communities formed by waves of immigration. Sydney is a major global city with a vibrant scene of musical, theatrical, visual, literary and other artistic activity.

== Arts and entertainment ==
=== Performing arts ===
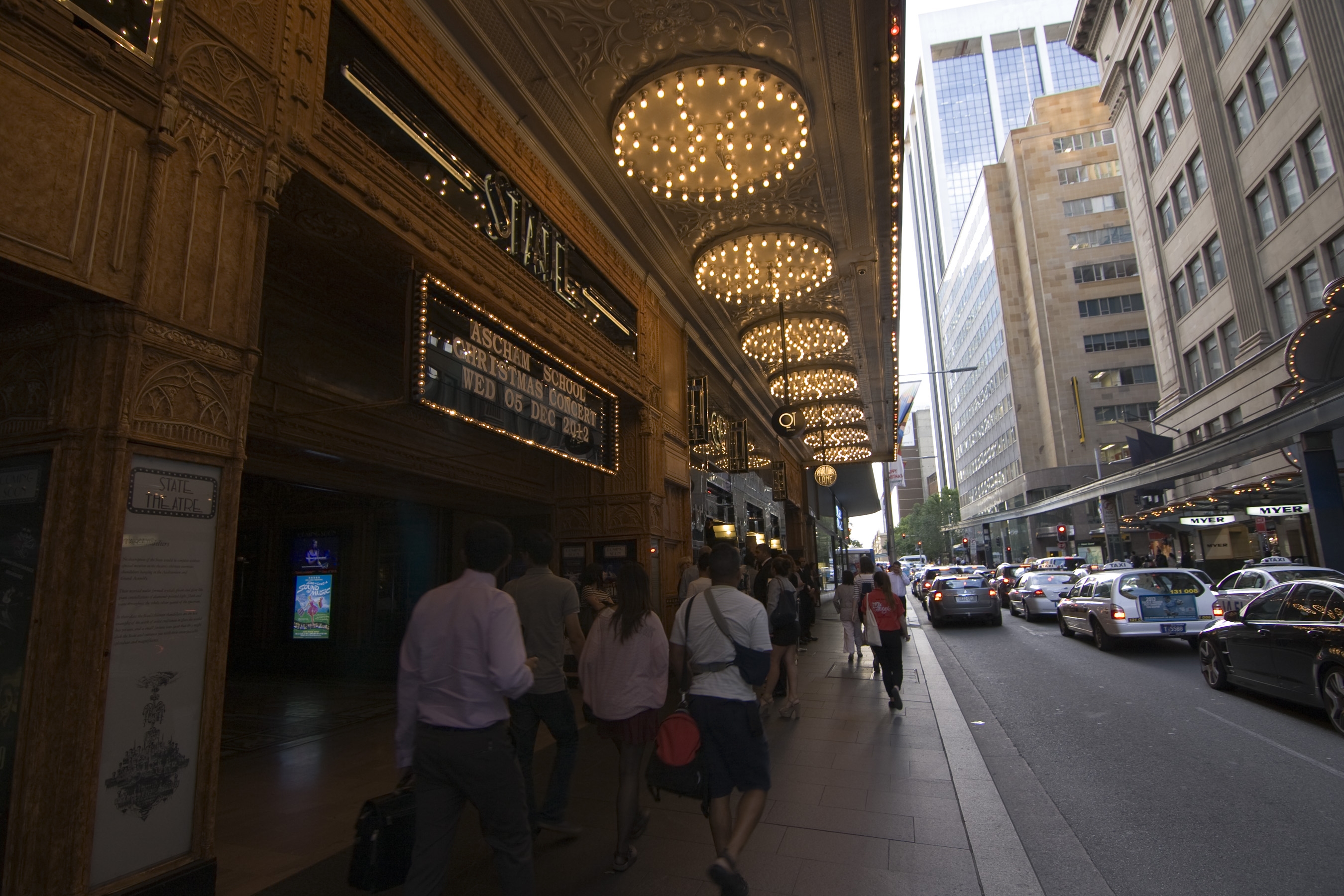
Art deco entrance to the State Theatre, Market Street

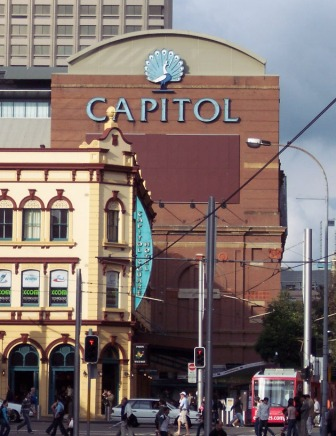
Capitol Theatre, Haymarket

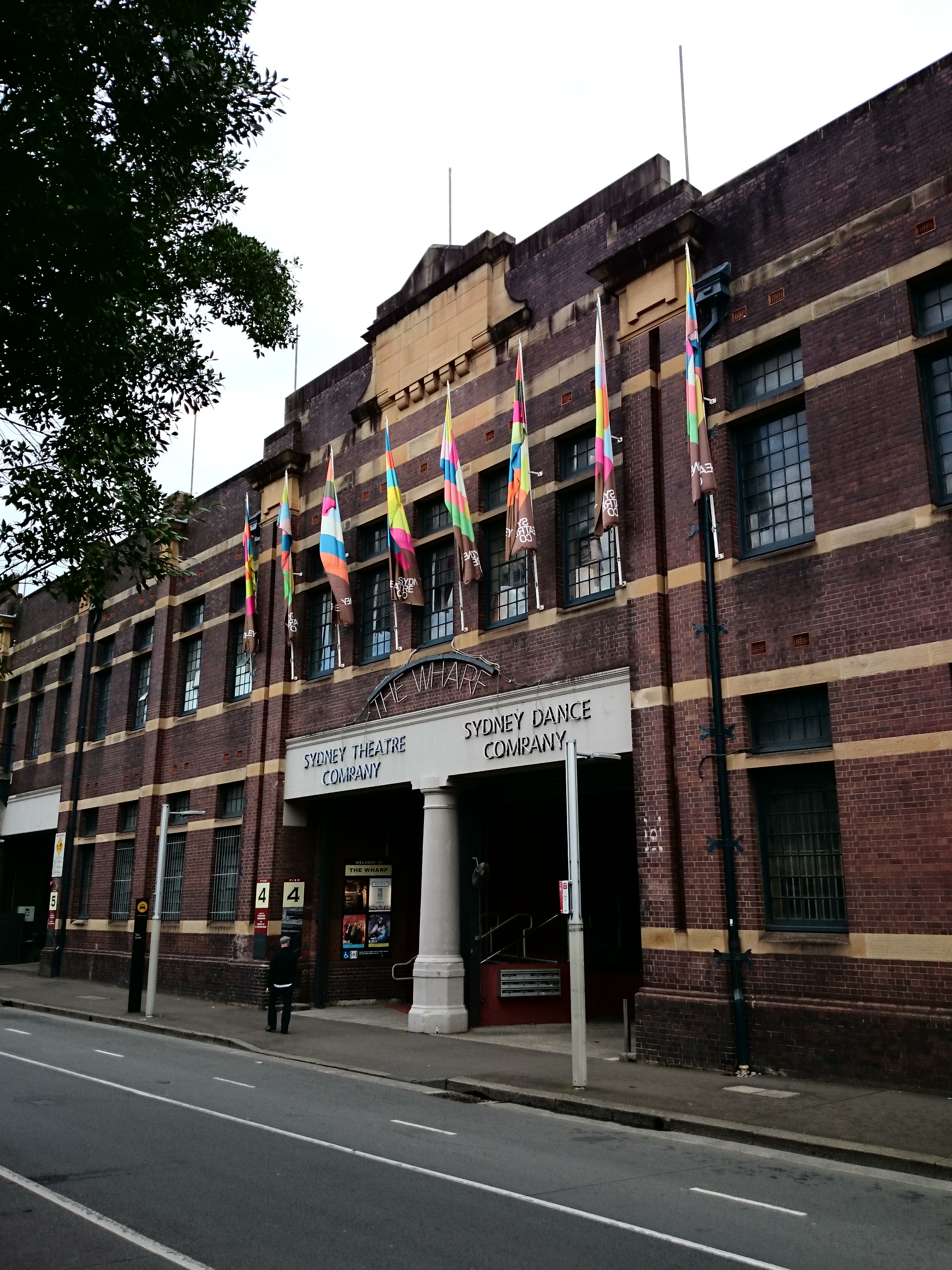
The Wharf Theatres in Pier 4/5 Dawes Point, host performances by numerous cultural groups including the Sydney Theatre Company and the Sydney Dance Company. 2014

The Sydney Festival, held each year in January, is Sydney's and Australia's biggest performing arts festival, incorporating classical and contemporary music, theatre, visual arts, and new media.

The Sydney Theatre Company shows a regular roster of Australian (by authors such as noted playwright David Williamson), classic, and international plays. Their productions occasionally incorporate the return to the live stage of famous Australian screen actors such as Cate Blanchett, Hugo Weaving, Geoffrey Rush, etc. The Wharf Theatre, the Sydney Theatre, the Drama Theatre of the Opera House and the Belvoir Street Theatre (the home of Company B) are some of the main live theatre venues. The Bell Shakespeare Company, directed by John Bell, specialises in Shakespearean drama, with forays into modern plays such as Heiner Müller's 'Titus Andronicus'.

Sydney has several independent theatres for productions throughout the city centre including the Capitol Theatre (est. 1928, 2,000 seats), the Lyric Theatre (2,000 seats), the Theatre Royal (Est. 1827, 1,200 seats) and the State Theatre (est. 1929, 2,000 seats but stage not big enough for large productions).

From the 1940s to the 1970s the Sydney Push, an intellectual subculture of authors and activists questioning of authority, including Germaine Greer, was active.

The Sydney Dance Company under the leadership of Graeme Murphy has put on contemporary productions since the late 20th century. The Australian Ballet, whose headquarters are in Melbourne, performs regularly in Sydney.

Every May at the anniversary of the Concordia German Club, which was founded in 1883 and every Christmas the Concordia German Choir performs at the German Club in Tempe. The Choir specializes in German folk songs.

=== Music ===
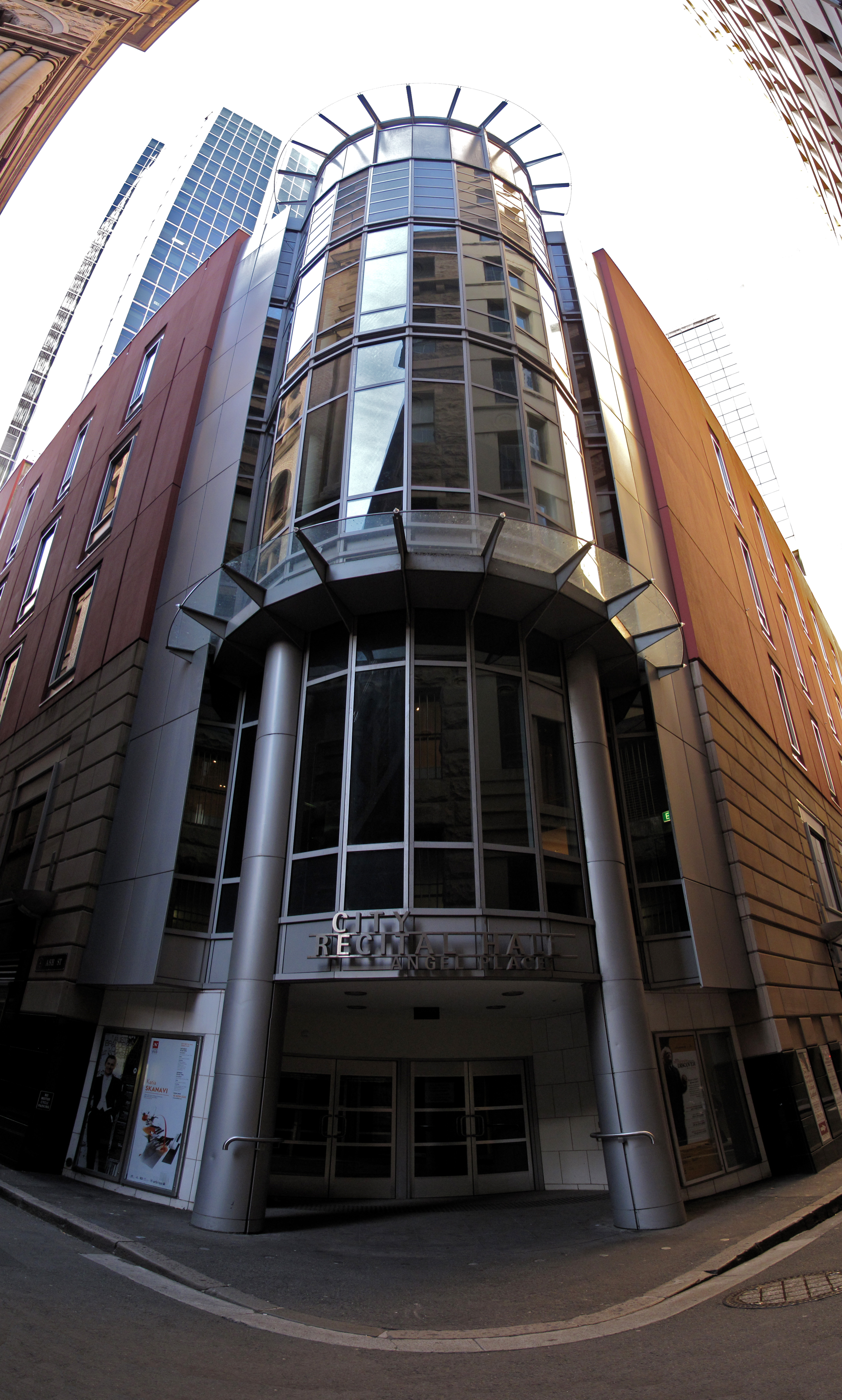
City Recital Hall, Angel Place

'O! Sydney I Love You' was the winner of a song writing competition organized by The Sun newspaper. Emily Harris studio dance recorded the song in 1927. Sydney was recorded by Maurice Chenoweth around the same time. My City of Sydney was performed by Tommy Leonetti on Channel 9 during the 1970s as the station shut down for the evening.

The Sydney Symphony is internationally renowned and regularly performs in the Concert Hall (2,600 seats) of the Sydney Opera House under Chief Conductor Vladimir Ashkenazy (until 2013) and, as of 2014, David Robertson. City Recital Hall is dedicated mainly to chamber music and chamber orchestra concerts, featuring many famous international artists as well as concert series by local groups such as the Australian Chamber Orchestra and Sydney's foremost Baroque orchestra, the Australian Brandenburg Orchestra.

Opera Australia, as at 2015 the world's third-busiest opera company, has its headquarters in Sydney and performs a busy program of mainly classical and occasionally contemporary operas at the Opera Theatre of the Sydney Opera House.

New experimental and avant-garde music is performed by Ensemble Offspring, Halcyon, The Noise and others, at the recently refurbished Carriageworks and many small inner-city cafes, warehouses, theatres etc. Liquid Architecture, What Is Music and The NOW now are annual festivals and ongoing series of contemporary music and sound art.

Jazz and alternative music (such as Sydney-based The Necks) are played at The Basement and Jazz at 72, and formerly at the now defunct Harbourside Brasserie. The Sound Lounge (SIMA), Jazzgroove, 505 and Red Rattler host regular jazz and alternative music events.

Many well-known Australian rock bands and solo artists began their careers in Sydney. Various Sydney inductees into the ARIA Hall of Fame include Johnny O'Keefe, Col Joye (& The Joy Boys), Billy Thorpe (the original Aztecs formed in Sydney), The Easybeats, Sherbet, Richard Clapton, John Paul Young, AC/DC, Radio Birdman, Midnight Oil, Rose Tattoo, Mental As Anything, INXS, Icehouse and Divinyls.

Other notable acts include early rockers Lonnie Lee & the Leemen, Dig Richards & The R'Jays and Johnny Rebb & The Rebels, surf group The Atlantics, beat groups Ray Brown & The Whispers, The Missing Links and The Throb. The 1970s saw "progressive" acts like Tamam Shud, Tully and Blackfeather emerge, followed by glam groups Hush & Ted Mulry Gang.

Sydney is famous for its alternative rock scene, with such names as The Celibate Rifles, indie rockers The Clouds, The Vines, Longreef and The Crystal Set, to electronic music pioneers Severed Heads, Single Gun Theory, The Lab, Itch-E and Scratch-E and local favourites Sneaky Sound System. Sydney is the original home of the now national alternative rock festival the Big Day Out, which began in Sydney in 1992 featuring local bands such as You Am I and The Clouds and international groups like Nirvana.

Other notable bands from the Sydney music scene are Angelspit, Wolfmother, Thy Art Is Murder, and 5 Seconds of Summer.

Sydney has a prominent indie or lo-fi scene which features many rising, internationally touring bands such as Royal Headache, Circle Pit, Electric Flu and Raw Prawn. While not as widespread as Melbourne's 'scene', Sydney tends to have a mass of tight-knit groups of bands that will tour together, most of which are on the same record label(s).

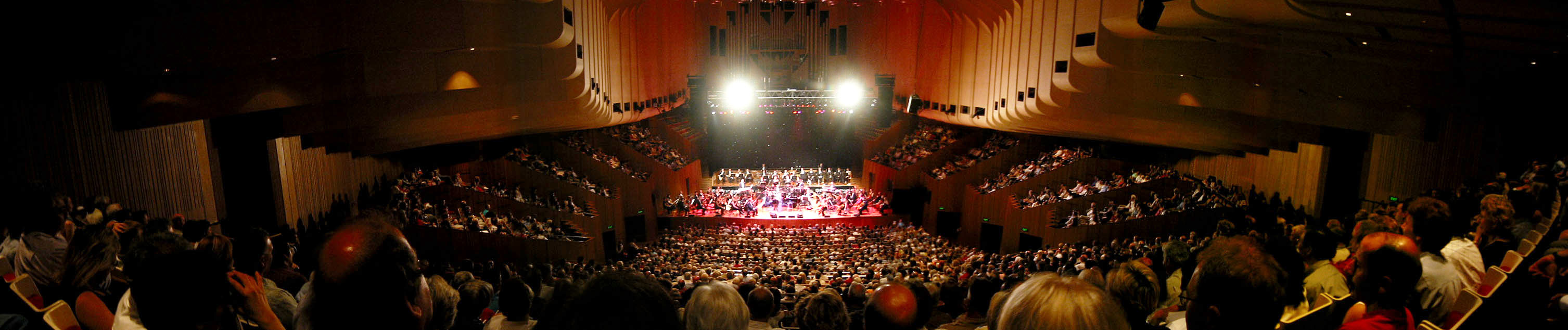
The interior of the Concert Hall at the Sydney Opera House

=== Film ===
Sydney is Australia's centre for commercial film and media. Many of the landmarks in Sydney have been referenced, shown and been the setting for countless films and television programs. Many films have been set in the city, including Finding Nemo, which was set in Sydney Harbour. The city was used as downtown Angel Grove in 20th Century Fox's Mighty Morphin Power Rangers: The Movie (1995). The Matrix was also filmed in Sydney.

The international Sydney Film Festival takes place each year in June at various venues in the CBD.

Other film festivals in Sydney include the renowned short film festivals Tropfest and Flickerfest.

=== Children's entertainment ===
A large portion of Australia's children's entertainment originates in Sydney including highly successful musical groups The Wiggles and Hi-5 and television programs Play School, Bananas in Pyjamas, Saturday Disney, Skippy the Bush Kangaroo, Mr. Squiggle and many others.

== Museums and galleries ==
=== History and culture ===
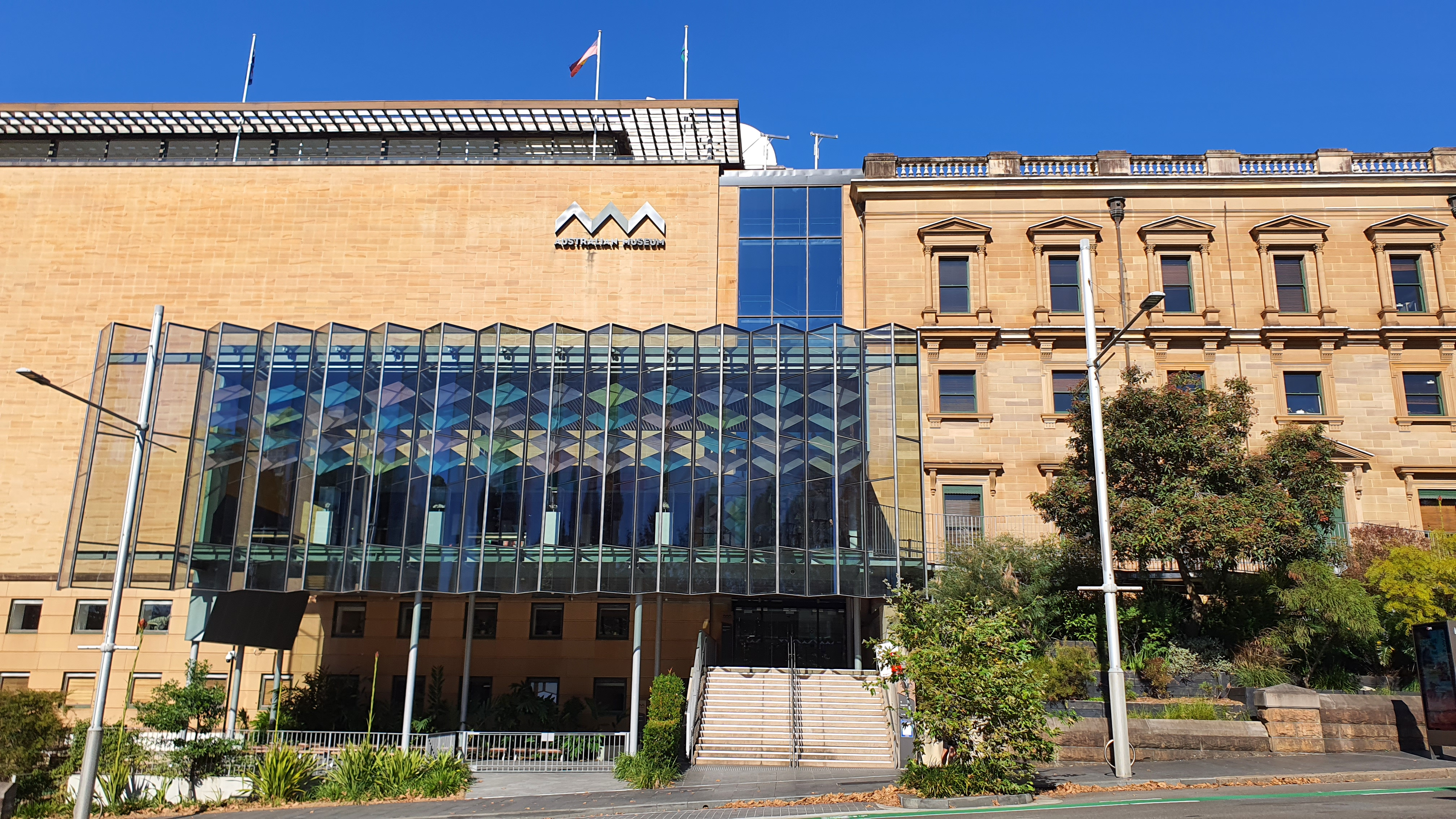
The Australian Museum on the corner of William and College street, is the oldest natural history museum in Australia and the fifth oldest natural history museum in the world. 2023

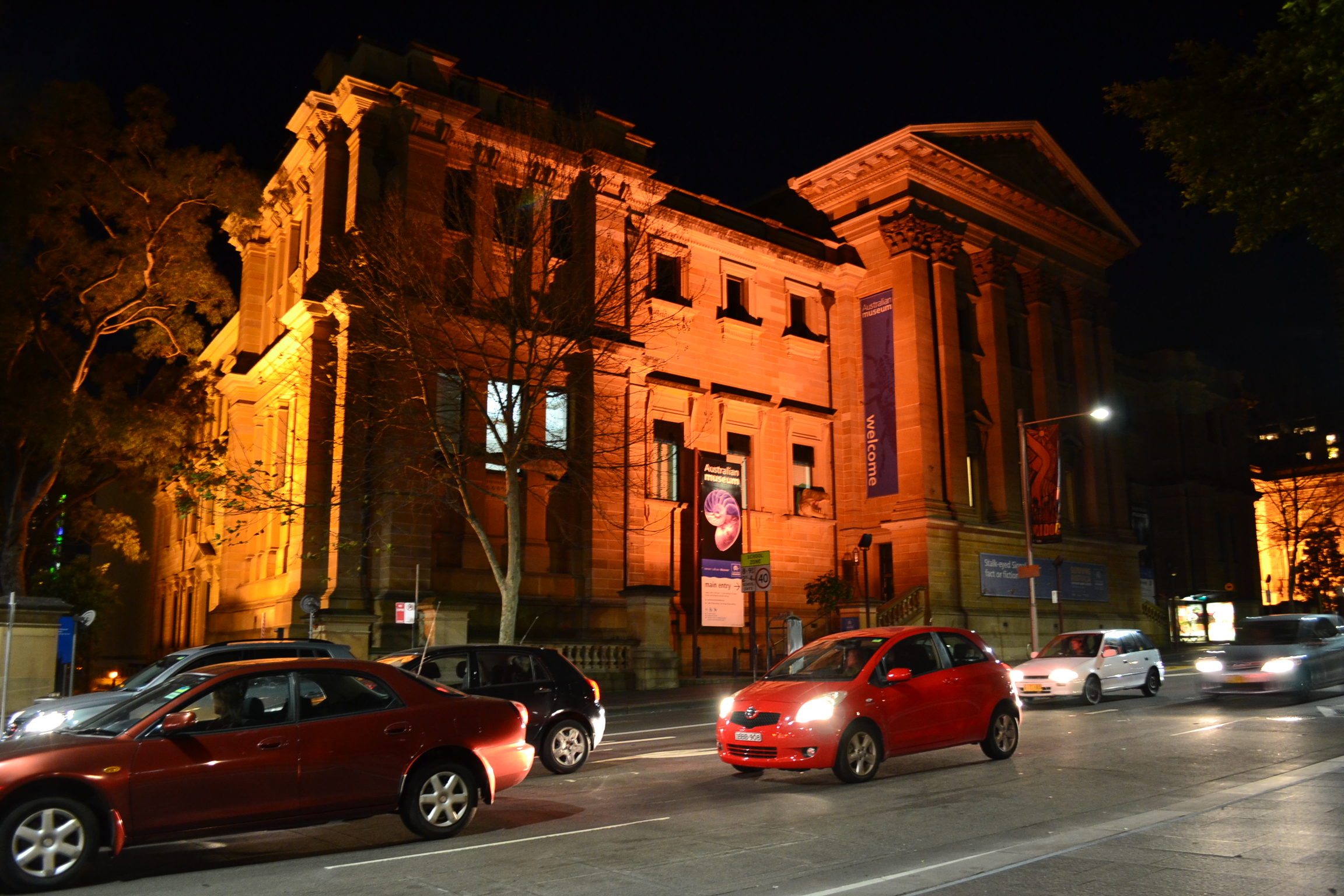
The Australian Museum at night. 2011

Sydney has a long and rich history, which is reflected in its many history museums and historic sites. The Museum of Sydney is built on the remains of the first Government House, and gives an overview of the city's development from before British colonisation to the present day. Other historic sites and living history museums with a focus on Sydney's convict and colonial past include Fort Denison, Elizabeth Bay House, Hyde Park Barracks, the Rocks Discovery Museum, the Justice and Police Museum, Susannah Place, and Sydney Mint. Many of these sites are managed by Museums of History NSW, which also hosts the annual Sydney Open festival in November in which buildings of historic or aesthetic value around the city are opened to the public.

As Sydney is a coastal city, several museums focus on the city's maritime history. In Darling Harbour, the federally funded Australian National Maritime Museum tells the broad story of the nation's connection with the sea. The nearby Sydney Heritage Fleet also operates several historic vessels including the 19th century barque James Craig.

There are also several military history museums in Sydney, including regimental museums associated with local units. These include the New South Wales Lancers Memorial Museum in Parramatta, the Australian Army Military Police Museum and Museum of Military Engineering in Holsworthy Barracks, and the Army Museum of New South Wales in Victoria Barracks, Paddington.

Several museums are dedicated to the city's culture and diverse communities. Qtopia Sydney, opened in the former Darlinghurst Police Station in 2024, focuses on the history of the city's LGBTQI+ community. Also in Darlinghurst, the Sydney Jewish Museum tells the story of The Holocaust and the history of Australia's Jewish community. In Chinatown there is also the Museum of Chinese in Australia (MOCA) which shares the Chinese-Australian story.

Outside central Sydney, there are museums in Sydney's suburbs that showcase local history and art. Notable examples include the Camden Museum and Fairfield City Museum and Gallery in Sydney's west, the Hawkesbury Regional Museum in the city's northwest, and Manly Art Gallery and Museum in the city's north.

Several of the city's universities operate their own museums focused on art and history. On the campus of the University of Sydney, the Chau Chak Wing Museum combines the collections of the former Nicholson and Macleay Museums, housing displays on archaeology, ancient history and natural history. There are also museums and galleries on the grounds of Macquarie University in North Ryde with exhibits on art, history, biology and numismatics.

=== Science and technology ===
The city's first museum, the Australian Museum, was established in 1827 and is the oldest natural history museum in Australia. It conducts research and houses exhibits on natural history, Indigenous culture, and ethnography.

Another significant museum dedicated to science is the Powerhouse Museum, which houses a range of exhibits on applied arts and technology. It operates across several sites including its main building in Ultimo, the Sydney Observatory, a conservation centre in Castle Hill, and a new site in Parramatta.

In addition, there are several specialty museums dedicated to the history of technology. The Sydney Bus Museum in Leichhardt and the Sydney Tramway Museum in Loftus focus on the city's public transport systems, while the Museum of Fire in Penrith houses exhibits on firefighting and the state's fire service.

=== Visual arts ===
Sydney has been home to many visual artists, from the lush pastoralism of Lloyd Rees depictions of Sydney Harbour to Jeffrey Smart's portraits of bleak urban alienation, from the psychedelic visions of Brett Whiteley to a plethora of contemporary artists.

The Art Gallery of New South Wales (AGNSW), alongside major collections of Australian colonial and 20th-century art and some works by European masters, has the largest and most important collection of Aboriginal art anywhere in the world. The Archibald Prize for portraiture (Australia's most prestigious art prize), the Sulman Prize for subject/genre painting and the Wynne Prize for landscape painting are awarded each year by the trustees of the AGNSW.

The Museum of Contemporary Art (MCA) at West Circular Quay is Australia's foremost contemporary art museum, featuring a mixture of exhibitions from the museum's permanent collection and visiting shows by major international artists. The Biennale of Sydney is an important festival dedicated to the contemporary visual arts, held bi-annually at the MCA and at various other venues around the city and often spilling into the streets. Another visual arts festival held at the MCA each spring is Primavera, a festival focusing on young, up-and-coming Australian artists.

A huge wrap-around mural by renowned American artist Sol LeWitt can be seen in the foyer of Australia Square Tower on the corner of George, Bond and Pitt Streets. Outside the tower, facing George Street, there is a large abstract steel sculpture by American sculptor Alexander Calder.

There are many commercial galleries focusing mainly on cutting-edge contemporary art all around the inner city suburbs of Woollahra, Newtown, Surry Hills, Paddington, Darlinghurst, Camperdown etc.

Graffiti and street art thrive in Sydney. The Newtown, Surry Hills and Glebe areas in particular have many innovative examples of murals and other street art.

A recent addition is Art Month Sydney, a month-long festival of the visual arts held throughout March and the annual Art & About Sydney Festival.

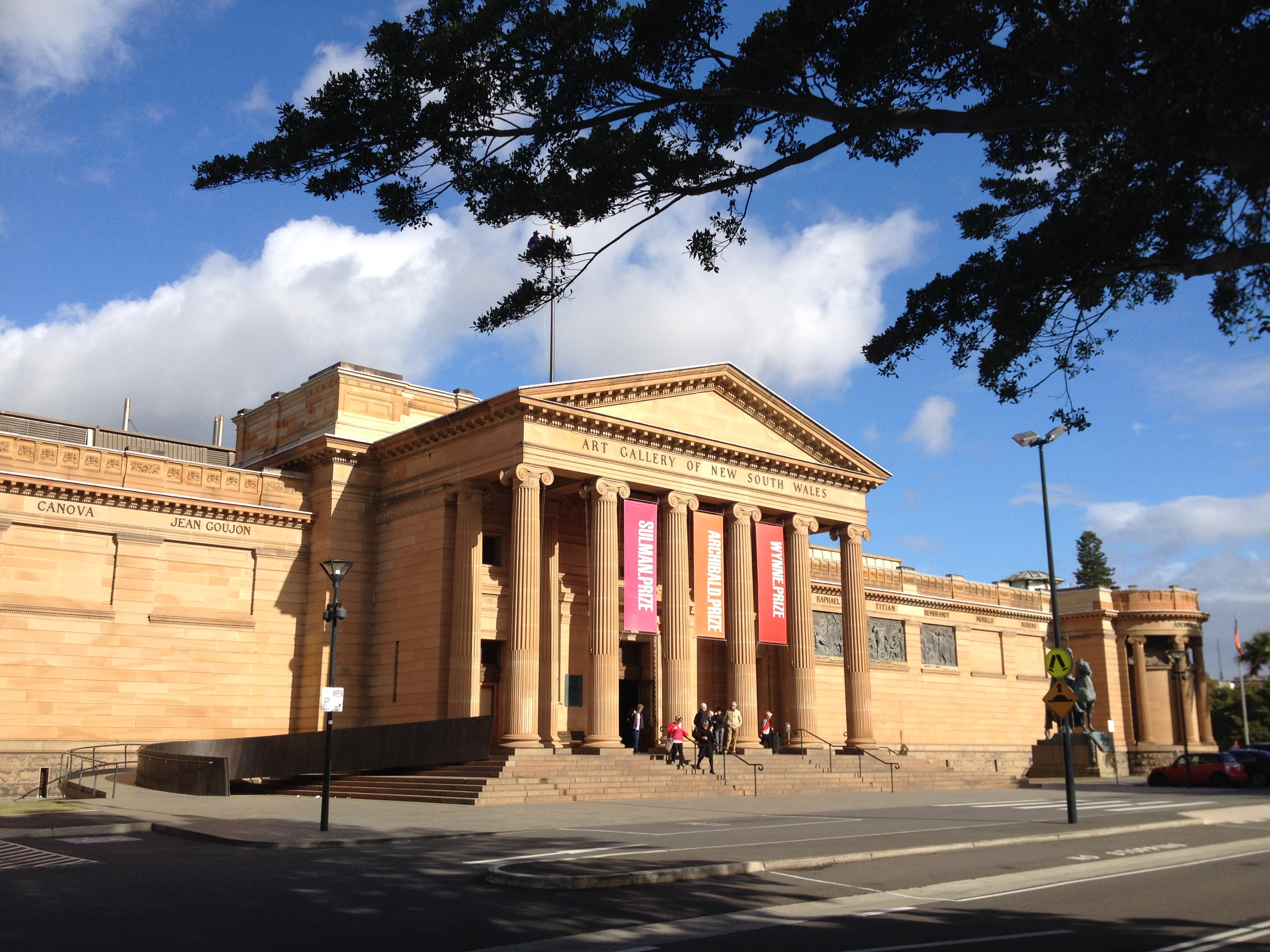
The Art Gallery of New South Wales

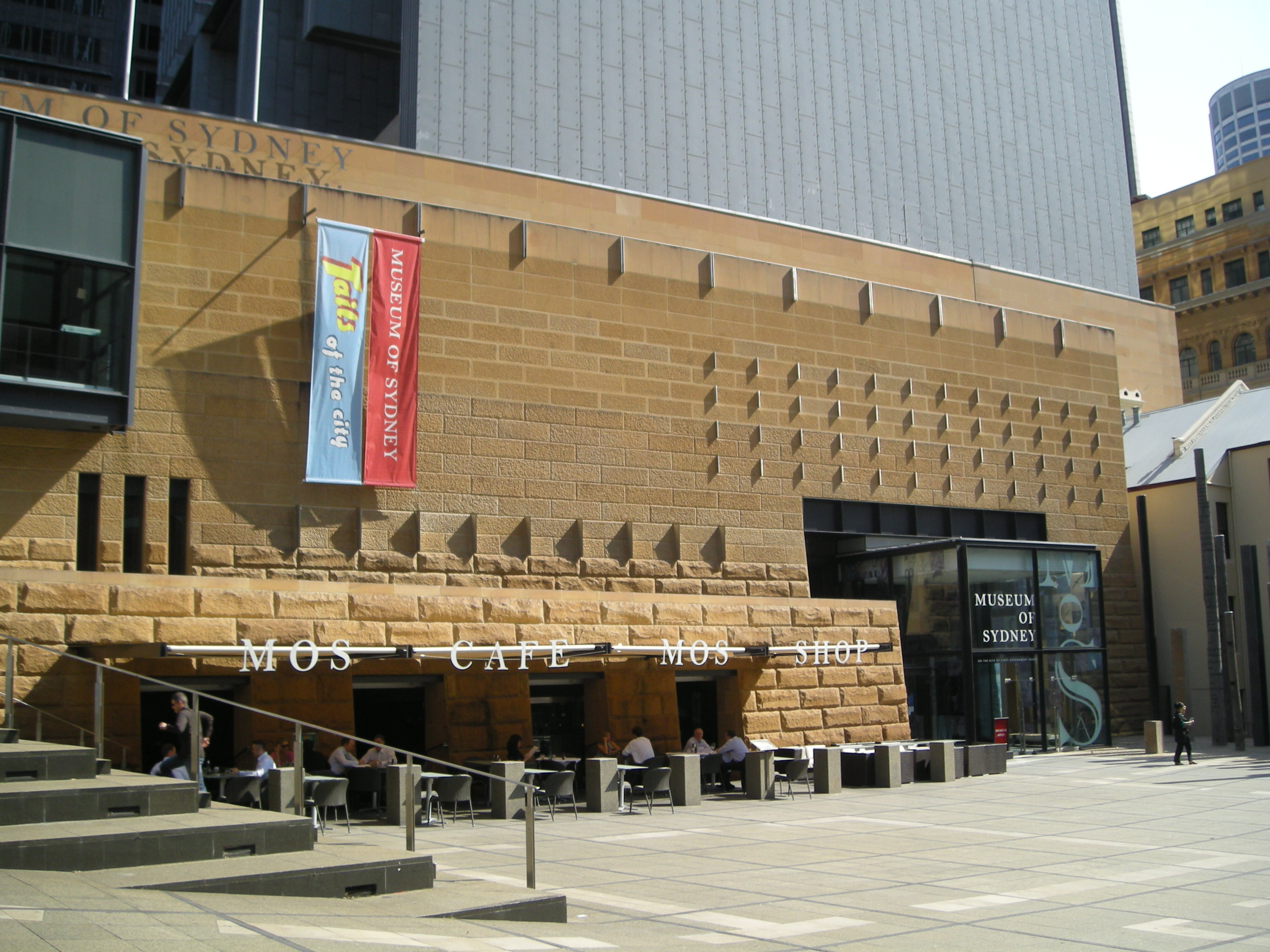
The Museum of Sydney

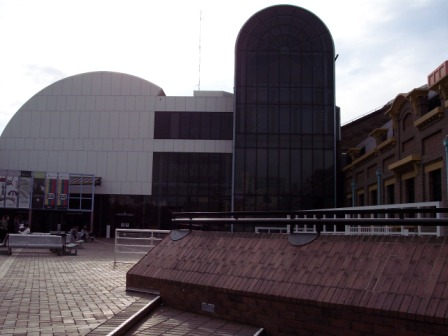
The entry to the Powerhouse Museum

== Literature and libraries ==
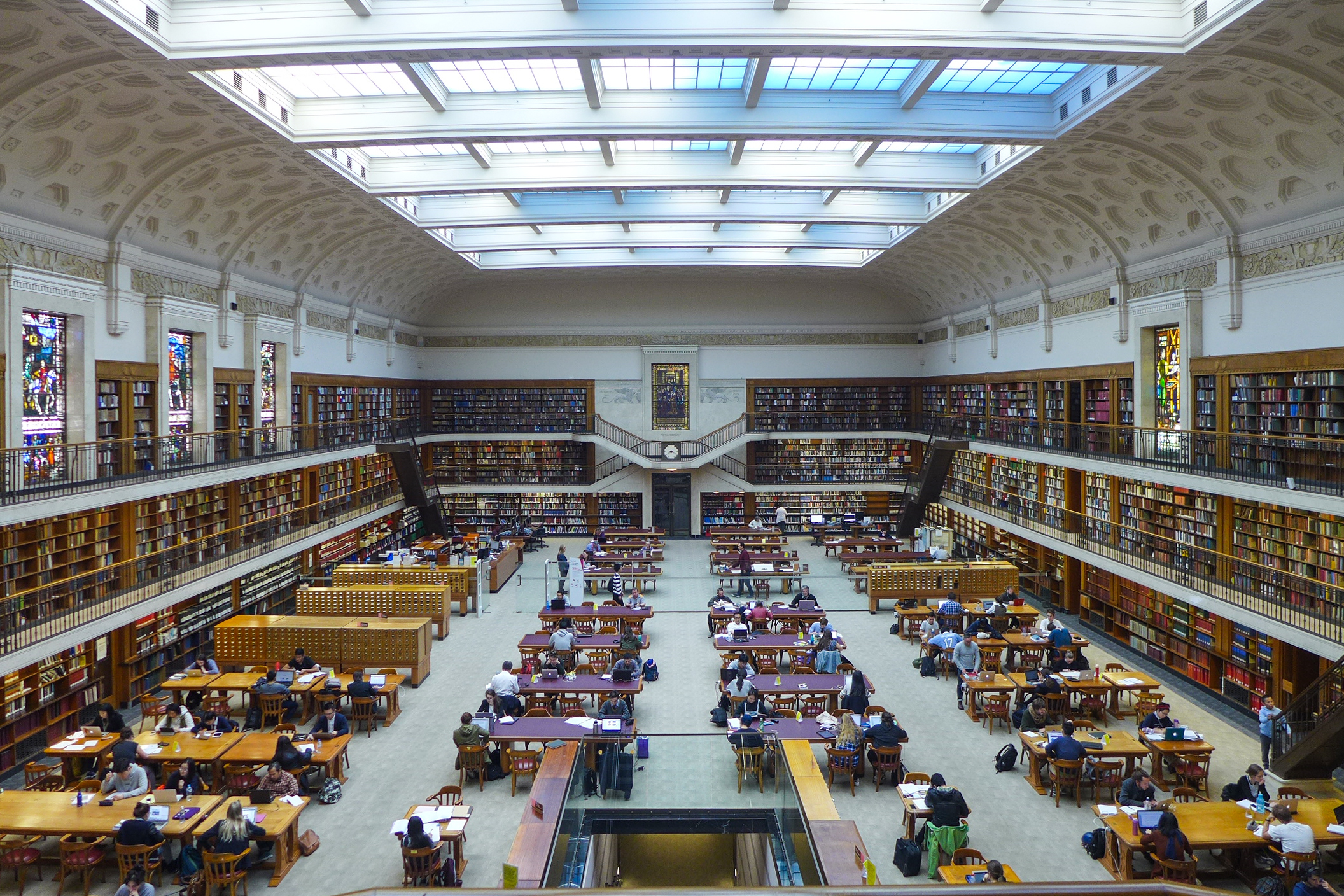
Reading Room, State Library of New South Wales (2017)

The Sydney Writers' Festival based in Walsh Bay, is held each year in May, featuring readings and discussions by Australian and international writers. An array of novels have used Sydney as a setting, notably Ruth Park's The Harp in the South, which charts the slums of 1930s–40s Sydney, Christina Stead's Seven Poor Men of Sydney which addresses a similar theme of life in the poor neighbourhoods, and Elizabeth Harrower's Down in the City–set in a King's Cross apartment in the late 1950s. More contemporary examples include Melina Marchetta's Looking for Alibrandi, J. M. Coetzee's Diary of a Bad Year, Peter Carey's 30 Days in Sydney, Patrick White's The Eye of the Storm and Kate Grenville's The Secret River. Prolific writers from the city include Geraldine Brooks, Jackie French, Kathy Lette, Phillip Knightley and Richard Neville.

The largest library in Sydney is the State Library of New South Wales, which holds over 4.7 million items, including two million books, and hosts free exhibitions in its gallery spaces. Most local government areas within Sydney have local libraries including the City of Sydney Library with eight local branches, the Bankstown City Library, the Max Webber Library in Blacktown and many others.

== Tourism ==
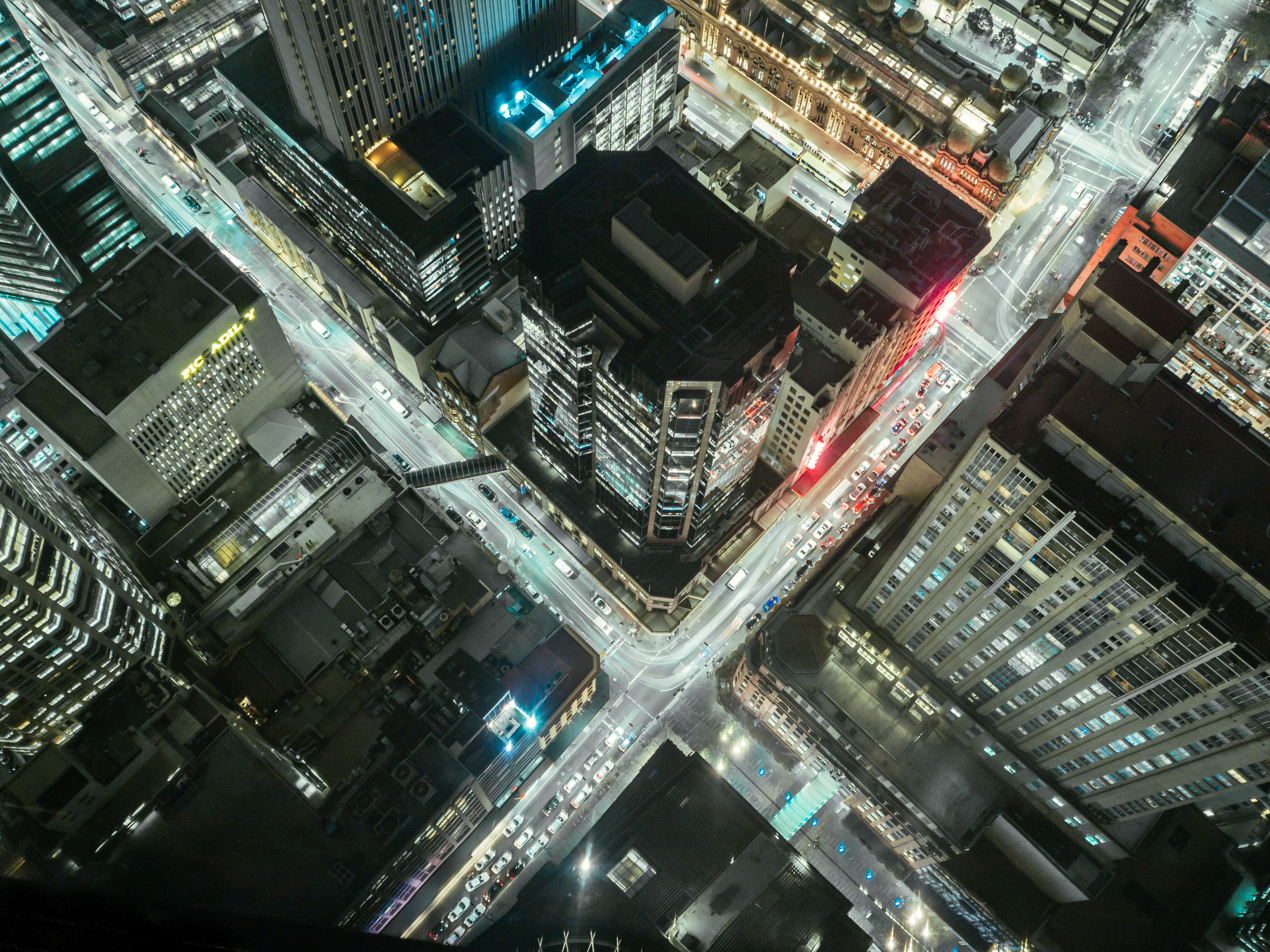
The observation deck of the Sydney Tower boasts views of the CBD and city surrounds.

Many of the tourist attractions are scattered all over the city, the most famous and visited being the Sydney Opera House and the Sydney Harbour Bridge. Other attractions include the Royal Botanical Gardens, the Art Gallery of New South Wales, the Museum of Contemporary Art, White Rabbit Gallery and Sydney Tower.

Sydney's nightlife has declined since the introduction of lockout laws, which call for 1.30am lockouts and 3am last drinks. Prior to the introduction of the laws, Kings Cross was known as the city's red-light district. There are huge celebrations for New Year's Eve and Australia Day in Sydney, including a fireworks display that features the Harbour Bridge.

Many festivals are held in Sydney, including the Sydney Festival, a celebration of partly free performances throughout January; Vivid Sydney, a festival of light and music held annually in May–June; the Gay and Lesbian Mardi Gras (see below); the annual Sydney Film Festival and many smaller festivals such as Tropfest.

There are also several music festivals including Big Day Out, Homebake, The Great Escape, and Stereosonic.

== Sport ==
Sport is an important part of the culture in Sydney. New South Wales has attracted many international multi-sport events including the 2000 Summer Olympics, held in Sydney. Sydney was also the host of the 1938 British Empire Games. The Olympic Stadium, now known as ANZ Stadium, is the scene of the annual NRL Grand Final. It also regularly hosts rugby league State of Origin as well as rugby union and soccer internationals. It hosted the final of the 2003 Rugby World Cup and the memorable soccer World Cup qualifier between Australia and Uruguay.

The Sydney Cricket Ground traditionally hosts the 'New Year' cricket test match from 2–6 January each year. The annual Sydney to Hobart Yacht Race begins in Sydney Harbour on Boxing Day, whilst the climax of Australia's touring car racing series is the Bathurst 1000, held at the Mount Panorama Circuit near the city of Bathurst in the Western Plains.

The Sydney Autumn Racing Carnival features the richest two-year-old horse race in the world, the Golden Slipper Stakes, which is run in April every year. The Medibank International tennis tournament is held in January prior to the Australian Open. The City to Surf foot race is held every August and is one of the largest timed foot races in the world.

=== Rugby ===
Rugby league football has a place with some Sydneysiders, as a sporting and a tradition within the city. This stems back from the earlier colonial days of the city where the city and its cultural were largely dictated by wealthy Englishmen whom traditionally played and were supporters of the Rugby code of football, which was largely advertised and passed on to the people of Sydney, including the working class who in back in England largely played soccer. The game quickly grew a working-class following, and has been a Sydney tradition ever since.

The headquarters of the Australian Rugby League and National Rugby League (NRL) are in Sydney, which is home to nine of the 16 NRL football clubs (Sydney Roosters, South Sydney Rabbitohs, Parramatta Eels, Cronulla Sharks, Wests Tigers, Penrith Panthers, Bulldogs and Manly-Warringah Sea Eagles), as well as being the northern home of the St George Illawarra Dragons, which is half-based in Wollongong.

Sydney has a local club rugby union competition (the Shute Shield), and a Super Rugby team the NSW Waratahs, who play their games in the city and represent the entire state of New South Wales. They were represented in the defunct Australian Rugby Championship by Sydney Fleet, Western Sydney Rams and Central Coast Rays. The National Rugby Championship has four NSW teams: Sydney Stars, Greater Sydney Rams, North Harbour Rays and NSW Country Eagles. The Australian Rugby Union headquarters are located in Sydney. The Waratahs play out of the Sydney Football Stadium, and when in Sydney the Wallabies play out of Stadium Australia.

=== Australian rules football ===
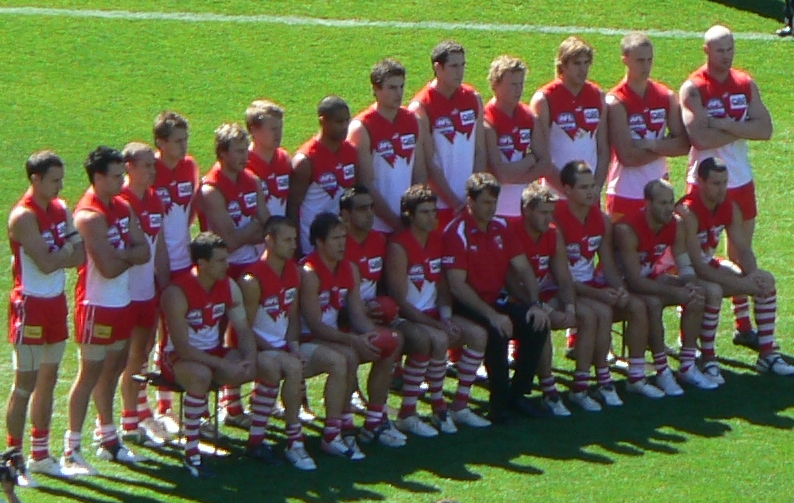
The Sydney Swans AFL team

Australian rules football, commonly known as Australian Football League (AFL), is a developing game in most of NSW with increasing popularity. In Sydney, local competitions established in 1880 and again in 1903 competed with rugby union football and then rugby league football.

The AFL has two teams from Sydney, the Sydney Swans and the Greater Western Sydney Giants. Formerly South Melbourne, the Swans moved up to Sydney in 1982, after hitting financial trouble. The Swans have won two premierships since moving to Sydney (in 2005 and 2012). Attendance for Swans matches has slowly risen since their relocation. The Giants, based in Western Sydney and Canberra, joined the AFL in 2012. The inaugural AFL Women's in 2017 included a GWS Giants team.

=== Soccer ===
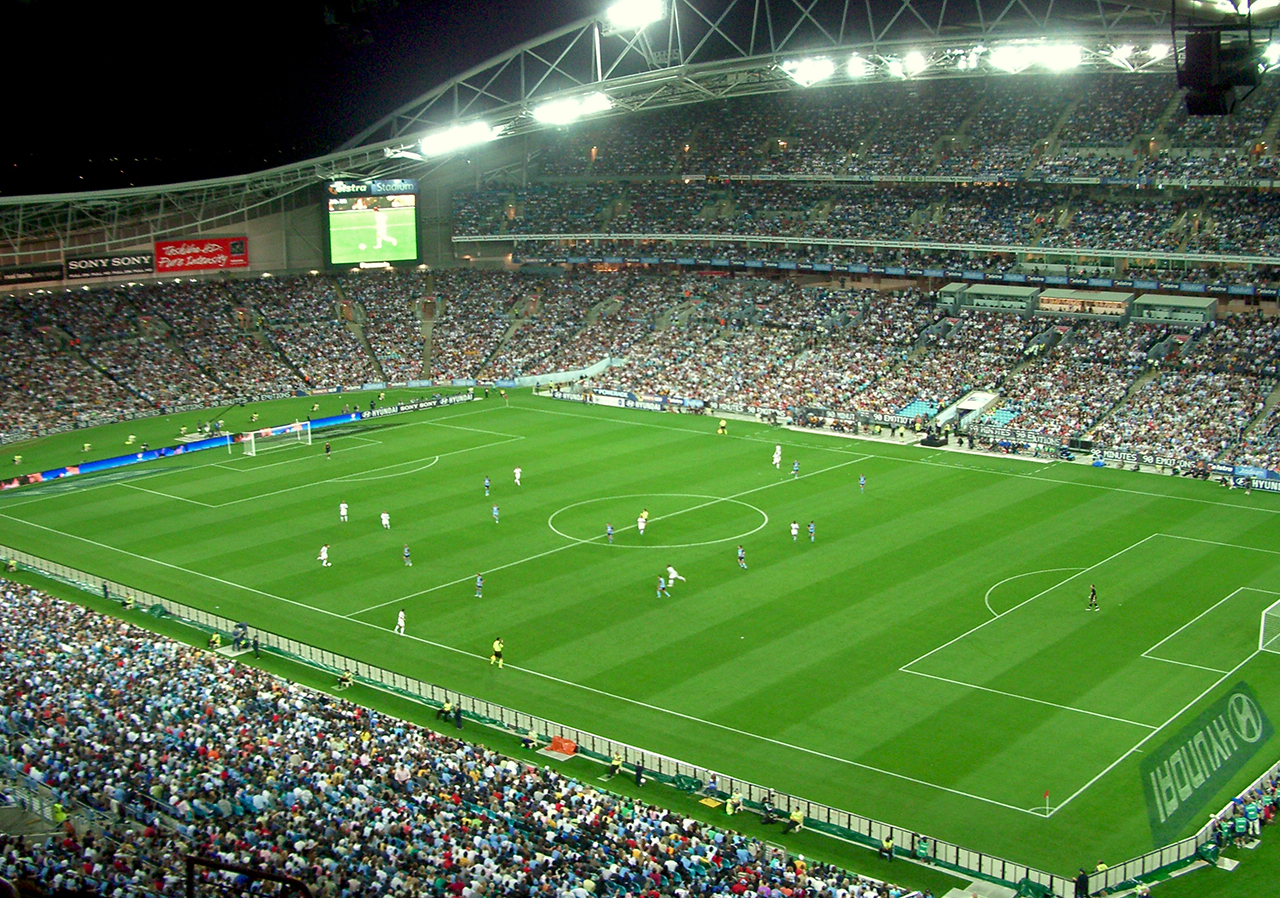
Sydney FC playing the Los Angeles Galaxy at ANZ Stadium during 2007.

Whilst having a strong sporting tradition in the field of Rugby League, Sydney also has a long and strong tradition in association football. Early football clubs in Sydney were relatively small, and did not have very large followings, and like the general population of Sydney in the late 1800s the clubs were largely English in nature, but when the Australian government began its immigration policy in years closely following World War II, many immigrants left Europe in search of new homes in Sydney, and Australia in general. These migrant groups who were subject to racism from the existing population took it upon themselves to found their own football clubs, celebrating their particular ethnic communities.

The three largest such clubs were founded by the three largest post war immigration groups respectively, they are: Marconi Stallions Football Club (Italian), Sydney Olympic Football Club (Greek), and Sydney United Football Club (Croatian). Along with these larger clubs, there are also many smaller clubs formed by ethnic groups, who also bare suburban names, such as Bankstown City Lions Football Club (Macedonian), Bonnyrigg White Eagles (Serbian), Parramatta Eagles (Maltese), and St. George Saints Football Club (Hungarian). These "ethnic" clubs soon began to dominate football in Sydney, drawing large crowd support from their given ethnic groups, and having their fair share of on field success too.

In 2005, a new club was founded in Sydney called Sydney FC, who were to be based in central Sydney as opposed to being based at a small suburban stadium, and were founded specifically to attract a multicultural following. They were entered in a new league to be known as the A-League, this would act as the show piece national football competition, contested by similarly formed clubs from other large cities around Australia. In the first 6 years of their existence, Sydney FC have been relatively successful building up a solid support base of around 10,000 members, and sometimes attracting crowds of up to 40,000.

=== Cricket ===
The NSW Blues are by far the most successful domestic cricket side in Australia having won the First-class competition 44 times and the One-Day Domestic cup nine times. They occasionally play first-class matches against touring International sides. The team's main home ground is the Sydney Cricket Ground. In the Twenty20 Big Bash League and Women's Big Bash League, the state is represented by the Sydney Sixers, playing at the Sydney Cricket Ground and the Sydney Thunder, playing at the Sydney Showground.

=== Basketball and netball ===
The Sydney Kings and Wollongong Hawks are the state's representatives in the National Basketball League (NBL). These teams have all featured in the finals series since 2002–03, the Kings winning 3 consecutive premierships in 2002–03, 2003–04 & 2004–05. There are 12 teams in the New South Wales conference of the Australian Basketball Association, the Waratah League. The Sydney Uni Flames play in the Women's National Basketball League. Giants Netball were formed when the Greater Western Sydney Giants football club were given one of the three licenses for new teams for the first season of the Super Netball league in 2017.

== Communities and subcultures ==
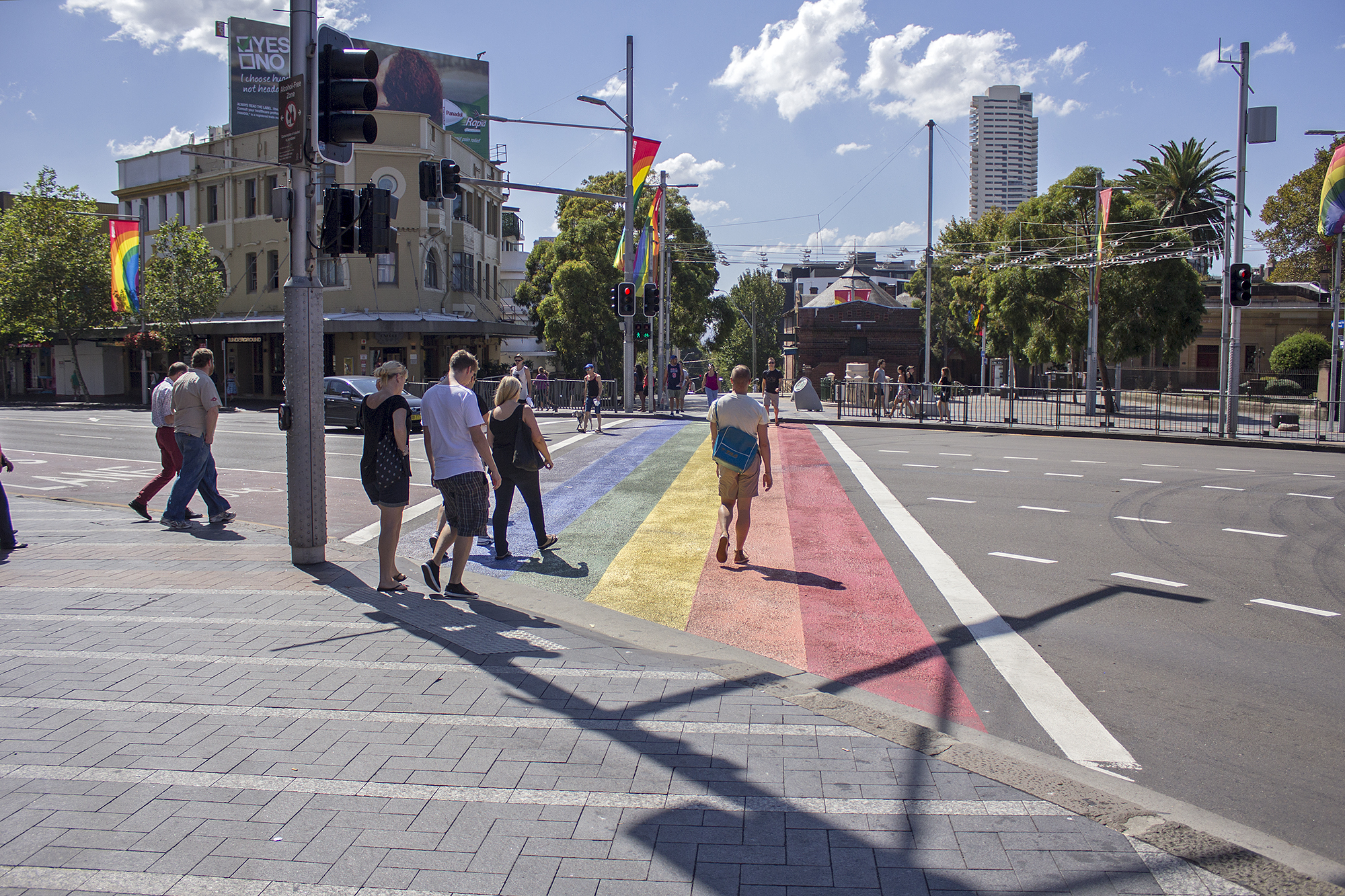
The temporary rainbow crossing on Oxford St adjacent to Taylor Square. First installed in February 2013 for the 35th Sydney Gay and Lesbian Mardi Gras it was then removed in April 2013.

=== Multicultural communities ===
Sydney is one of the most multicultural cities in the world, with 43.2% of the city's population born overseas according to the 2021 census. Some suburbs and neighbourhoods have adopted a unique local character reflective of the ethnocultural makeup of the area, with Sydney known as a 'city of villages'.

In the CBD, Haymarket serves as a hub for some of the city's Asian Australian communities. Chinatown has been a traditional cultural and commercial centre for the Chinese Australian diaspora since the 19th century. There is also a Koreatown on Pitt St, and a Thai Town close to Central station where many Thai businesses and restaurants are concentrated.

In the inner west, Leichhardt has been a focal point for the Italian Australian community since the 1920s. Marrickville has also been recognised as 'Little Greece', while there is a significant Portuguese Australian presence in Petersham. Further afield, there are significant Chinese enclaves in Burwood, Hurstville, Rhodes and Chatswood, and an officially recognised Koreatown in Eastwood.

Western Sydney is a highly culturally diverse region, with the suburb of Auburn the area with the highest proportion of overseas-born people in Australia according to the 2021 census. Lakemba, which hosts annual Ramadan night markets and is home to the largest mosque in the country, is a hub for the city's Muslim communities. The suburb of Harris Park has also been officially recognised as 'Little India', while Cabramatta has been a centre for the city's Vietnamese Australian community since the 1970s.

=== LGBTIQ community ===
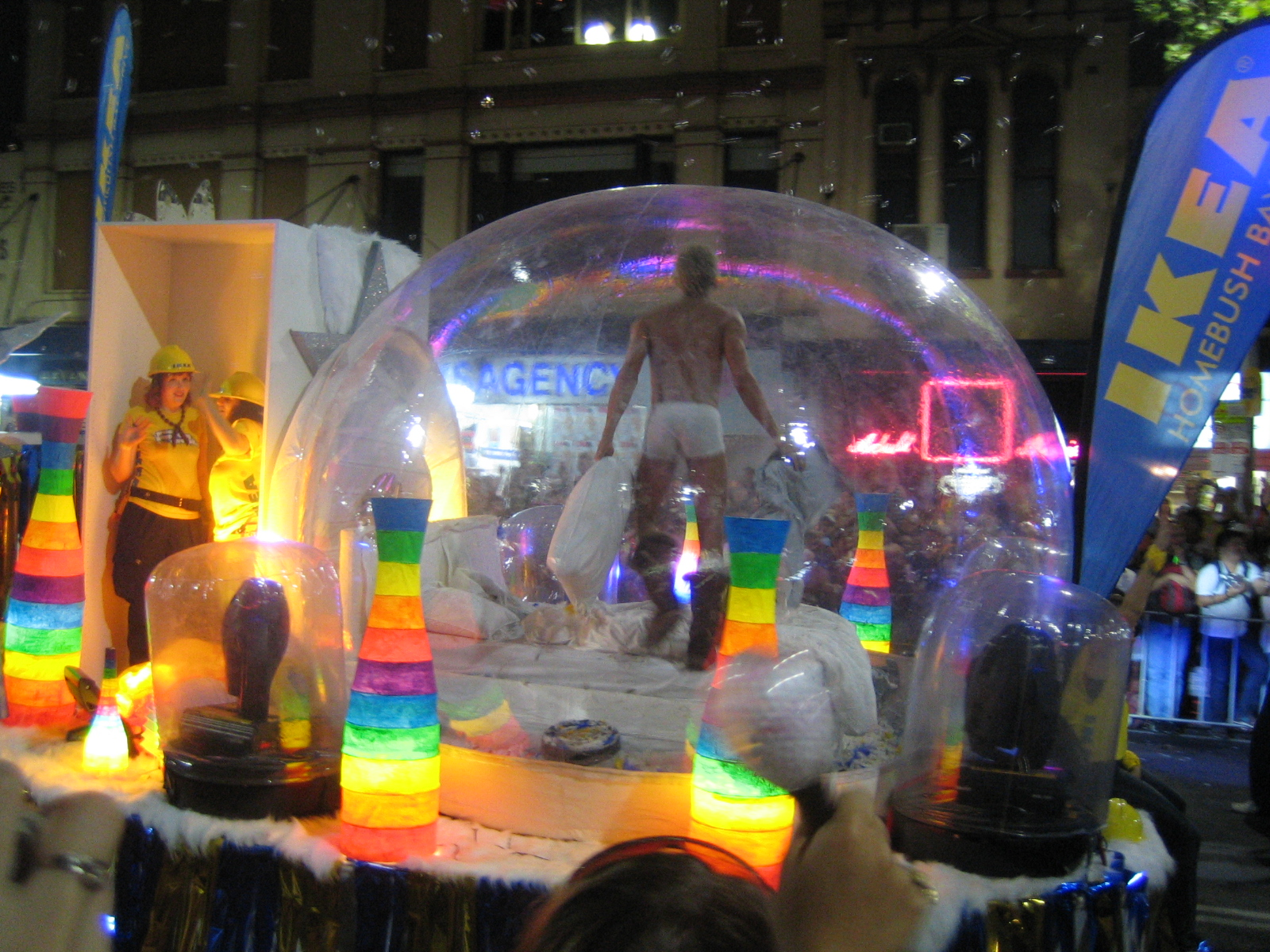
Participants in the 2006 Sydney Gay and Lesbian Mardi Gras.

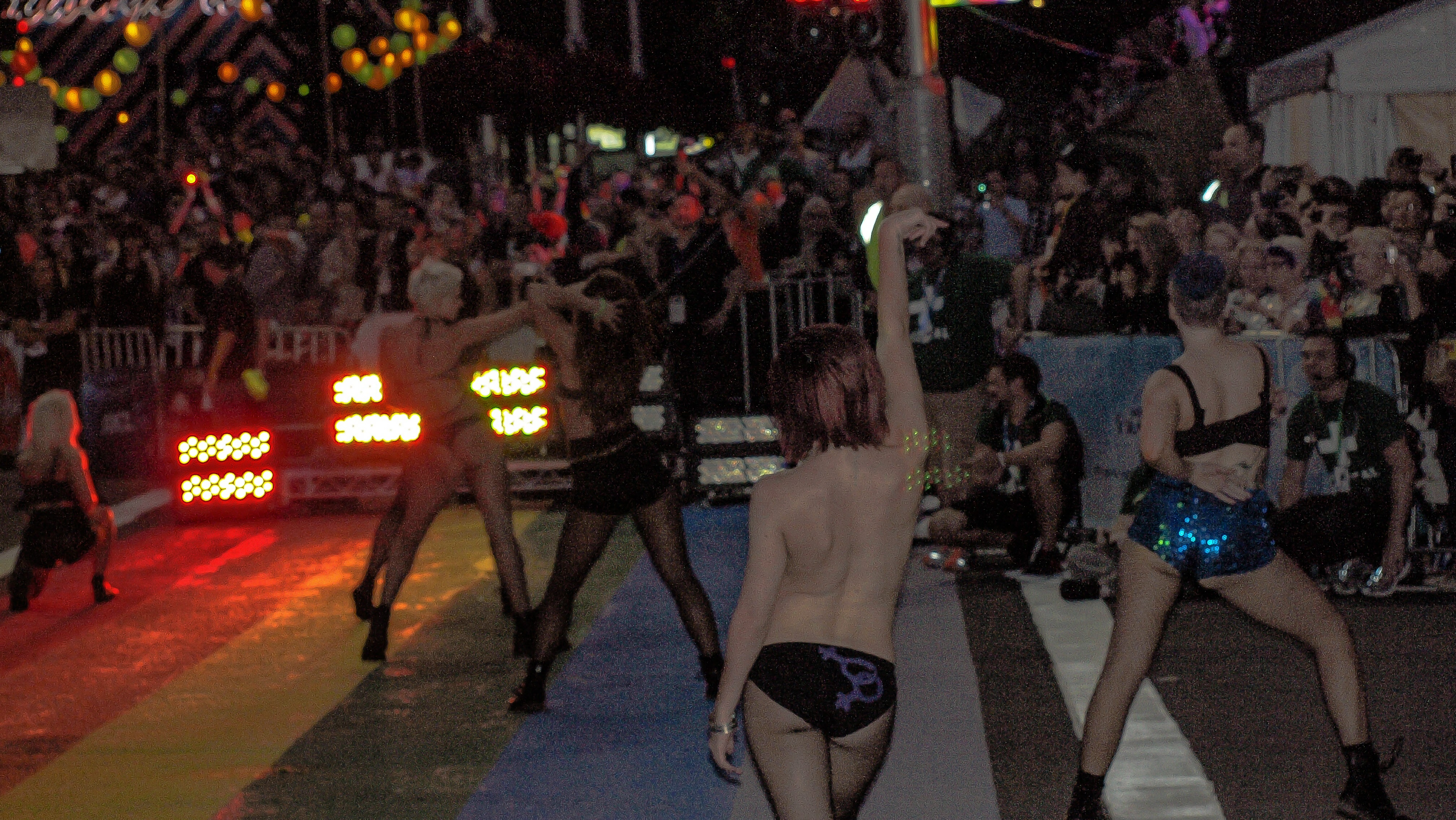
Participants in the 2013 Sydney Gay and Lesbian Mardi Gras.

Sydney has a significant LGBTIQ+ community, centred on Oxford Street, and holds the annual Sydney Gay and Lesbian Mardi Gras. The Sydney lesbian community, though still active around Oxford Street, is well established and visible in Newtown and Enmore in Sydney's Inner West. There is also a history of lesbian community congregating in Leichhardt, and other inner west suburbs. The Qtopia Sydney museum, which is situated in the former Darlinghurst police station, hosts exhibits relating to Australian LGBTQ history and the AIDS epidemic.

There are two magazines available in Sydney and one website with detailed information on Sydney's lesbian community and night-life. LOTL and Cherry magazines are free, monthly, Australia wide, publications which can be found around Oxford Street, Glebe and Newtown. The Sapphic Sydney website was a resource which detailed events and community groups as well as featuring a local business directory.

There is also a thriving independent queer publishing community in Sydney publishing magazines such as Slit, Dirty Queer, and Spunk.

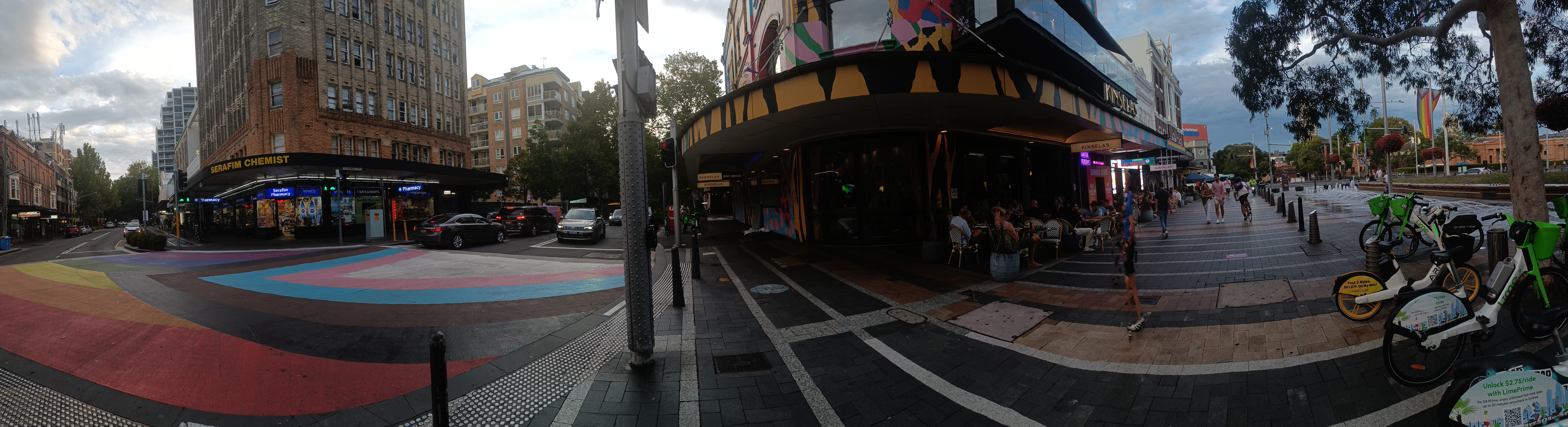
A new rainbow crossing was installed at the southern end of Taylor Square in 2019, and was updated in 2024 to include the progress pride flag.

== See also ==
- Architecture of Sydney
- Culture of Melbourne
- Culture of Auckland
