= List of museums in Sydney =

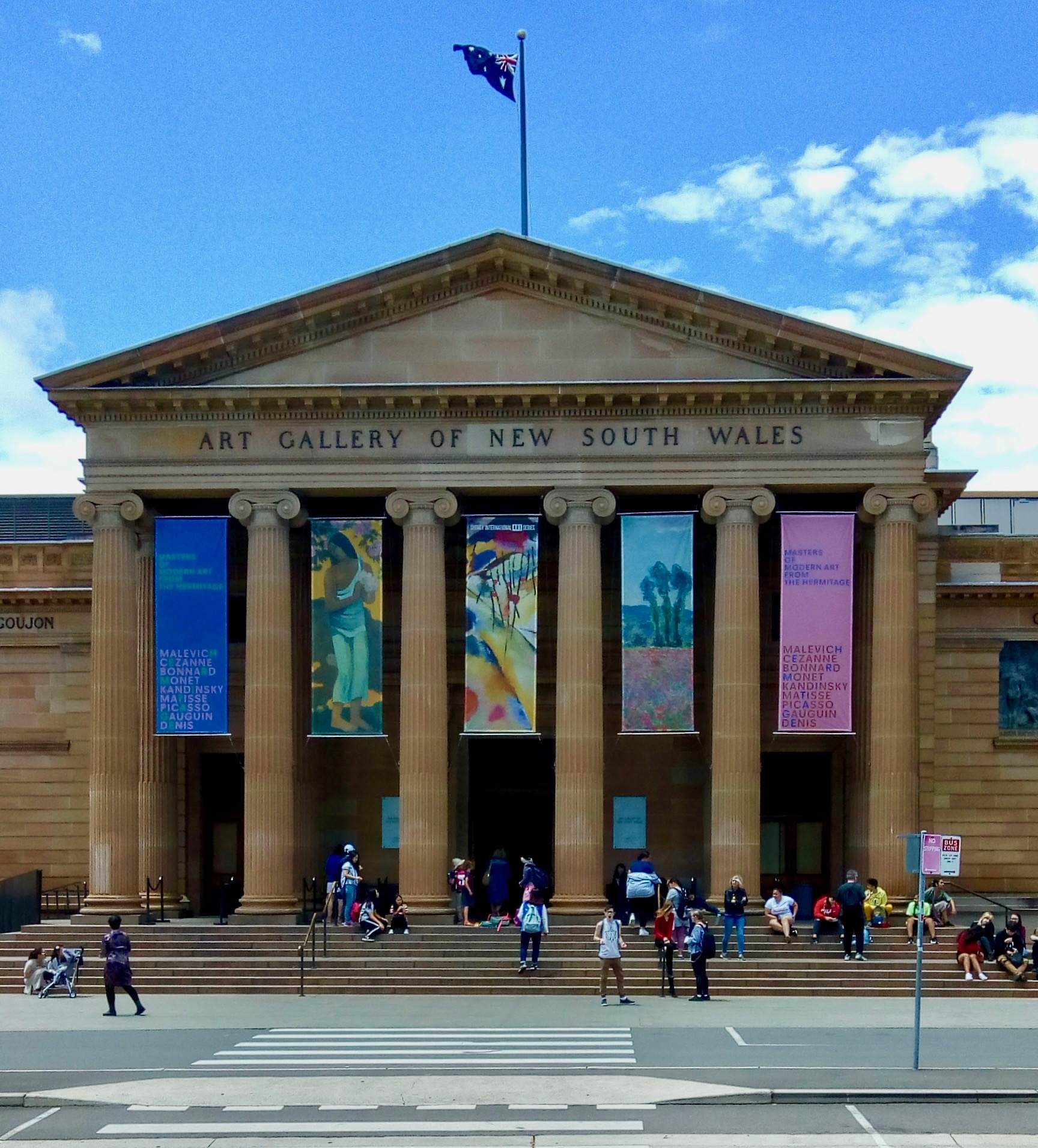
The Art Gallery of New South Wales

Sydney, Australia is home to a large number of cultural institutions, museums and historic sites, some of which are known worldwide.

Name	Type	Summary
Art Gallery of New South Wales	Art	Australian (from settlement to contemporary), European and Asian art
Artspace Sydney	Art	Contemporary art centre
Australian Army Artillery Museum	Military	Heritage and history of the Royal Australian Artillery
Australian Army Military Police Museum	Military	History of Royal Australian Corps of Military Police
Australian Army Museum of Military Engineering	Military	History of the Royal Australian Engineers
Australian Army Museum of New South Wales	Military	History of the Australian Army
Australian Aviation Museum	Aviation	History and future of aviation, space technology and the progress in world aviation
Australian Centre for Photography	Art	Former photography gallery, now owned by Museum of Applied Arts & Sciences
Australian Museum	Natural history	Animals, dinosaurs, mummies, aboriginal peoples, geology, insects
Australian National Maritime Museum	Maritime	Australia's maritime history and the nation's ongoing involvement and dependence on the sea
Australian Scout Museum	History	website, located in Building 140, Newington Armory, Sydney Olympic Park
Australian Tennis Museum	Sport	website, located in Sydney Olympic Park
Caroline Simpson Library	Sydney	Library and research collection run by MHNSW in The Mint
Chau Chak Wing Museum	History, Natural history, art	Part of the University of Sydney, contains the collections previously housed in the Nicholson Museum, Macleay Museum and Art Gallery
Elizabeth Bay House	Historic house	Mid 19th century mansion, managed by Historic Houses Trust of New South Wales
Fort Denison	Military	Mid 19th century fort and former penal site, located on an island
Government House	Historic house	Official residence of the governor of New South Wales, managed by Historic Houses Trust of New South Wales
Harry Daly Museum	Medical	Museum covering the history of anaesthesia
Hyde Park Barracks	History	Australia's convict system, daily lives of convicts and other occupants, managed by Historic Houses Trust of New South Wales
Justice and Police Museum	Law enforcement	website, managed by Historic Houses Trust of New South Wales, former police and court building
Lindesay	Historic house	Mid 19th century period house, operated by the National Trust of Australia
Lucy Osburn – Nightingale Foundation Museum	Medical	website, life of Lucy Osburn and the founding of the Sydney Hospital
Madame Tussauds Sydney	Wax	
Museum of Australian Currency Notes	Numismatic	website, operated by the Reserve Bank of Australia, story of how Australia's currency notes have reflected the country's economic and political development
Museum of Chinese in Australia	History	website
Museum of Contemporary Art Australia	Art	Contemporary art from across Australia and around the world
Museum of Human Disease	Medical	website, operated by the University of New South Wales
Museum of Sydney	History	City's history and culture, managed by Historic Houses Trust of New South Wales
Museum of Freemasonry, Sydney	Masonic	website
Museums and Collections of Macquarie University	History, art	Part of Macquarie University, various museums on history and art
NSW Schoolhouse Museum	Education	Located at North Ryde Public School, includes 1877 schoolroom
Object	Art	website, located in Surry Hills, centre for contemporary design
Powerhouse Museum	Science	Science and technology including computers, steam power, transportation
Pylon Lookout & Museum	Technology	History of the Sydney Harbour Bridge
Qtopia Sydney	History	website, LGBT history and the AIDS epidemic, located within former Darlinghurst police station
Royal Australian Navy Heritage Centre	Maritime	History of the Royal Australian Navy
S. H. Ervin Gallery	Art	Australian art, both historical and contemporary, operated by the National Trust of Australia
Susannah Place Museum	Historic house	Block of four terrace houses that document the urban working class community in The Rocks
Sydney Bus Museum	Transport	Historic buses, located within Leichhardt Bus Depot
Sydney Jewish Museum	Jewish	The Holocaust and the history of the Jewish people in Australia
Sydney Heritage Fleet	Maritime	Historic sailing and steam vessels in active use.
Sydney Mint	Numismatic	Former mint
Sydney Observatory	Science	Astronomy and related science
Sydney Tramway Museum	Transport	Operating historic trams
White Rabbit Gallery	Art	Contemporary Chinese art

== See also ==
- Culture of Sydney
- List of attractions in Sydney
- List of museums in New South Wales
