= New South Wales Lancers Memorial Museum =

New South Wales Lancers Memorial Museum Collection
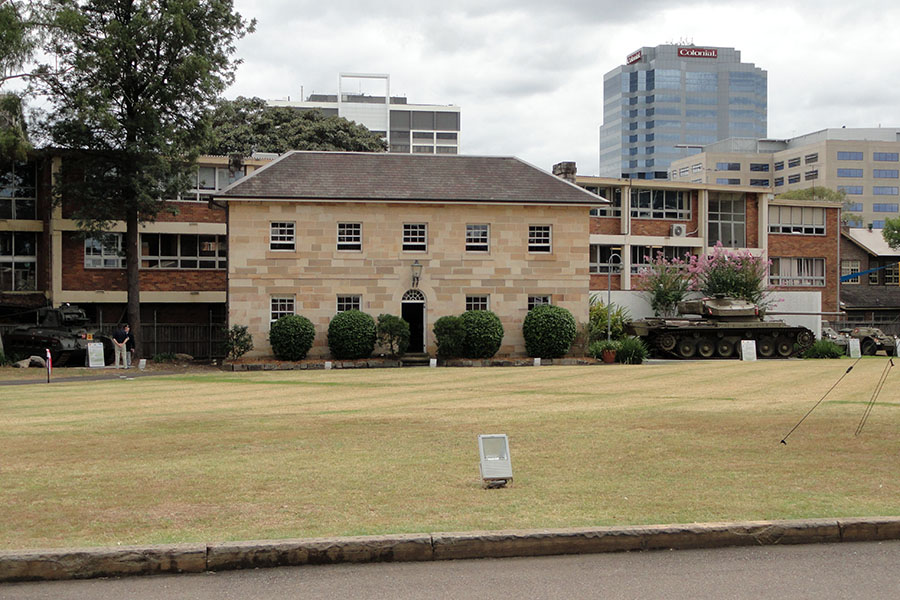

- Location within Sydney Location within Australia
- 33.8168°S 151.0068°E
- Location: Linden House, 2 Smith Street, Parramatta, Sydney, New South Wales, Australia

New South Wales Heritage Register
- Official name: 1st/15th Royal NSW Lancers Memorial Museum Collection
- Type: state heritage (movable / collection)
- Designated: 14 May 2010
- Reference no.: 1824
- Type: Defence Objects (movable)
- Category: Defence

The New South Wales Lancers Memorial Museum is a military museum at Linden House, 2 Smith Street, Parramatta, Sydney, Australia. The museum's collection is heritage-listed, having been added to the New South Wales State Heritage Register on 14 May 2010.

== Museum ==
The 1st/15th Royal NSW Lancers Museum was established at the Parramatta Lancer Barracks in 1958. The main purpose of the museum is to collect and preserve relics, artefacts and records that tell the story of the Royal NSW Lancers, their predecessors (i.e. NSW Cavalry Reserves, Sydney Lancers, NSW Cavalry Regiment, NSW Lancers, 1st Light Horse Regiment AIF, and 1st Armoured Regiment 2nd AIF) and their successors. The museum also collects and preserves relics, artefacts and records of other Light Horse Regiments and the Royal Australian Armoured Corps.

The collection comprises over 7,000 items, including many of international or national heritage significance. It is now the only official military museum in New South Wales or the ACT, committed to restoring and maintaining its fleet of heritage military vehicles in full running order. These include a working example of the first armoured fighting vehicle used by the regiment in WWII, the Bren Gun Carrier. Most young Australian volunteers who were destined to join the new armoured regiments, hurriedly being formed in Australia as the Japanese entered the war and moved to threaten the country, trained on these carriers while waiting for the arrival of Matilda Tanks from England. The heritage vehicle fleet also includes the internationally acclaimed Matilda Tank named ACE, the first tank off the landing craft at Australia's largest ever armoured assault, carried out by the Lancers (then known as the 1st Armoured Regiment (AIF) (RNSWL) at Balikpapan, on the island then known as Borneo, in July 1945. Left to rot in a paddock in the NSW Southern Highlands for over 50 years, when eventually recovered by museum volunteers, the consensus of opinion was that it could never be restored. After six years, the expenditure of $100,000 and over 30,000 volunteer hours, ACE is back to the condition in which its wartime crew would have fought in it, on permanent public display at Lancer Barracks where it can sometimes be heard and seen starting its engines and driving around and available for public events. It has been awarded a coveted National Trust conservation award, and has been described as a unique restoration project representing cutting edge restoration. It is the only British or Commonwealth armoured fighting vehicle to have seen active service in any theatre of World War II, to have been restored to full mobility and returned to its wartime fighting unit, let alone restored by retired volunteers from that unit.

Until the creation of the regular Australian Army in 1948, the regiment was the Vice-Regal Escort, providing the mounted escort for the Governors of NSW and, after Federation, the Governors-General of Australia, on all major public events, such as the opening of the first Parliament of Australia and of the opening of the Sydney Harbour Bridge. The whole collection therefore traces the active, ceremonial and peacetime service history, both at home and overseas, of the 1st/15th Royal NSW Lancers Regiment, from its inception in 1885 through to the present day. The 1st/15th Royal NSW Lancers is Australia's oldest and most highly decorated Regiment.

== Regimental history ==
=== Formation of Regiment and Occupation of Parramatta Barracks ===
The beginnings of the regiment date from 1885 when the then Governor gave approval for the formation of a volunteer cavalry corps in Sydney known as the Sydney Light Horse Volunteers. Within that same year the Sydney Light Horse Volunteers were converted to the Sydney Lancers. The formation of the Sydney Lancers encouraged the formation of other light horse troops in country NSW and by 1886 the cavalry reserves comprised eight troops of light horse. In 1889 the light horse troops were reorganised into an integrated regiment known as the NSW Cavalry Regiment. Historic Parramatta Barracks became the Regimental Headquarters of the NSW Lancers in 1897. The Lancers have occupied the Barracks from 1897 through to the present day and consequently, are nicknamed the Parramatta Lancers. The regiment was granted the title "Royal" in 1935.

=== The Evolution from Horse Mounted Lancers to Modern, Heavy-armoured Vehicles ===
In the years leading up to WWII the cavalry was converted into motorised machine gun regiments and the NSW Lancers were one of the first Regiments to give up their horses. The regiment was armed with Vickers machine guns mounted on an assortment of small, privately owned motor-lorries. The idea of such a unit was totally new and the unit is believed to have been the first of its kind in the Empire. During WWII the regiment was incorporated into the newly formed 3rd Army Tank Brigade and designated as the 1st Australian Army Tank Battalion, later renamed the 1st Australian Armoured Regiment. The 1st Australian Armoured Regiment pioneered the use of the Matilda infantry tank in the jungle and formed part of what is to this day, Australia's largest ever armoured assault at Balikpapan, Borneo in 1945.

=== Present Day ===
Today the regiment operates as light cavalry scouts equipped with light skin scout vehicles. The regiment's mission is to support the 51st Battalion, the Far North Queensland Regiment. 1st/15th Royal NSW Lancers Regiment Headquarters remains the Lancer Barracks at Parramatta.

== Role of the Lancers ==
=== Ceremonial service ===
In 1885 the regiment, then the new formed Sydney Lancers, was designated as the NSW Vice Regal escort, a role the regiment continued to fulfil up until WWII. The regiment's first public appearance as the Vice Regal escort, occurred in 1885 when the regiment escorted the then Governor to farewell the NSW contingent to the Sudan. Other important ceremonial events attended by the regiment include: the opening of State and Federal Parliaments (including inaugural Federal parliament); inauguration of site of new Australian Capital, Canberra; the opening of Sydney Harbour Bridge and the parade for the visit of the Great White Fleet to Australia in 1908. During this event the regiment mounted band followed by the regiment lead the parade in Centennial Park. In addition to ceremonial duties performed at home, detachments of the Lancers travelled to England in 1893 to form part of Queen Victoria's escort for the opening the Imperial Institute. Detachments of the Lancers also formed part of the Queen's escort for the Diamond Jubilee celebrations in England in 1897.

=== Active Service ===
The regiment was the first Colonial and therefore the first Australian troops to see active service in the Boer War (1889-1902). In WWI the regiment fought at Gallipoli as the famed 1st Light Horse and in Sinai and Palestine as part of the Desert Mounted Corps. During WWII the regiment saw active service in the Western Desert, Greece, Crete, New Guinea and Tarakan as the 2/2 Machine Gun Battalion and in New Guinea and Borneo as the 1st Australian Armoured Regiment.

== Naming of the regiment ==
=== Origin of "1st" Designation and Grant of Title 'Royal' ===
As reserve units were not allowed to fight outside Australia, on the outbreak of both WWI and WWII, the Australian Government recruited a special force of volunteers, known respectively as the first and second Australian Imperial Force (AIF) units. In the case of the Lancers their officers and men formed the first ranks of the 1st Light Horse, 1st AIF. At the end of WWI and the disbandment of the AIF units, where possible the AIF units complete with battle honours were effectively folded back into their "parent" Australian Military Force (AMF) unit. After the close of WWI, the regiment which had been designated the 7th Light Horse (NSW Lancers) prior to WWI, was renamed the 1st Light Horse (NSW Lancers). A few years later, in 1921, the regiment was designated the 1st Light Horse Regiment (NSW Lancers). The regiment received the grant of the title "Royal" in 1935 and in the following year Regiment was renamed the 1st Light Horse (Machine Gun) Regiment (Royal NSW Lancers).

At the onset of WWII volunteers from the Lancers formed the 2nd Machine Gun Battalion, 2nd AIF. With the disbandment of AIF troops after the war the AIF unit, now known as the 1st Australian Armoured Tank Battalion (AIF) (Royal NSW Lancers), was folded back into its "parent" Australian Military Force unit the 1st Australian Motor Regiment (Royal NSW Lancers), a designation the regiment received in 1942. Post WWII the regiment was designated the 1st Armoured Regiment (Royal NSW Lancers) in 1948 and then in 1949 the 1st Royal NSW Lancers.

=== Origin of "15th" Designation ===
In 1956 the 15th Light Horse (Northern River Lancers) were disbanded. As the genesis of this regiment was one of the original troops of the NSW Cavalry Reserves, it was decided by military authorities that, like the 1st Light Horse, 1st AIF, the 15th Light Horse would be folded back into its "parent", hence the Lancers current name 1st/15th Royal NSW Lancers.

== Description ==
The Museum is located in the Commonwealth Heritage listed Lancer Barracks precinct, mainland Australia's oldest military barracks. It was built by Governor Macquarie between 1818 and 1820. Its architect, Lt John Watts, was Macquarie's ADC at the time. The items on display to the public, except the Museum's collection of armoured fighting vehicles, are held in "Linden House" an 1820s era Georgian, sandstone building built by the wife of Governor Darling as the first women's school of industry in the colony. One of its subsequent uses was officers' quarters for the Imperial troops stationed at the Barracks. Linden House was relocated to the Lancer Barracks from 31-33 Macquarie Street, Parramatta in 1963, to house the Museum's collection. The doors, windows and internal joinery of Linden House are replicas.

The Royal NSW Lancers Memorial Museum Collection spans the entire 125-year history of the regiment which commenced in 1885 as the first gazetted cavalry unit in the colony. It includes extensive items from WWI and WWII. The Museum also includes one of the best, if not the best Boer War collection in Australia. The collection comprises over 6,000 items, including uniforms, weapons, equipment; flags and banners; photos, photo albums, scrap books, films and videos, map and aerial reconnaissance photos, personal and unit war diaries, regimental nominal rolls, correspondence records, accounts and equipment ledgers, payroll returns and an extensive range of war and peacetime memorabilia. A brief list of some of the most significant items held in the collection are listed below.

As the premier Regiment in NSW, the collection also includes many rare photographs, documents and memorabilia of the regiment's ceremonial role. including visits to England in 1893 and again for Queen Victoria's Jubilee celebrations in 1897, on both occasions the regiment's contingent provided part of the Sovereign's escort. In NSW, as the original Vice Regal escort, the Museum holds rare photographs and memorabilia of such events as the visit of the American Great White Fleet in 1908, the opening of the Sydney Harbour Bridge, the opening of pre Federation Parliaments and the dedication of the site of modern-day Canberra.

A brief list of just some of the significant items held in the collection includes:

- A complete WWI 1st Light Horse uniform with insignia showing the owner was an Anzac veteran, wounded in action with four years of active service;
- An internationally rare captured Bergman MP 18.1 sub-machine gun (c. 1981), a model that was the forerunner of every sub-machine gun developed since that time;

Lt Col McArthur-Onslow's drinking mug which he described as his "bath" while at Gallipoli;

- A complete Light Horse saddle with all weapons and equipment together with a Light Horse pack saddle used when part of the Desert Mounted Corps in Palestine;
- Early aerial reconnaissance photographs of Palestine, together with personal notes on the camera and techniques used by Lt (later Lt Col) Wikner, who was a Liaison Officer flying with an advanced detachment of an RAF Squadron East of the Jordan River;
- The original 2/2nd Machine Gun Battalion flag presented to the battalion in the Western Desert on the formation of the 9th Australian Division;
- The official Battalion photo album of all the initial officers of 2/2nd Machine Gun Battalion, together with their personal records;
- The WW2 medals, including the MC, awarded to Sgt (later Lt) Longhurst before his death in New Guinea;
- One of only 3 surviving Balikpapan Matilda Tanks, which will be the only fully mobile one when restored;
- One of only 3 Covenanter Bridge Layer tanks left in the world, and the only survivor used at Balikpapan;
- A copy of the orders for Operation Oboe 2, the landing at Balikpapan, together with intelligence summaries, aerial photographs and unit war diaries of the action;
- Major (later Major General) GL Lee's personal Boer War diary covering the sea voyage on the SS Kent to South Africa and a day by day account of the Lancer's campaign on the Veldt for the first months of their service. This diary contains the first known versions of five Banjo Patterson Poems, two of which behave been scientifically verified as being in his own hand writing. Patterson accompanied the Lancers to South Africa as war correspondent for the Sydney Morning Herald;
- The personal photograph albums of Captain (later Major Gen) "Fighting Charlie" Cox, who commanded the first half Squadron of Lancers to see action in South Africa, and Major GL Lee. These photographs contain rare photos of the Boer War, which predated the creation of the Australian War Correspondents and Photographers organisation, and include a signed photo of President Kruger of the Transvaal;
- A Boer flag captured at the fall of Bloemfontein;
- The payroll returns for the Lancers fighting in South Africa;
- Major GL Lee's personal notes detailing every Lancer who participated in the Boer War, the major and minor actions each one saw and relevant notes (such as killed in action, contracted entherric fever; etc.);
- A collection of rare Boer War medals, one with six clasps (the maximum possible is eight);
- The personal 1897 Jubilee detachment scrap books of Lt Timothy and Captain Walter Liberty Vernon. Timothy's contains his personal invitation to the Guildhall Jubilee Ball; Vernon's contains the official orders for the Colonial contingents taking part as the Sovereign's escort, together with a map and detailed program of the Spithead Review;
- A tassel from Queen Victoria's personal coach, "souvenired" by Sgt Barraclough of the Lancers detachment;
- The only mobile forge used in the NSW/Australian military, purchased from Germany by Walter Liberty Vernon after he commanded the regiment's Jubilee detachment in England in 1897;
- The 1886 NSW Cavalry Reserve Headquarters correspondence ledger, containing extensive correspondence from Lt. Col. MM MacDonald ("Father of Australian Cavalry") demonstrating the issues confronted and contemporary attitudes towards the establishment of NSW's first cavalry unit.

== Heritage listing ==
The 1st/15th Royal NSW Lancers Memorial Museum Collection is of State heritage significance because it documents the complete and continuous history of Australia's oldest and most highly decorated regiment from its inception through to the present day. The collection interprets major themes in Australia's history, including the role played by Australian troops in the Boer War and the First and Second World Wars.

The collection is also significant because of its relationship to the historic Parramatta Barracks. The Barracks are the oldest surviving mainland military barracks in Australia. The collection is important in the interpretation of the Barracks and it enhances the significance of the place.

The Royal NSW Lancers Memorial Museum Collection has over 50 items identified as being of National significance and some of International significance. It includes significant items relating to:

- The formation and development of a colonial military unit;
- The role played by the regiment in Sydney society;
- The evolution of the regiment and its weaponry, equipment and uniforms from horse mounted lancers to modern, heavy-armoured vehicles;
- The participation of the regiment in important state, national and international occasions and major conflicts, such as WW1 and WW2; and
- The relationship between prominent and influential members of NSW society and the development of the regiment.

The collection also contains the first versions of five poems written by Banjo Paterson during the period he was a war correspondent in South Africa. The poems all show differences, some very extensive, from later published versions. The poems are important for their ability to demonstrate the creative writing process of this renowned Australian Poet.

The collection is significant because it has the potential to provide information, not available from other sources on a range of topics including: the role played by Australian forces in major military conflicts; the evolution of the Australian cavalry; important state, national and international events; the lives and military careers of influential prominent figures in NSW society and the literary work of renowned Australian poet Banjo Paterson.

The collection contains relics, artefacts and documents that bear testimony to the contribution of individual members of the regiment to major Australian conflicts. The significance of the collection to past and present members of the regiment is evidenced by the involvement of serving and retired members of the regiment in the management and running of the Museum: the board of management for the Museum comprises both serving and retired members; and the Museum is staffed by retired Lancers.

The Royal NSW Lancers Memorial Museum Collection is unique as there is no other collection covering the entire 125-year history of Australia's oldest surviving regiment. There are also no other Light Horse or cavalry museums in Australia with as comprehensive collection as the Royal NSW Lancers either in terms of the size and extent of the collection or the periods covered.

1st-15th Royal NSW Lancers Memorial Museum Collection was listed on the New South Wales State Heritage Register on 14 May 2010 having satisfied the following criteria.

The place is important in demonstrating the course, or pattern, of cultural or natural history in New South Wales.

The 1st/15th Royal NSW Lancers Memorial Museum Collection documents the complete and continuous history of Australia's oldest and most highly decorated regiment from its inception, in 1885, through to the present day. The collection interprets major themes in Australian History including the role played by Australian troops in the Boer War and the First and Second World Wars.

The collection includes significant items that relate to: the formation and development of a colonial military unit; the role played by the regiment in Sydney society; the evolution of the regiment and its weaponry, equipment and uniforms from horse mounted lancers to modern, heavy-armoured vehicles; the participation of the regiment in important state, national and international occasions and major conflicts; and the relationship between prominent and influential members of NSW society and the development of the regiment.

The Royal NSW Lancers Memorial Museum Collection is also significant because of its relationship to historic Parramatta Barracks. The Lancers' occupation of the barracks commenced in 1893 and continues to this day. The collection is important in the interpretation of the Barracks and it enhances the significance of the place.

The place has a strong or special association with a person, or group of persons, of importance of cultural or natural history of New South Wales's history.

The collection is of State heritage significance as it contains items associated with members of the regiment who were also prominent and influential leaders in NSW society including:

- Sir James Burns businessman, shipowner, philanthropist, politician and soldier;
- Walter Liberty Vernon NSW Government Architect;
- Sir John Sulman architect and town planner;
- Sir John Northcott first Australian-born and one of the longest-serving governors of NSW;
- Lieutenant-Colonel James McMahon, businessman, politician and sportsman; and
- Major General James Macarthur-Onslow

The collection also contains the first known versions of five poems written by renowned Australian Poet Banjo Paterson. Paterson accompanied the Lancers to South Africa as a war correspondent for the Sydney Morning Herald. Two of the poems have been scientifically verified as being in his own hand writing. One of the poems "the Reveille" was written specifically about the Lancers and its service with the British cavalry.

The place is important in demonstrating aesthetic characteristics and/or a high degree of creative or technical achievement in New South Wales.

The collection is of State significance as it shows the evolution of the uniforms, weaponry and equipment of the Australian cavalry, from horses and lances through to early mechanisation and the introduction of heavy armoured vehicles.

The collection is also significant for its ability to demonstrate the creative writing process of renowned Australian Poet Banjo Paterson. The collection contains first versions of 5 Banjo Paterson poems written by Paterson during the period he was a war correspondent in South Africa.. The poems all show differences, some very extensive, from later published versions.

The place has strong or special association with a particular community or cultural group in New South Wales for social, cultural or spiritual reasons.

The collection contains relics, artefacts and documents that trace the history of the 1st/15th Royal NSW Lancer Regiment and bear testimony to the contribution of individual members of the regiment to major Australian conflicts. The significance of the collection to past and present members of the regiment is evidenced by the involvement of serving and retired members of the regiment in the management and running of the Museum: the board of management for the Museum comprises both serving and retired members; and the Museum is staffed by retired Lancers.

The place has potential to yield information that will contribute to an understanding of the cultural or natural history of New South Wales.

The collection is of State heritage significance as it has the potential to provide information, not available from other sources, on the following subjects:

- the role played by Australian forces in major military conflicts;
- the development of Australian cavalry uniforms, equipment, weapons, organisation and administration;
- state and national events such as the visit of the Great White Fleet in 1908;
- the lives and military careers of influential and prominent figures in New South Wales society;
- the literary work of renowned Australian poet Banjo Patterson.

The place possesses uncommon, rare or endangered aspects of the cultural or natural history of New South Wales.

The Royal NSW Lancers Memorial Museum Collection is unique as there is no other collection covering the entire 125-year history of Australia's oldest surviving regiment. There are also no other Light Horse or cavalry museums in Australia with as comprehensive collection as the Royal NSW Lancers either in terms of the size and extent of the collection or the periods covered.

The collection includes over 50 items identified as being of National significance and some of International significance including:

- Rare photographs, documents and memorabilia relating to important ceremonies the 1st/15th Regiment participated in, including events such as: the visit of the Great White Fleet in 1908; the opening of the Sydney Harbour Bridge; the opening of pre Federation Parliaments; and the dedication of site of modern-day Canberra;
- Rare photographs, documents and memorabilia relating to the regiment's participation in major conflicts including: rare photographs of the Boer War and a collection of rare Boer war medals;
- Rare examples of Australian military equipment such as: the only mobile forge used in the NSW/Australian military, 1 of 3 surviving Balikpapan Matilda Tanks, 1 of 3 Covenanter Bridge Layer Tanks in the world and the only surviving Bridgelayer used at Balikpapan.

Internationally rare Bergaman MP 18.1 sub-machine gun, the forerunner of all subsequent machine guns;

- Rare and exceptional examples of the earliest NSW ceremonial cavalry uniforms and accoutrements, many of them the personal uniforms of prominent members of NSW Society;
- Rare ceremonial flags, pennants and the original mounted side drums and drapes for the regiment band's first drum horse;
- Rare turn of the 20th Century illuminated Regimental nominal roles of the three Regiments making up the 1st Light Horse Brigade at the formation of the Commonwealth military forces; and
- The first version of five Banjo Patterson poems two of which have been scientifically verified as being in his own handwriting.

== See also ==
- Military history of Australia
