= Liquid Architecture =

Australian non-profit art organisation

Liquid Architecture Sound Inc
- Founded: 1999
- Headquarters: 104/35 Johnston Street, Collingwood, Victoria, Australia
- Key people: Ronen Jafari (Executive Direction, CEO), Rohan Rebeiro (Artistic Director)
- Website: liquidarchitecture.org.au

Liquid Architecture is an Australian non-profit art organisation with a focus on experimental music, sonic art, contemporary performance, pedagogy and discourse based in Naarm/Melbourne.

== History ==
Liquid Architecture was founded by School of Art students and staff at the Royal Melbourne Institute of Technology in 1999, initially as a showcase for their own work and that of peers. Over the following fifteen years, under the stewardship of founding Director Nat Bates, Liquid Architecture grew from a local event into a yearly touring festival of experimental and avant-garde music and sound art, featuring artists from around the world, with programs in Melbourne, Sydney, Brisbane, Perth and regional locations around Australia. Notable visiting artists during the period included Bernard Parmegiani, Tony Conrad, and Pauline Oliveros.

In 2014, with the injection of government funding from the Australia Council for the Arts and Creative Victoria, and the appointment of Joel Stern and Danni Zuvela as Artistic co-directors, Liquid Architecture dissolved its annual festival, instituting a year-round, curatorial program of public events, programs and research initiatives with an interdisciplinary focus.

Key projects from 2014 onwards include the establishment of the Polyphonic Social festival, research programs exploring sound and feminism, non-human listening, and audio surveillance, international touring programs in Singapore and Taiwan, collaborations with refugees held in offshore immigration detention, and the establishment of Liquid Architecture's online journal Disclaimer.

In 2020, Liquid Architecture became a founding tenant organisation of the Collingwood Yards cultural precinct in Melbourne, alongside peer organisations including West Space and Bus Projects. From this base at Collingwood Yards, Liquid Architecture's program is developed alongside a network of artists, curators and producers.

Today, Liquid Architecture's artistic program includes the monthly experimental performance series Mono-Poly, the regular concert forum Ritual Community Music, and online journal, Disclaimer.

== Artistic Directors ==
- Nat Bates (2000–2012)
- Philip Samartzis (2012–2013)
- Danni Zuvela (2013–2019)
- Joel Stern (2013–2022)
- Lucrecia Quintanilla (2022–2024)
- Kristi Monfries (2022–2025)
- Rohan Rebeiro (2026-)
