= Museum of Chinese in Australia =

History museum in Sydney, New South Wales

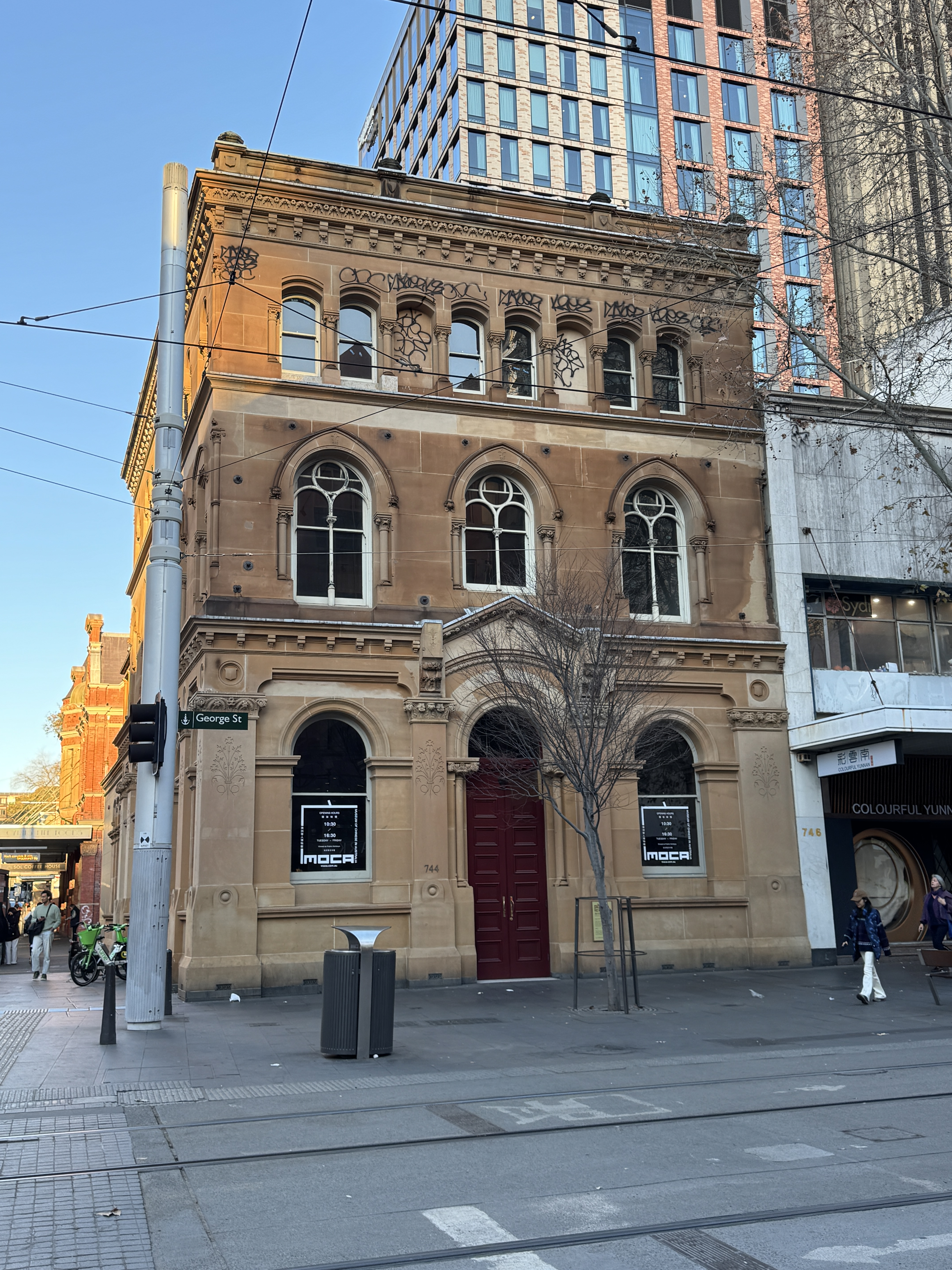
- Established: 2026
- Location: 744 George Street, Haymarket, Sydney, New South Wales, Australia
- Coordinates: 33.8799089°S 151.2055113°E
- Type: History museum
- Public transit access: Central; Capitol Square; Haymarket
- Website: moca.com.au

The Museum of Chinese in Australia (MOCA) is a museum dedicated to Chinese Australian history and heritage. It is housed in the heritage-listed former Haymarket Library in Sydney's Chinatown and officially opened on 22 February 2026.

== History ==
The idea for the museum took shape in 2019. John Yu was its founding chair, and Stephen FitzGerald was one of its founding directors.

Prime Minister Anthony Albanese and Sydney Lord Mayor Clover Moore officiated at the opening ceremony on 22 February 2026, during Chinese New Year. The ground-floor exhibition was open at the launch while work on the upper floors continued.

== Exhibitions ==
The museum's inaugural exhibition, The Merchants of Haymarket: Putting Sydney’s Chinatown on the Map, was curated by Shuxia Chen. Through historical photographs, documents and family histories, it traces how Chinese merchants helped establish Sydney's Chinatown in Haymarket in the late nineteenth and early twentieth centuries. It examines how their businesses developed ties across Asia during the era of the White Australia policy.
