= Museums and Collections of Macquarie University =

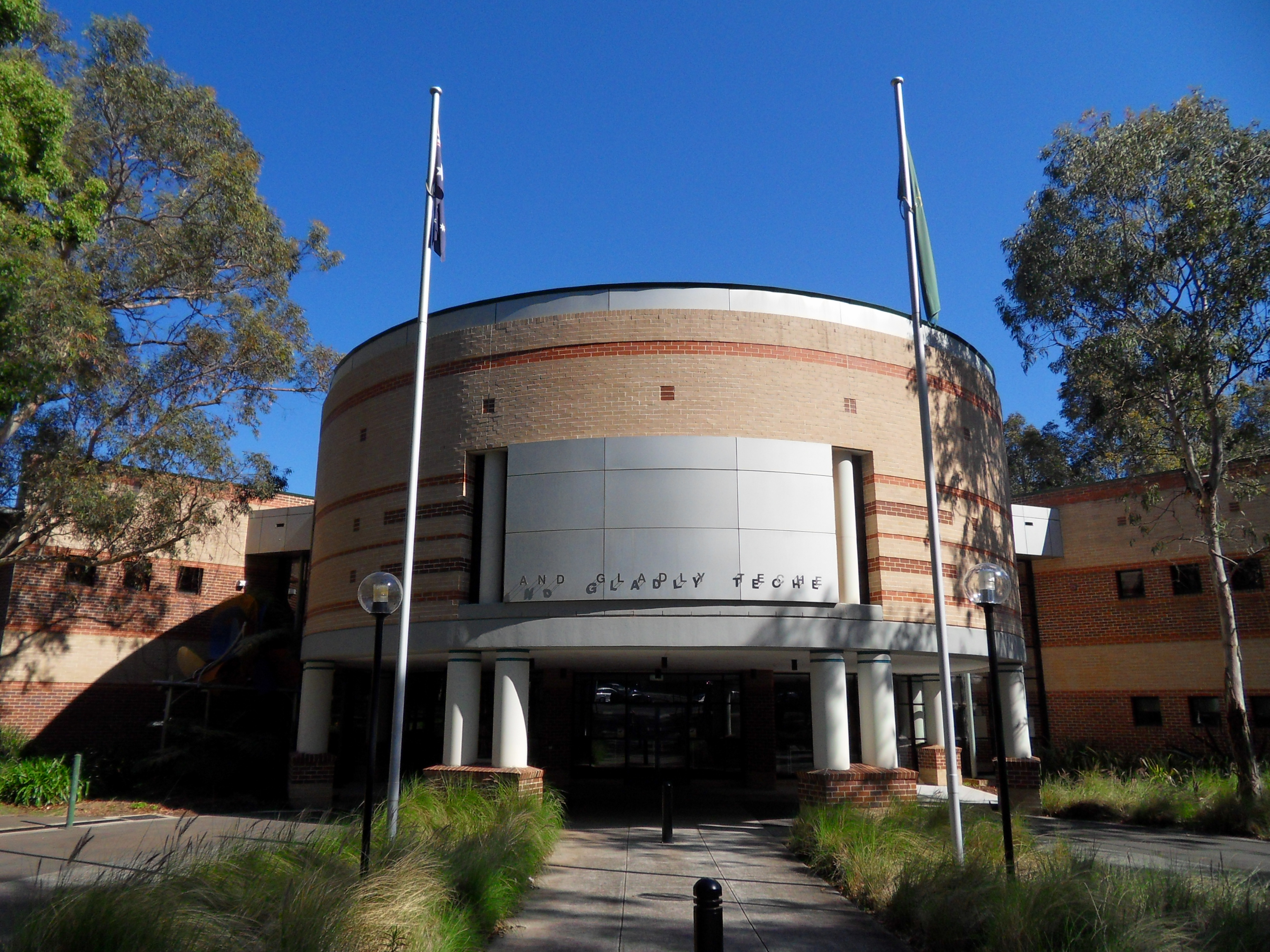
Building containing the Macquarie University Art Gallery

Macquarie University, contains nine museums, galleries and collections on its main North Ryde campus, each focusing on various historical, scientific or artistic interests. All are open to the public and offer educational programs for students at primary, secondary and tertiary levels.

== Galleries and collections ==
=== The Macquarie University Art Gallery and Collections ===
The Macquarie University Art Collection was established in 1967 and since then the collection has developed either through acquisition or donation of artworks that reflect cultural and critical values of importance to Australian society. The Art Collection encompasses modernist works (Australian and International) and emphasises contemporary Australian art practice. In 1974, the renowned Sydney art dealer Rudy Komon donated the first major painting by the artist Leonard French to the university, the work titled The Myth remains a focus on the 3rd level of the University Library. The collection comprises a range of media from painting, photography, video, prints and drawings to glassware, ceramics and textiles and all artworks are displayed throughout the campus.

The Macquarie University Art Gallery, located in building E11A has been in operation since 1999, and focuses on providing a changing exhibition program. The gallery contains an extensive collection of major post-1960s Australian artworks including those on loan from private collectors, as well as representative works by leading artists which have been purchased by, or donated to, the university. The collection includes a wide-ranging selection of indigenous artworks. Exhibitions are developed that reflect a multi disciplinary style to include aspects of science, history, media and culture that are often linked with teaching and research at the university. The University Art Gallery delivers a wide range of public programs in association with each exhibition that include artists, curator's talks, seminars, forums, workshops, poetry readings, dance and music.

=== Macquarie University Sculpture Park ===
Macquarie University Sculpture Park was established in 1992, founded by sculptor, Dr Errol Bruce Davis, OAM. The university's sculpture collection is exhibited across the entire campus, and focuses upon works by contemporary Australian sculptors with some international sculptors featured also. The collection aims to show a variety of styles, materials and techniques showing works in sandstone, limestone, concrete, steel, stainless steel, painted steel, bronze, copper and ceramics. At close to 100 sculptures on display, it is the largest park of its kind in the Southern Hemisphere. Twilight evening tours for the public are offered in November and December and focus on a different section of the campus per week. The collection has recently been divided up into four distinct walks for visitors – Western Walk, Central Circuit, Eastern Walk and Lakeside Walk.

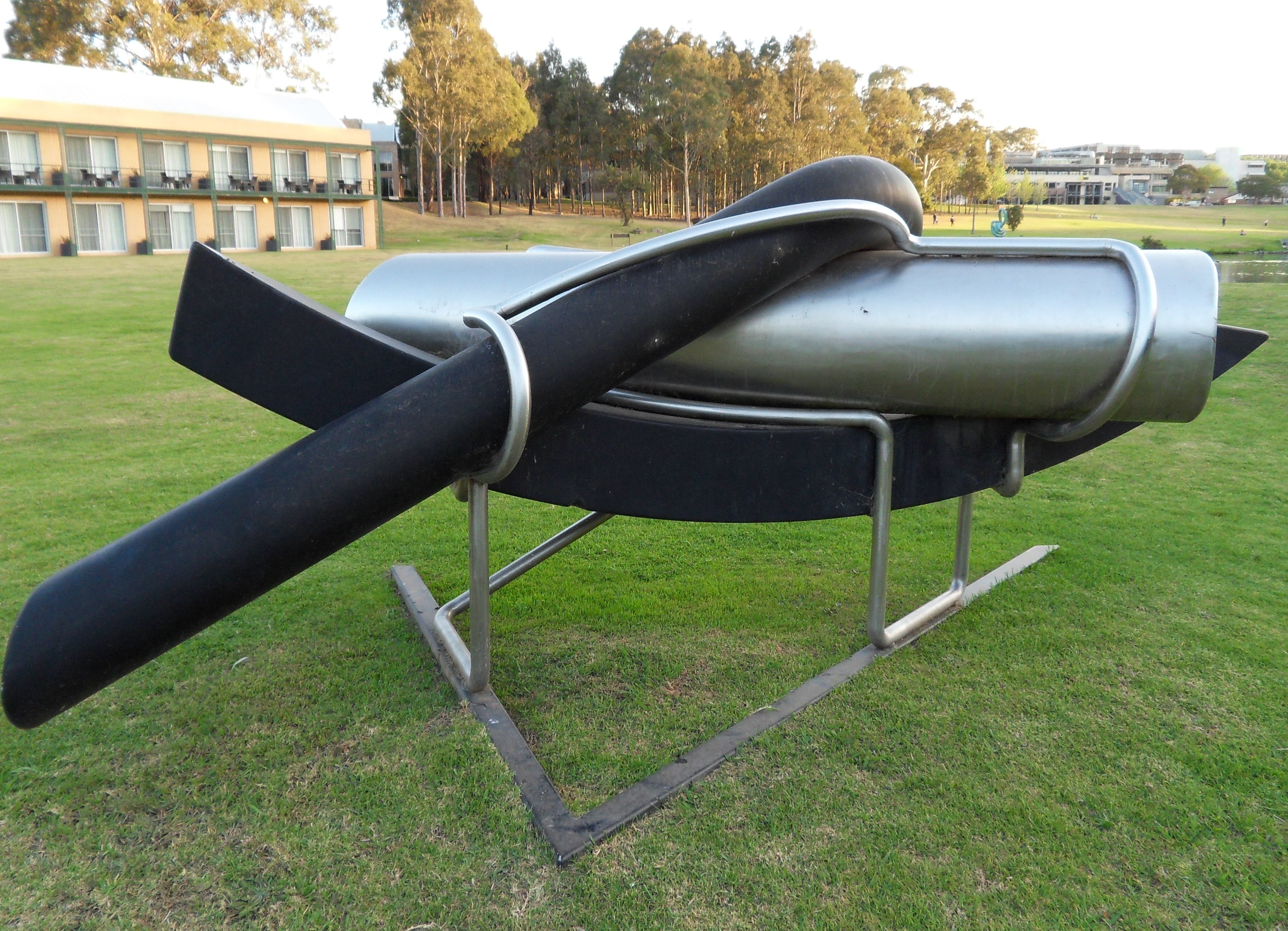
Nigel Harrison's Autonomy - Near MGSM hotel

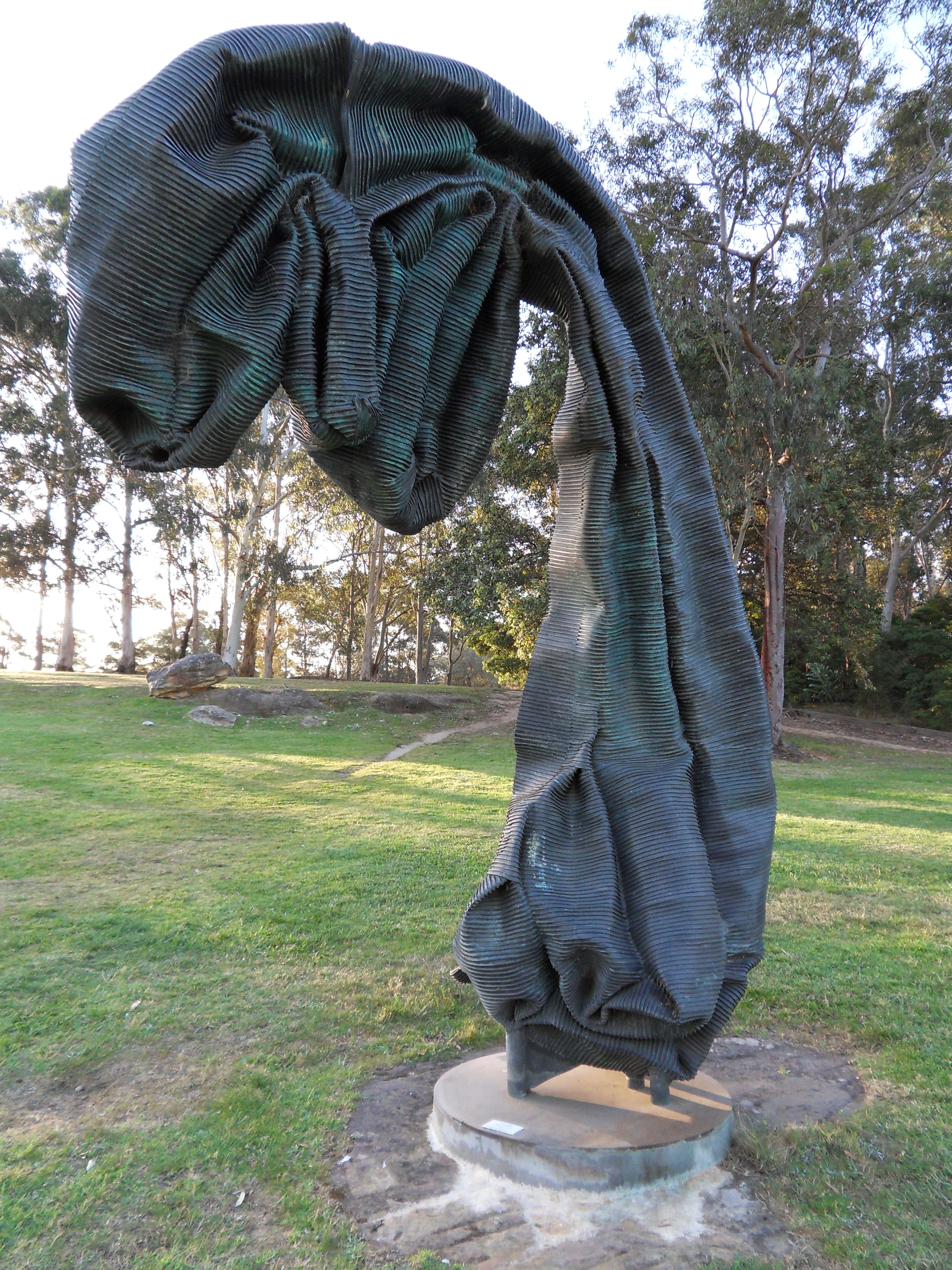
Andrew Rogers' Labile - North side of lake

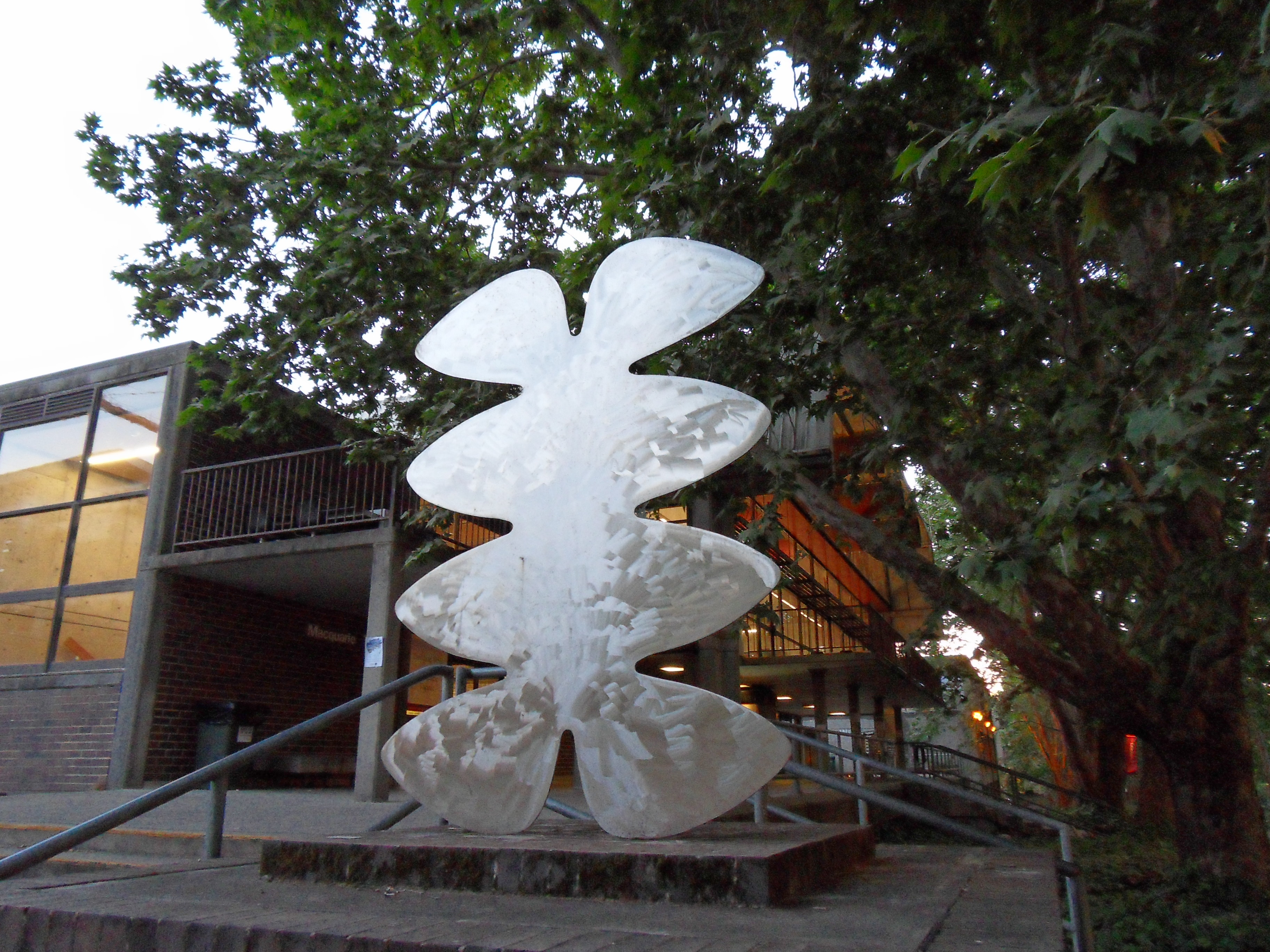
Christopher Hodges' Mira Mira - Corner of stairway to Macquarie Theatre

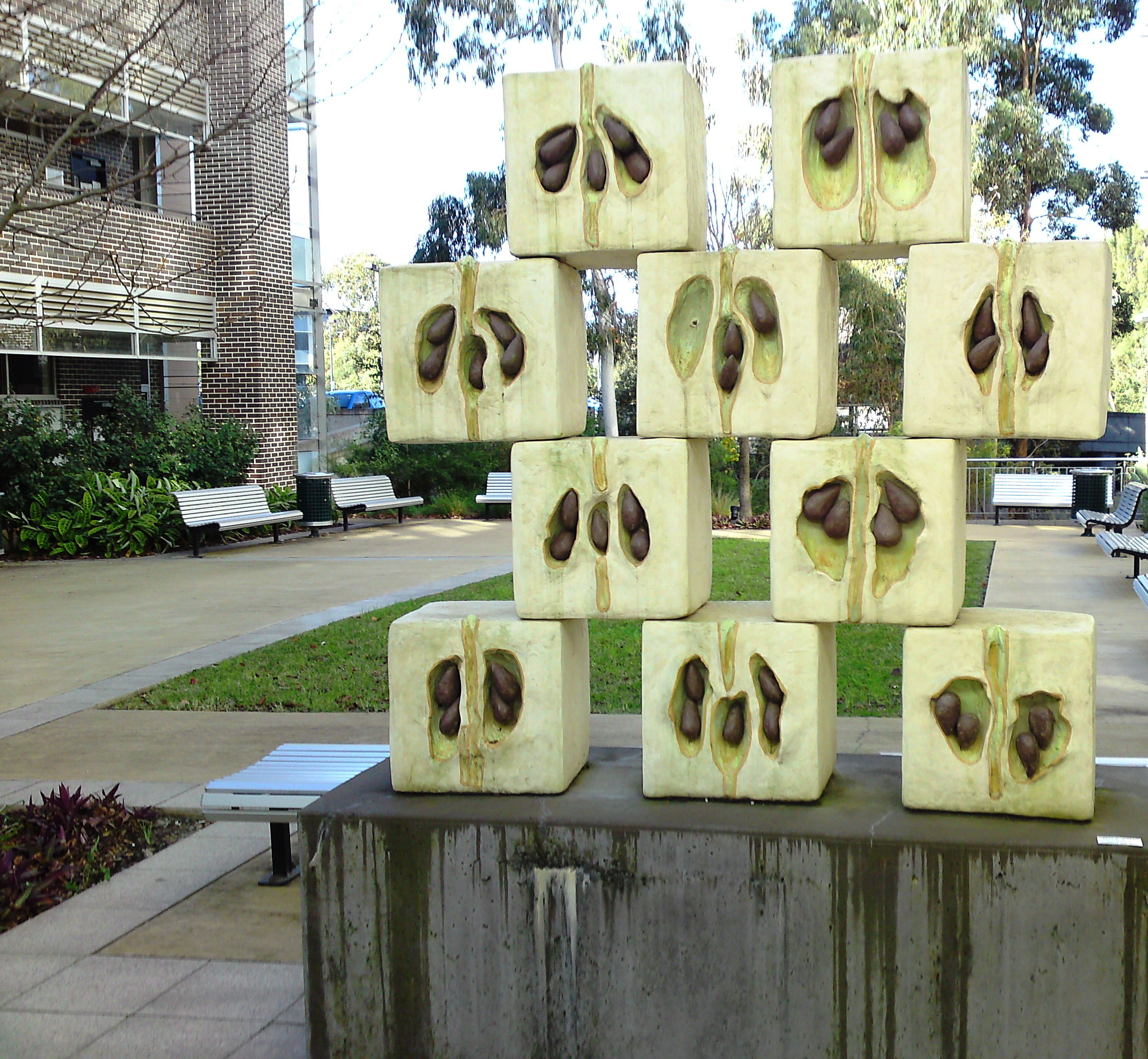

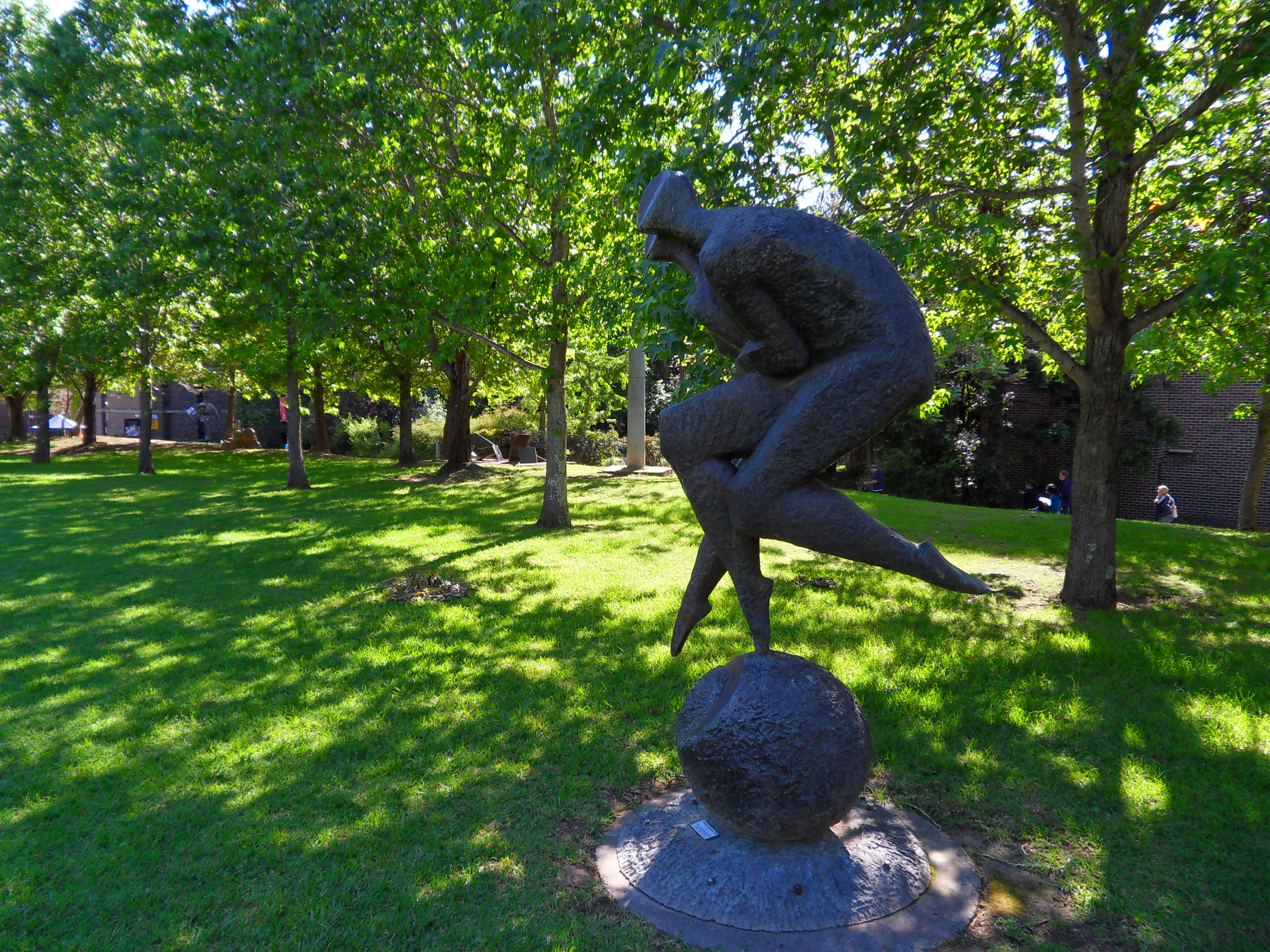
Larissa Smagarinsky's Together Through Time

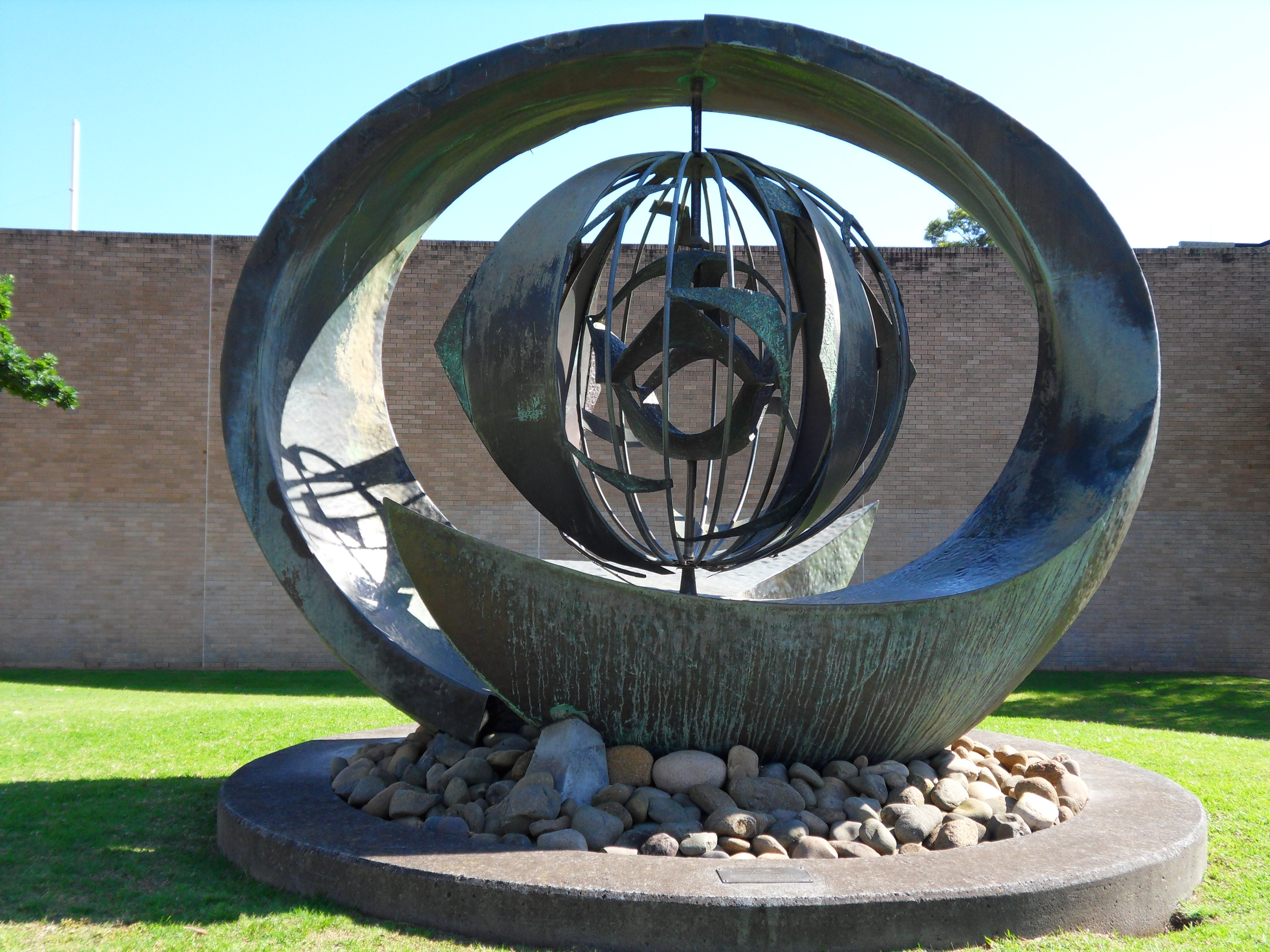

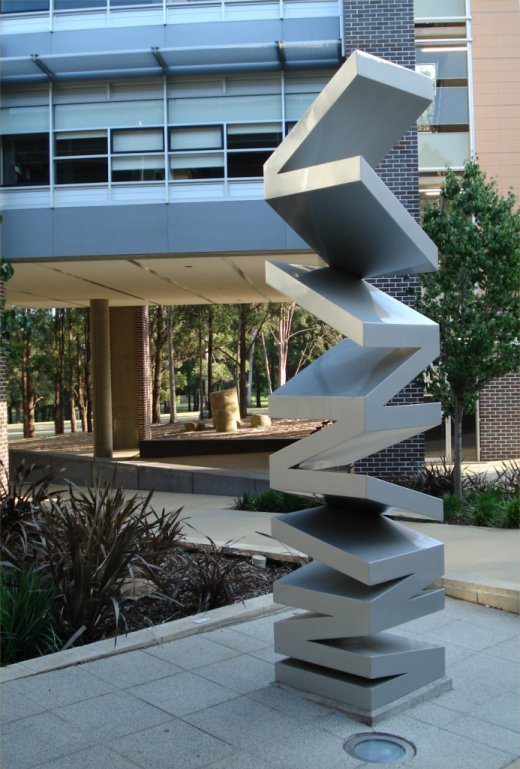

=== The Gale History Museum at Macquarie University ===
The Gale History Museum (GHM) is located on the ground floor of 25C Wally's Walk. Opening in 2021, the Gale History Museum holds over 18,000 objects spanning over 5000 years of history and from over five continents.

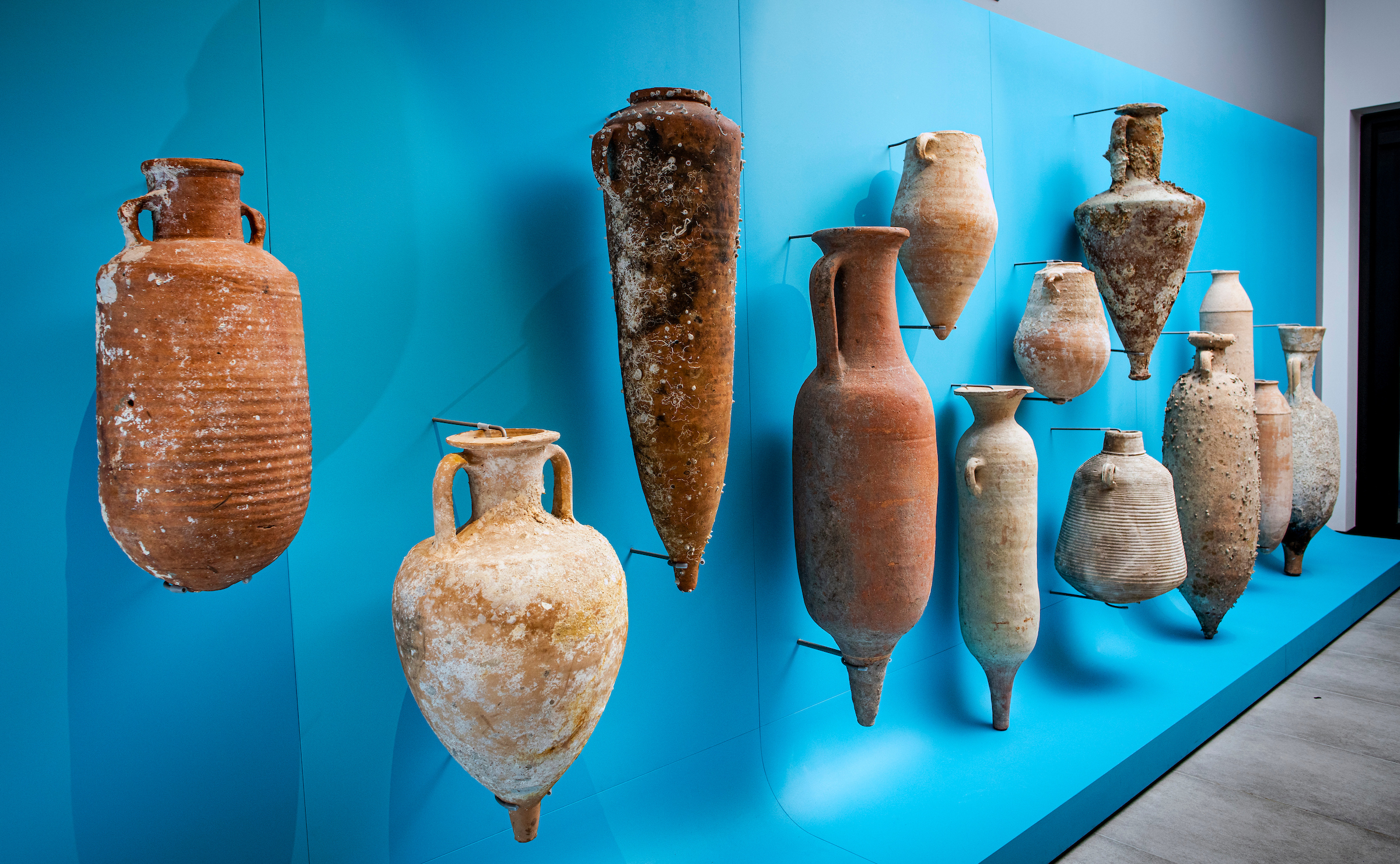
The Amphorae Wall at the Gale History Museum

The GHM's collections include material from:

1. Ancient Egypt, from the Pre-Dynastic to the Graeco-Roman period.
2. Ancient Greek culture, from Minoan and Mycenaean material to the Hellenistic period.
3. Ancient Roman culture, from the Villanovan and Etruscan periods to the fifth century CE.
4. Ancient Cyprus, from Early Cypriot to the Late Iron Ages.
5. Ancient Near East including Israel and Mesopotamia, from the early third millennium BCE to the Late Iron Age.
6. Indus Valley including a significant collection of material from a Bronze Age civilization located on the present day border of Pakistan and Afghanistan.
7. White Hart Inn at Windsor, New South Wales- illustrating Sydney's expansion in the 19th Century, before the advent of the railway.
8. Wartime Australia
9. Australian Immigration post-war to the 1970s
10. Aboriginal and Torres Strait Islander nations
11. Papua New Guinea
