= Byron Bay Film Festival =

Film festival in Australia

Coordinates: 28°32′26″S 153°32′57″E

Byron Bay International Film Festival (BBFF)
- Genre: All
- Dates: Mid Australian Spring
- Locations: Byron Bay, Australia
- Years active: 2006–present
- Website: www.bbff.com.au

The Byron Bay Film Festival (BBFF) is a popular AACTA Awards accredited independent awards-based film event held in the late Australian summer at the Palace Cinemas, in the coastal town of Byron Bay, Brunswick Picture House in Brunswick Heads and Lennox Head Cultural Centre in Lennox Head.

The festival was established in 2005 by the then Byron Community & Cultural Centre Venue Manager Greg Aitken; local Byron Bay filmmakers David Warth, John Abegg, Vera Wasowski and current Co-Director Osvaldo Alfaro. In late 2008 the festival changed its name to the Byron Bay International Film Festival but still continues to go by the acronymized BBFF as it has done previously.

== Award categories ==
Awards are given to the winners of the following categories:

- Best Film
- Best Dramatic Feature
- Best Documentary
- Best Cinematography
- Best Surf Film
- Best Environmental Film
- Best Short Film
- Best Young Australian Filmmaker
- Best Byron Bay Film
- Best Experimental Film
- Best Animation
- Best Music Video
- Best CinematicVR Experience
- Best Interactive VR Experience
- Byron Bay International Screenplay Competition

== Co_Lab_Create ==
Where Australia's XR Community Connects

Byron Bay Film Festival organises a program of films, a weekend of events, workshops and masterclasses specifically aimed at the growing Virtual Reality (VR)/ Augmented Reality (AR) sectors and the industries that have helped drive the creation of this medium – Venture Capital, Gaming, Film & VFX.

== Festival presentations ==
=== BBFF06 ===
The first festival ran in early 2006 and screened 55 Australian films from 18–25 January.

=== BBFF07 ===
The 2007 Byron Bay Film Festival was the first to allow international entries and ran from 9–17 February, during which 100 films from 24 countries were screened.

=== BBFF08 ===
The 2008 Byron Bay Film Festival also ran for nine days from 29 February to 8 March 2008 during which 152 films from 34 countries were screened. The Indian-Malaysian entry Laya Project won the Best Film award on the final night of the 2008 festival. It was directed by Harold Monfils.

=== BBFF09/10 ===
The nine-day festival was not held during 2009. In Brisbane for Earth Day 5 June 2009 BBFF presented 2 Best of BBFF Sessions at Greenfest 09. The next festival ran from 5–13 March 2010.

=== BBFF2011 ===
The festival ran from March 4 to 13 in 2011, expanding to 10 days and also screening in neighbouring Lismore.

=== BBFF2012 ===
The 2012 Byron Bay International Film Festival ran from March 2 to 11 at five venues across Byron Bay, Lismore and Murwillumbah. The program included the inaugural Full Moon Cinema screening.

=== BBFF2013 ===
The 7th Byron Bay International Film Festival was held from March 1 to 10 2013 and screened 222 films in 55 sessions from 42 countries. 13 films had their world premiere and 122 had an Australian premiere. South African film, Otelo Burning, directed by Sara Blecher, was the first in the festival's history to collect a hat trick of awards, including Best Film, Best Dramatic Feature and Best Surf Film.

=== BBFF2014 ===
The 8th Byron Bay International Film Festival was held between 28 February and 9 March 2014. It screened 222 films from 36 countries. 43 films had their world premiere and 102 had an Australian premiere. Opening Night film, When My Sorrow Died: The Legend of Armen Ra And The Theremin received a standing ovation and collected the Best Film and Best Documentary Awards.

In May 2014, for the first time Byron Bay International Film Festival collaborated with Vivid Sydney, presenting the workshop "Strategies For A Successful Sea Change", in which it sought to demonstrate how creative talent can forge their career from the Northern Rivers of NSW. At the Vivid Sydney awards, the festival received one of only two special commendations from the NSW state government as a NSW Emerging Creative Talent.

=== BBFF2015 ===
The 9th Byron Bay International Film Festival was held between 6 and 15 March 2015. Frackman picked up Best Film and Best Environmental Film at the 2015 Byron Bay International Film Festival.

=== BBFF2016 ===
In 2016 the festival switched their dates to the Australian spring - with the 10th Byron Bay International Film Festival held Oct 14th to 23rd, while the festival had been introducing Virtual Reality to attending filmmakers since 2013 BBFF2016 marked the first official introduction of Virtual Reality within the program. Two VR/AR/MR focused weekends top and tailed the festival - on the Opening Weekend BBFF presented Co_Lab_Create_v001 - a weekend think-tank aimed at VR/AR Creators whilst the closing weekend featured Ncube8 - which was an introductory weekend of workshops, panels and demonstrations aimed at filmmakers and the public.

=== BBFF2017 ===
The 11th edition of the Byron Bay International Film Festival was held between 6 and 15 October 2017, with fifteen international premieres, and eighty Australian premieres.

- Best Documentary Film Award : 'City of Joy' directed by Madeleine Gavin
- Best Environmental Film Award : 'Blue' directed by Karina Holden
- Best Music Video : 'Love' is a lonely dancer by Antony & Cleopatra, directed by Alan Masferrer
- Best Short Film Award : 'Uncanny Valley' directed by Federico Heller
- Best Surfing Film : the feature documentary 'Heavy Water' by acclaimed surf filmmaker Michael Oblowitz.

=== BBFF2018 ===
The 12th Byron Bay Film Festival was held in October, during this edition 175 films were selected.

2018 Awards by categories :

- Best Film Award : 'Women At War' directed by Bebedikt Erlingsson
- Best Animation Award : 'Bravure' directed by Donato Sansone
- Best Documentary Award : 'Backtrack boys’ directed by Catherine Scott
- Best Environmental Film Award : 'Skarkwater Extinction’ directed by Rob Stewart
- Best Music Video Award : 'Tied Up Right Now’
- Best Short Film Award : ‘Telephone’ directed by Alistair Cheyne
- Best Surf Film Award : 'Big Wata' directed by Gugi Van Der Velden
- Best CinematicVR Experience Award : 'I saw the future’ directed by François Vautier

=== BBFF2019 ===
BBFF 13th edition took place between the 18 and 27 October 2019.

=== BBFF2020 ===
The 14th BBFF was held from 23 October to 1 November 2020, as a Special Edition Festival adhering to covid restrictions. This special edition featured over 30 sessions, highlighting 52 films and included special red carpet premieres and a key talk with Jack Thompson, Wayne Blair and Pauline Clague.

=== BBFF2021 ===
Another Special Edition Festival was held in December 2021 with the Opening Night being held in Lennox Head Cultural Centre, and limited screenings at Palace Byron Bay. The 2021 Special Edition was scaled down as a covid response, featuring 22 films screening at 11 sessions.

== Sources ==
- Byron Bay film festival fights for international recognition by Barnaby Smith (ABC News, 25 February 2014)
- Surf flicks breaking stereotypes at Byron Bay Film Festival by Margaret Burin (ABC News, 3 March February 2014)
- Monfilsbox
