= Jess Scully =

Australian curator, author, and politician

- Born: 1980 or 1981 (age 44–45); Liverpool, New South Wales
- Occupation(s): Curator, author, politician
- Notable work: Glimpses of Utopia

Councillor, City of Sydney Council
- In office 2016–2023

Deputy Lord Mayor, City of Sydney
- In office 2019–2022
- Website: www.jessscully.com

Jess Scully is a curator, author, and local politician in Australia. She has served as a Councillor on the City of Sydney Council from 2016 to 2023, including as Deputy Lord Mayor of Sydney from 2019 to 2022. She is the founding director of the Vivid Ideas program within the Vivid Sydney festival, and her book, Glimpses of Utopia: Real Ideas for a Fairer World, was published in 2020.

== Early life and education ==
Scully was born in 1980 or 1981 in Liverpool, New South Wales, and spent her early childhood in Bossley Park. She has one sister and is the daughter of emigrant parents, with her father from Bangalore and her mother from Chile. Her father became a furniture salesperson, and her mother an interior decorator. Her mother left Chile for Australia with her parents after the 1973 Chilean coup d'état.

Scully attended primary school in Chile when her family moved to Chile for two years in the 1990s, until her family returned to Sydney. Scully later attended Hurlstone Agricultural College and then University of Technology Sydney, where she studied law and journalism.

== Curatorial career ==
Scully and several others began Creative Sydney in 2009 as a series of talks in the annual Vivid Sydney festival, which was incorporated into Vivid Sydney as the larger program Vivid Ideas in 2012. Scully became the founding director of Vivid Ideas, and her curation included hundreds of events, workshops, and speakers from business and creative sectors. Scully has also worked as a curator for TEDxSydney.

== Political career ==
Scully became interested in politics after working in the creative sector for about ten years, including projects such as Vivid Ideas and the Qantas Spirit Of Youth Awards. She admired Lord Mayor of Sydney Clover Moore's work and accepted the opportunity to become part of Moore's team. She was elected to the City of Sydney Council in 2016, and subsequently elected Deputy Lord Mayor of Sydney three years later.

During her time as Deputy Lord Mayor, she successfully moved the council to investigate the development of community wealth building policies. She also became a chair of the Nightlife and Creative Sector Advisory Panel. In addition, she helped simplify the law that allowed street art to be drawn on buildings provided the owner gives consent, without having to submit a development application. She also set up a mailing list called "YIMBY Squad" for supporters of community development proposals. "YIMBY" is an acronym for "Yes, in my backyard" and related to the YIMBY movement.

Scully announced her resignation from the City of Sydney Council in March 2023, and discussed the challenges of balancing motherhood, expecting her second child, while working part-time as a World Bank consultant, and having parental leave unavailable for her part-time councillor role, with the councillor work typically requiring more than forty hours a week. Her departure suggested that Moore was unlikely to face a suitable successor in the next election.

== Glimpses of Utopia ==
In 2020, her book, Glimpses of Utopia: Real Ideas for a Fairer World, was published by Pantera Press. Good Reading gave the book 5 stars and in a review, described it as "arresting from the very first sentence: 'What if the future we need is vastly different to the future we've been told we want?'" In a review for Acuity, Paul Robinson writes, "Scully examines organisations and people that are testing the alternatives," and "These are people embracing new ideas rather than patching tired systems no longer fit for purpose. Inspiring." Genevieve Barlow writes in The Weekly Times, "There are examples of fairer work places, where workers share profits, democracies where decision making is truly democratised and economies, including local ones, gone circular by people buying and consuming goods made where they live. The book shows hope is not dead by a long shot."

According to Fiona Capp in a review for the Sydney Morning Herald, "Scully casts a wide net to find inspiring working models. She looks to citizens' councils in Iceland, the rise of worker-owned businesses in Argentina, and not-for-profit public banking initiatives in the US, among many other creative, community-driven responses to political, institutional and market failures." In a review for The Canberra Times, Mark Thomas writes, "If the book occasionally reads like an inspirational talk, that too its fitting for an author who pioneered a festival where innovation and iconoclasm have been prized (Vivid Ideas)."

== Personal life ==
Scully is married to Pat Armstrong, who is a systems designer. Scully has one daughter, and as of 2023, is expecting another child. She is fluent in Spanish.
