= EarthSync =

Music Company

- Founded: 2005
- Genre: World Music
- Country of origin: India
- Location: Chennai
- Official website: http://www.earthsync.com

EarthSync is a record label and audio-visual production company in Chennai, South India. As a world music record label, EarthSync works with "roots music through which cultures express themselves across time". The EarthSync CDs and DVDs feature traditional music recorded across Asia, often fused with other traditional music styles from, for example, the Middle East. Electronics are also regularly included in the musical mix.

EarthSync also produces world music visual projects to document rare music performances in native locations. Their Laya Project is a "personal and collective musical tribute to the resilience of the human spirit", and is dedicated to the survivors of 26 December 2004 Asian tsunami. A team of sound engineers and camera men took a two-year journey through six tsunami-affected countries, India, Indonesia, Sri Lanka, Thailand, Maldives and Myanmar, and recorded film footage and music with the local musicians. The film does not feature much on the tsunami itself, but rather records the beauty of the local people, their countries and music.

Laya Project won various awards (Founder's Choice Award at the New York International Independent Film and Video Festival, Best Film Award at the Byron Bay Film Festival, Special Juror's Choice Award at Zanzibar International Film Festival in Tanzania and the Audience Award at Imaginaria Film Festival in Italy) and is being screened at international film festivals in places such as Los Angeles, St. Petersburg, Tel Aviv, Mumbai and Kuala Lumpur. It is also being broadcast worldwide on the National Geographic Channel.

EarthSync has produced six albums to its fame; Laya Project, Nagore Sessions, Voice Over The Bridge, Business Class Refugees, Shoshan & A New Day - Laya Project Remixed
