= Tourism in Sydney =

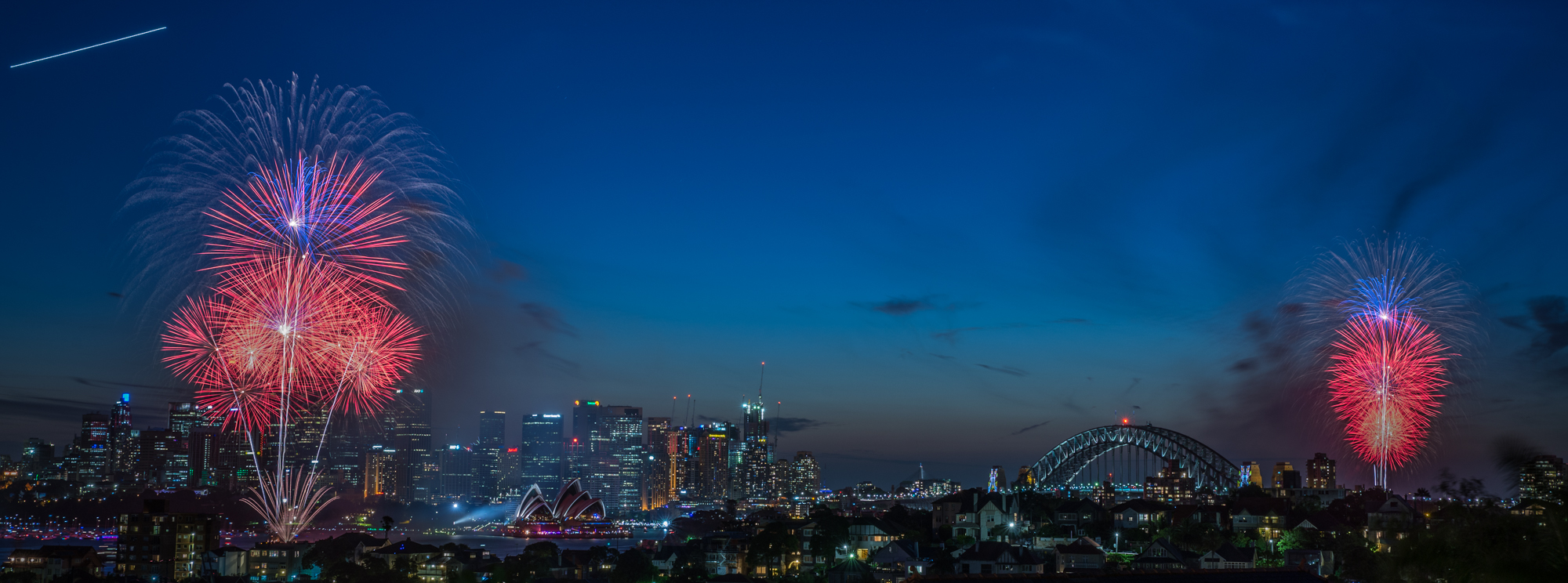
The Sydney New Year's Eve fireworks attracts more than 1.5 million visitors to Sydney Harbour each year.

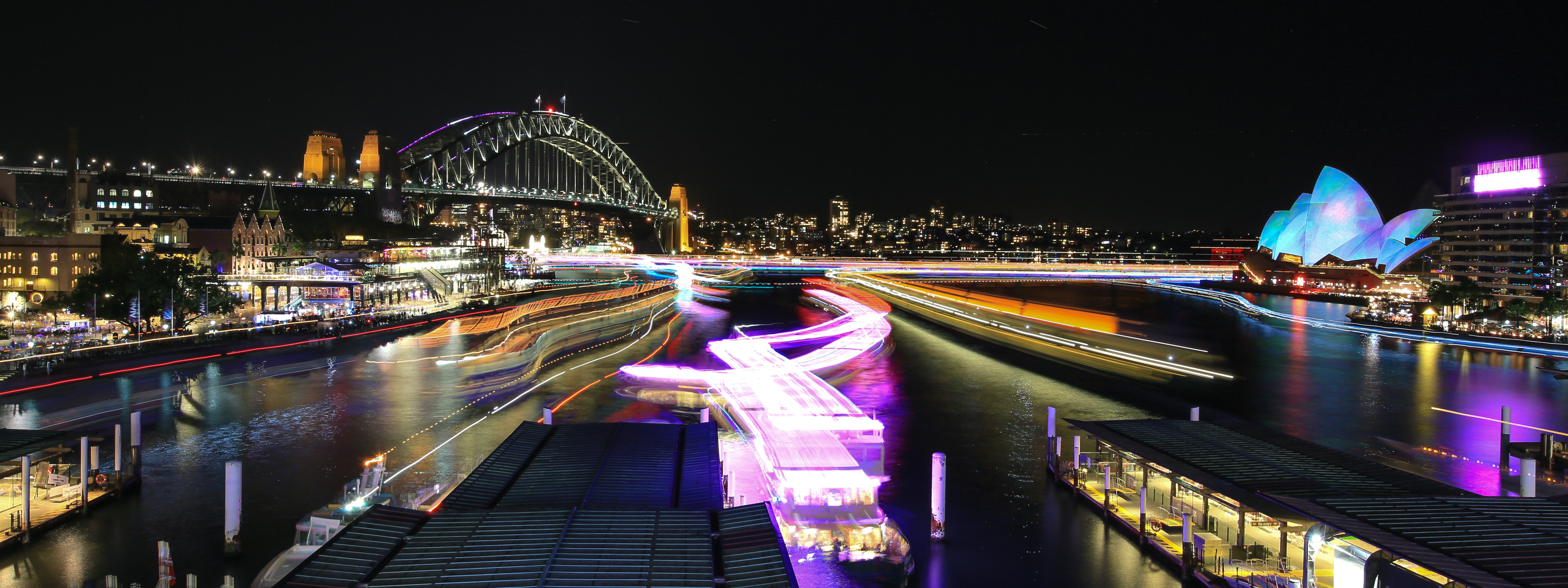
Vivid Sydney, an annual light and music festival attracts more than 3 millions visitors each year. It is the largest festival of its kind in the southern hemisphere.

Tourism in Sydney forms an important part of the city's economy. The city received 12 million domestic visitors and 4.1 million international visitors in year ending June 2019. The most famous attractions include the Sydney Opera House, and the Sydney Harbour Bridge. Other attractions include the Sydney Mardi Gras, Royal Botanical Gardens, Luna Park, the beaches and Sydney Tower.

== Tourism promotion ==
The Government of New South Wales operates two relevant programs relevant to Sydney as part of the NSW Tourism Strategy:

- Brand Sydney – Revitalise and strengthen the image and appeal of Sydney.
- Visit Sydney – To increase promotion of Sydney as a tourist destination through a strengthened dedicated business unit within Destination NSW.

=== Brand Sydney ===
Brand Sydney project will be led by the Premier of New South Wales, overseen by the Minister for Tourism and a Project Steering Committee and delivered by the Project Team. John O'Neill is the chair of Brand Sydney.

== Sydney Harbour ==
Port Jackson is the natural harbour of Sydney. It is known for its natural environment, and as the location of the Sydney Opera House and Sydney Harbour Bridge. The area around the harbour foreshore contains pockets of bushland which was once common around Sydney, containing a range of native animals.

=== Sydney Opera House ===
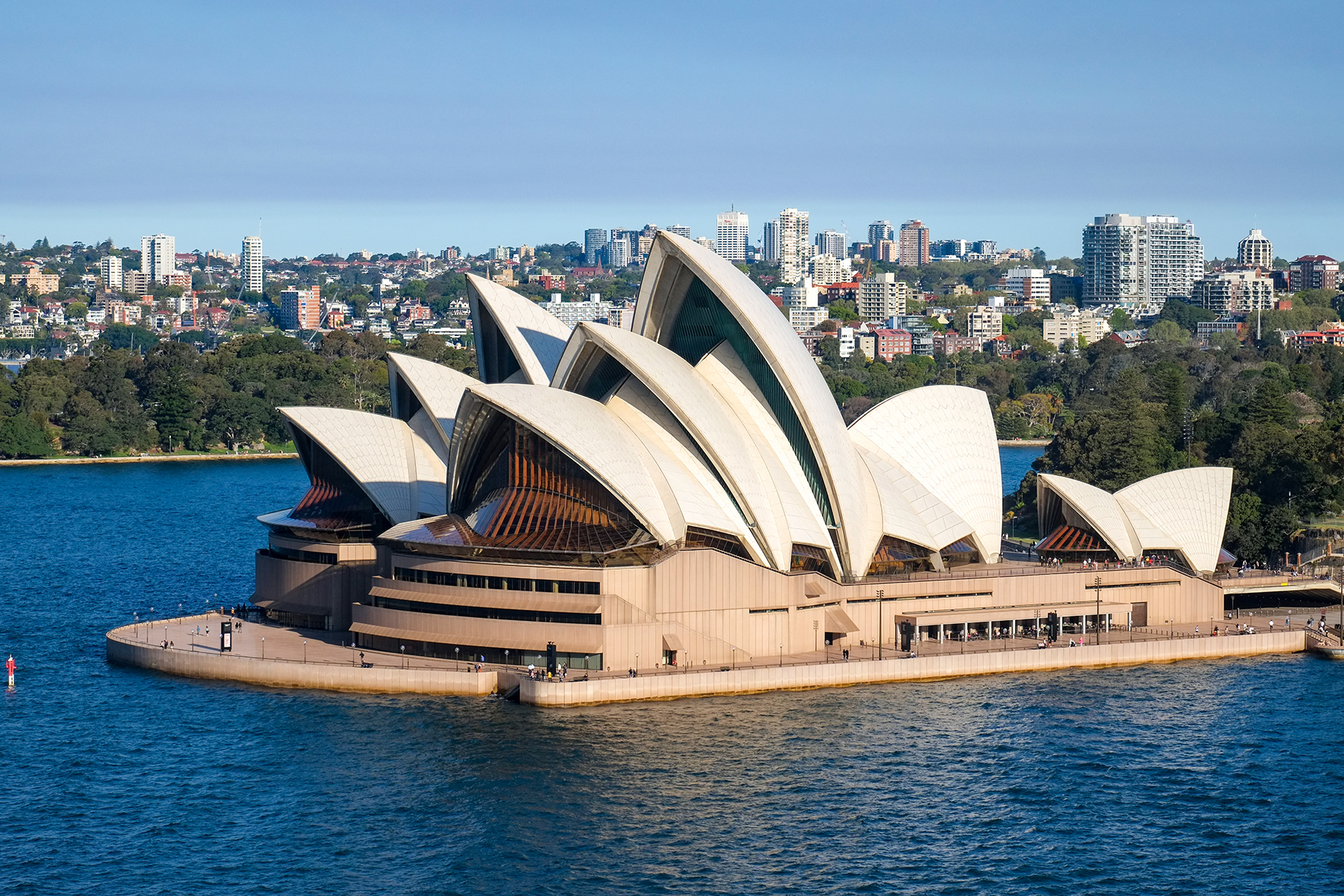
The Sydney Opera House is one of the most recognisable buildings in the world. The landmark attracts more than 10 million visitors each year.

The Sydney Opera House is one of the most distinctive and famous 20th-century buildings, and one of the most famous performing arts venues in the world. Situated on Bennelong Point in Sydney Harbour, with parkland to its south and close to the equally famous Sydney Harbour Bridge, the building and its surroundings form an iconic Australian image.

The building was included in the Olympic Torch route in 2000 to the Sydney Olympic Stadium. It was the backdrop of some events for the 2000 Summer Olympics, including the triathlon—which began at the Opera House—and the yachting events on Sydney Harbour. The dramatic exteriors have not been matched with technically superior interiors, and the Opera House's reputation as a music venue has suffered as a result.

=== Sydney Harbour Bridge ===
The Sydney Harbour Bridge is the main crossing of Sydney Harbour carrying rail, vehicular, and pedestrian traffic between the Sydney central business district (CBD) and the North Shore. The dramatic water vista of the bridge together with the nearby Sydney Opera House is an iconic image of both Sydney and Australia. The South-east pylon for many years operated as lookout and tourist attraction, containing a number of telescopes and antiquated arcade games which operated on pennies, long after that currency had gone out of operation. The pylon has recently been renovated and returned to its tourist function.

=== Bridge Climb ===
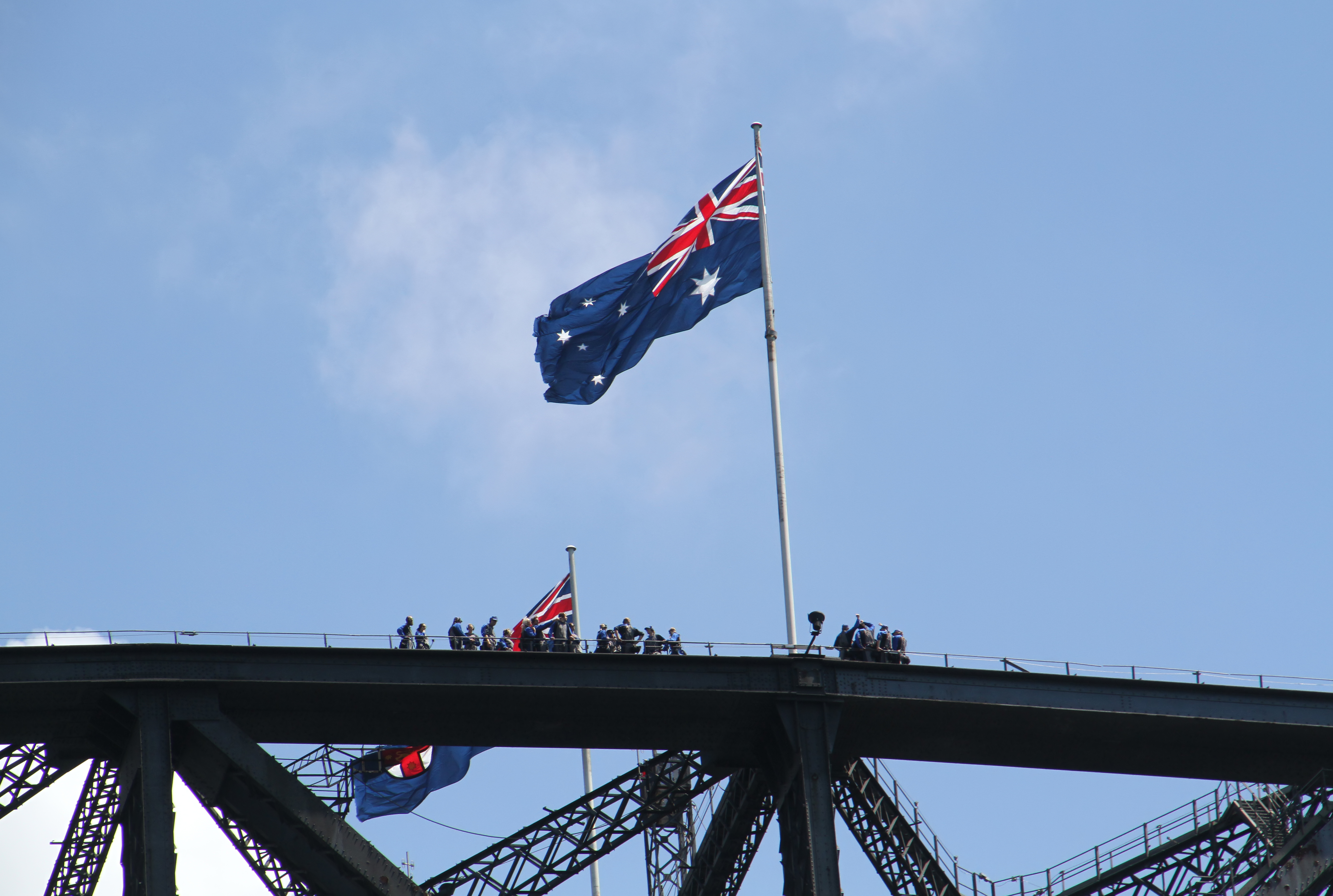
Visitors taking part in the bridge climb can be seen atop the Sydney Harbour Bridge.

Since 1998, BridgeClimb has made it possible for tourists to climb the southern half of the bridge. Tours run throughout the day, from dawn to dusk and are only cancelled for electrical storms or high wind. Night climbs are also available. Groups of climbers are provided with protective clothing appropriate to the prevailing weather conditions and are given an orientation before climbing. During the climb, attendees are secured to the bridge by a wire lifeline. Each climb begins on the eastern side of the bridge and ascends to the top. At the summit, the group crosses to the western side of the arch for the descent. Each climb is a three-and-a-half-hour experience.

=== Historic forts ===
The shores of Sydney Harbour are home to a number of historic batteries, bunkers and forts, many of which are now heritage listed. Some of these forts date back to 1871 and were part of Sydney Harbours defence system that was designed to withstand a seaborn attack. There are four historical fortifications located between Bradleys Head and Middle Head on the north side of the harbour; the Middle Head Fortifications, the Georges Head Battery, the Lower Georges Heights Commanding Position and a small fort located on Bradleys Head. The forts were constructed from mostly large sandstone blocks and consist of many tunnels, catacombs and underground rooms.

=== Watsons Bay ===
Watsons Bay sits on the end of the South Head peninsula and takes its name from the sheltered bay and anchorage on its western side, in Port Jackson. It provides some of the best views across the harbour to the city of Sydney and the Harbour Bridge.|The Gap is an ocean cliff on the eastern side with views to Manly, North Head and the Pacific Ocean.

Watsons Bay is a mostly residential area with some recreational areas and beaches, including one legal nude beach. Some restaurants, cafes and the Watsons Bay Hotel are located here, with Doyles on the Beach, one of the Sydney's most famous seafood restaurants, located on the foreshore of Watsons Bay. The naval base HMAS Watson is located nearby at South Head.

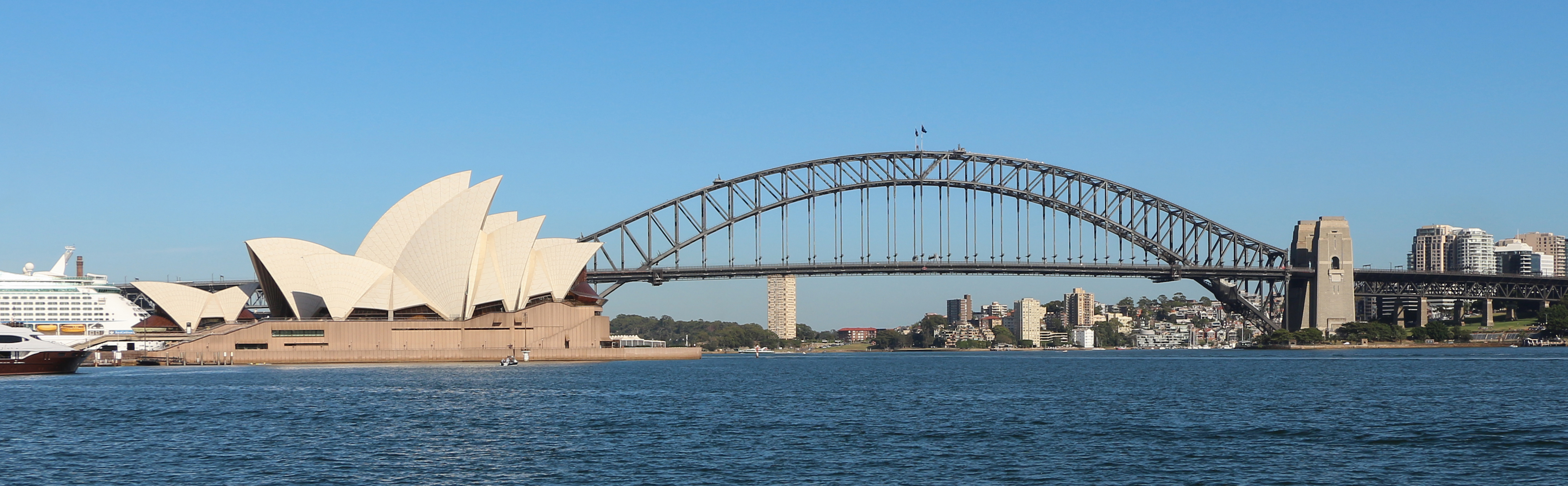
The view of the Sydney Opera House and Sydney Harbour Bridge along the harbour is widely regarded as an iconic image of Sydney.

== City of Sydney ==
=== The Rocks ===
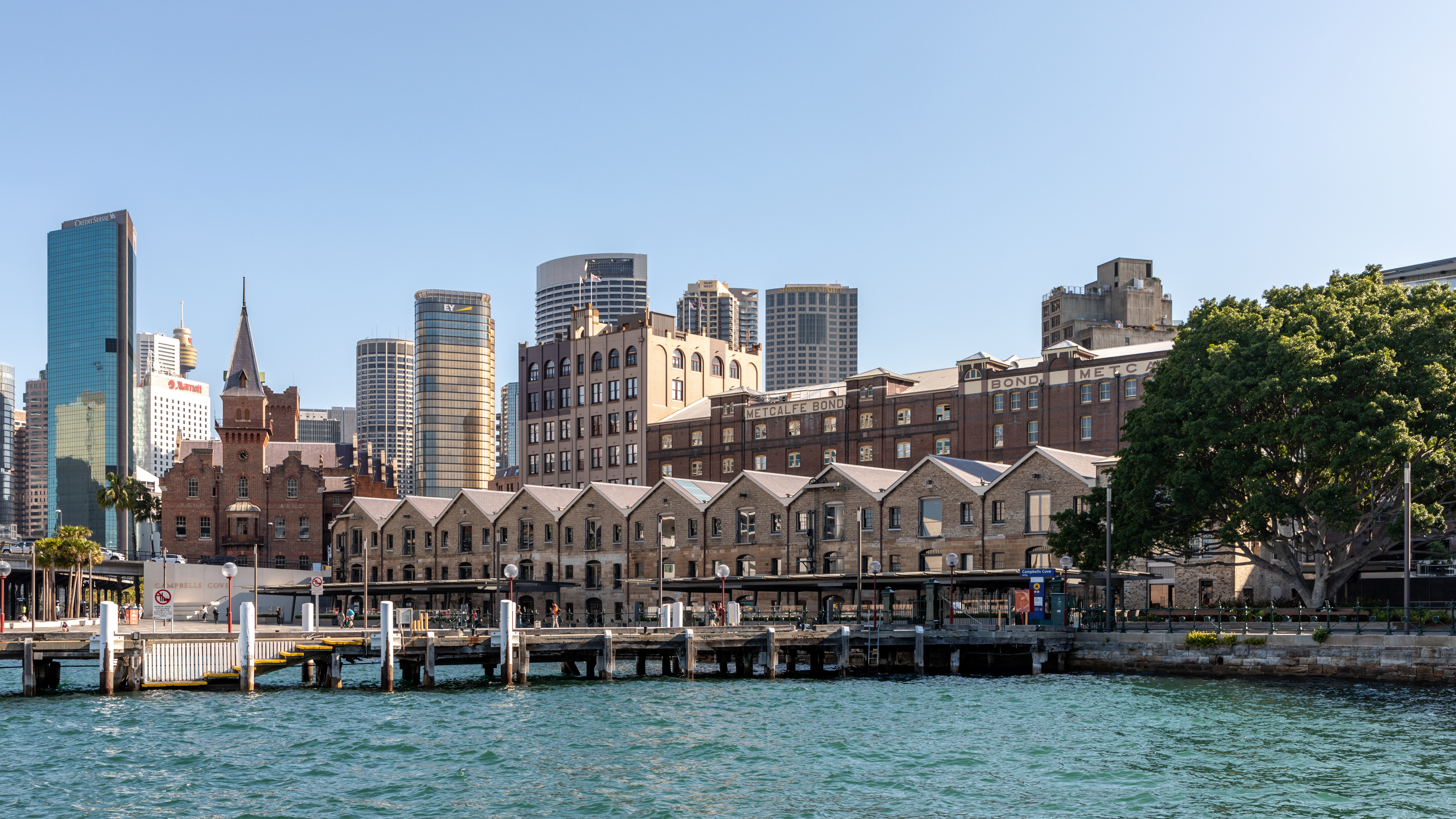
The Rocks on the shores of Sydney Harbour

The Rocks is an inner-city suburb, tourist precinct and historic area of Sydney. It is located on the southern shore of Sydney Harbour adjacent to the city centre, close to where Sydney was first settled in 1788. The close proximity to Circular Quay and the views of the iconic Harbour Bridge, as well as the historic nature of many of the buildings, mean that the Rocks is very popular with tourists. It features a variety of souvenir and craft shops, and many themed and historic pubs. The Rocks Market operates each weekend, with around 100 stalls. There are numerous historic walks through the area, visiting historical buildings such as Cadman's Cottage, Sydney Observatory, and the Dawes Point Battery, which was the first fortified position in New South Wales.

=== Sydney Tower ===
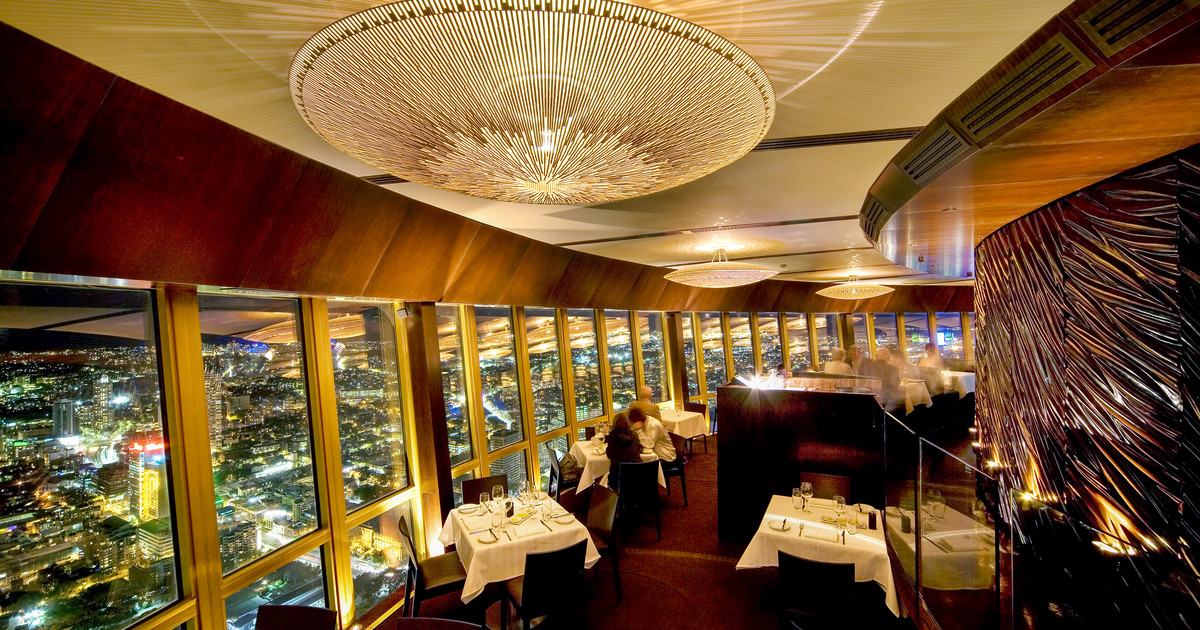
360 Bar and Dining, which offers revolving views of the Sydney skyline, is located on level one of the Sydney Tower.

Sydney Tower is Sydney's tallest free-standing structure, and the third tallest in Australia, the Q1 building on the Gold Coast being the tallest. It is also the second tallest observation tower in the Southern Hemisphere after Auckland, New Zealand's Sky Tower (Auckland); though Sydney Tower's main observation deck is almost 50 metres higher than that of the Sky Tower. The Sydney Tower is a member of the World Federation of Great Towers. It is known by locals as the Centrepoint Tower, after the shopping centre building the tower sprouts from.

Sydney Tower Skywalk, or just Skywalk, is an open-air, glass-floored platform circling Sydney Tower at a height of 260m above ground level. The moving viewing platform extends out over the edge of the main structure of Sydney Tower. This attraction is more than twice as high as the popular BridgeClimb walk to the top of Sydney Harbour Bridge. From the platform the seaward horizon is 58 kilometres away, although inland features such as the Blue Mountains can be seen at further distances. See Sydney Attractions Group.

=== Darling Harbour ===
Darling Harbour was redeveloped from an industrial wharf to a major tourist and retail precinct in 1988, and is home to a number of major public facilities and attractions, including:

- Sydney's Chinese Gardens
- Tumbalong Park
- International Convention Centre
- Australian National Maritime Museum (featuring museum ships including HMAS Vampire)
- The Star Casino
- Sydney Aquarium
- the IMAX Sydney theatre (part of The Ribbon building)
- Wildlife World

The Darling Harbour precinct is linked to the CBD by the Pyrmont Bridge

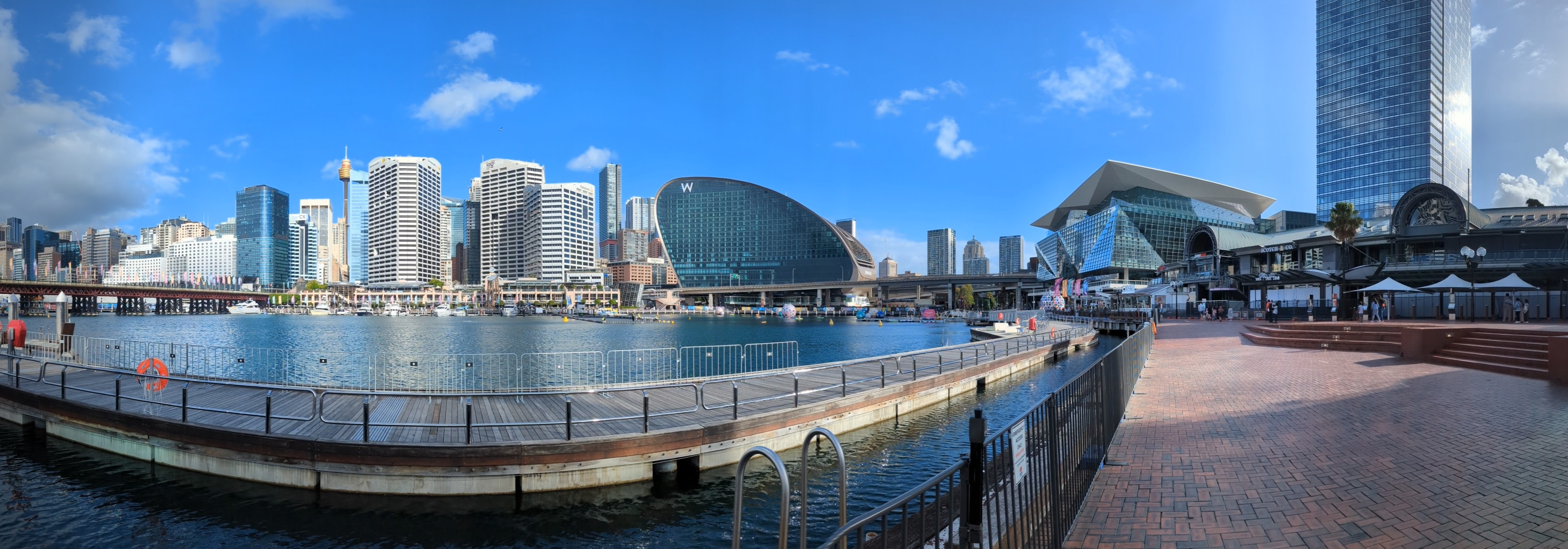
Darling Harbour is a well-known entertainment and tourism destination in Sydney.

=== Kings Cross ===
The Kings Cross area is infamous in Australia as being a red light district, similar to Kings Cross, London with numerous strip clubs and "girlie" bars along Darlinghurst Road, although the demographics have changed in recent years and gentrification of the area has led to clashes between new and established elements. Kings Cross is also known for its Neon signs and advertising posters, the most famous being the iconic Coca-Cola billboard. It is often affectionately referred to by Sydneysiders by the colloquialism "the Cross".

The Kings Cross district was the City of Sydney's bohemian heartland from the early decades of the 20th century, but due its proximity to the naval docking area at Garden Island it also came to serve as the city's main tourist accommodation and entertainment centre, as well as its red-light district. The drugs and crime associated with this trade led to Kings Cross achieving a high level of notoriety.

=== Macquarie Street ===
Running from the Sydney Opera House and linking the Royal Botanic Gardens, the Domain and Hyde park, Macquarie Street is home to some of Sydney's most historic buildings and cultural institutions. At its southern end are Hyde Park Barracks Museum commissioned by Governor Macquarie in the early 1800s. Across from the barracks is St James' Church, Sydney city's oldest church. Next to these is the "Rum Hospital". Completed in 1816 the northern part was expanded to become the Parliament House for New South Wales. The southern wing of the building now houses the Sydney Mint Museum. Next to these is Sydney's oldest Library, the State Library of New South Wales. Progressing north are the historic Chief Secretary's Building and the old New South Wales Treasury. Within the Royal Botanic Gardens are Government House and the Sydney Conservatorium of Music, originally built as the Government House stables. At the northern terminus of Macquarie Street is the iconic Sydney Opera House.

=== Museums ===
Sydney is home to a number of established museums. The Australian Museum is the oldest museum in Australia, and is particularly renowned in the fields of natural history and anthropology. The Museum of Sydney is located in Australia's first Government House, and its permanent and temporary exhibitions highlight the history of the city. The Powerhouse Museum specialises in science and technology, and its exhibits include the oldest steam engine in the world with a rotating action that is still in operation. The Australian National Maritime Museum focuses on Australia's maritime history. The Museum of Contemporary Art, located at Circular Quay, recently underwent a $58 million expansion.

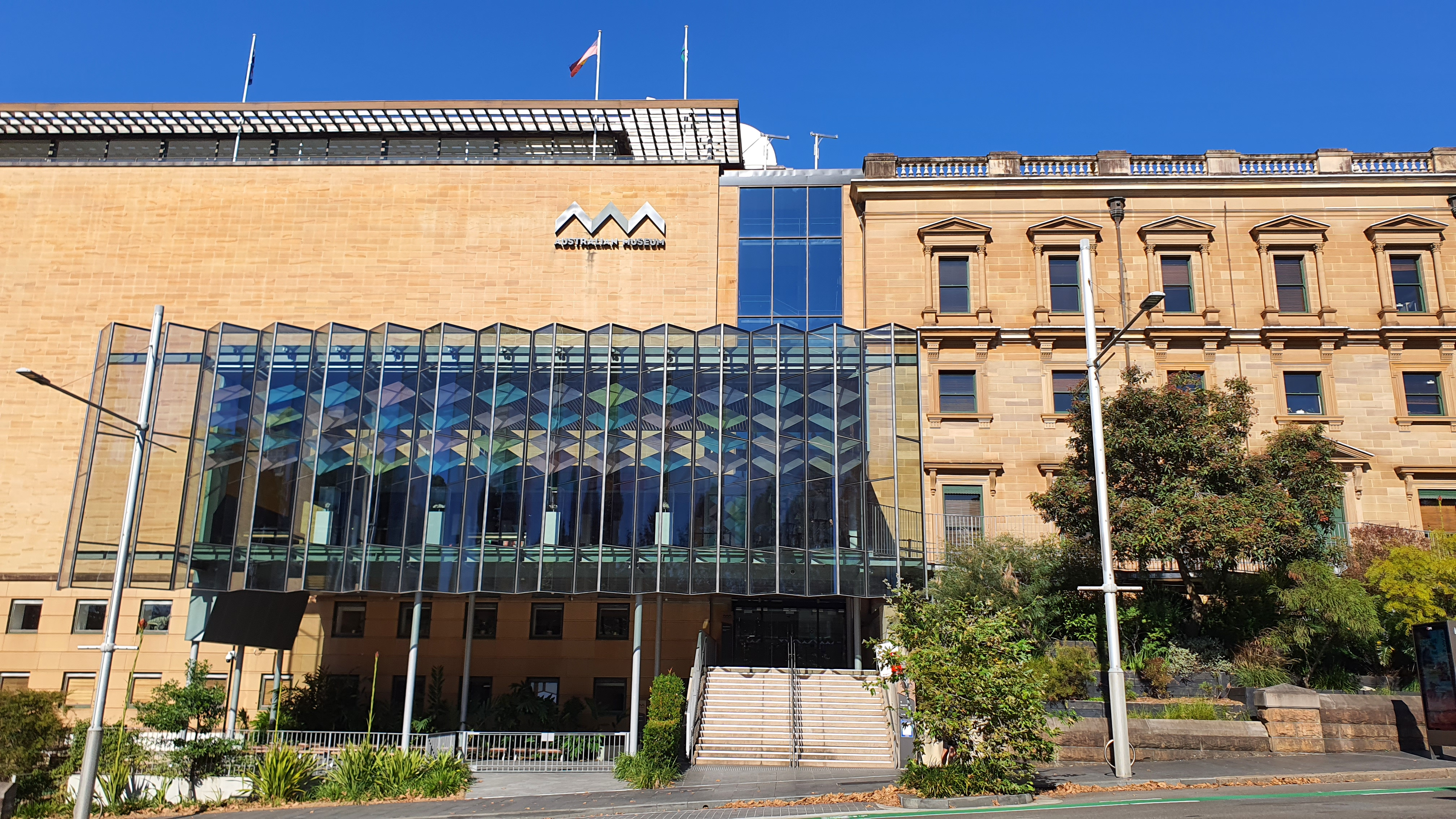
Australian Museum

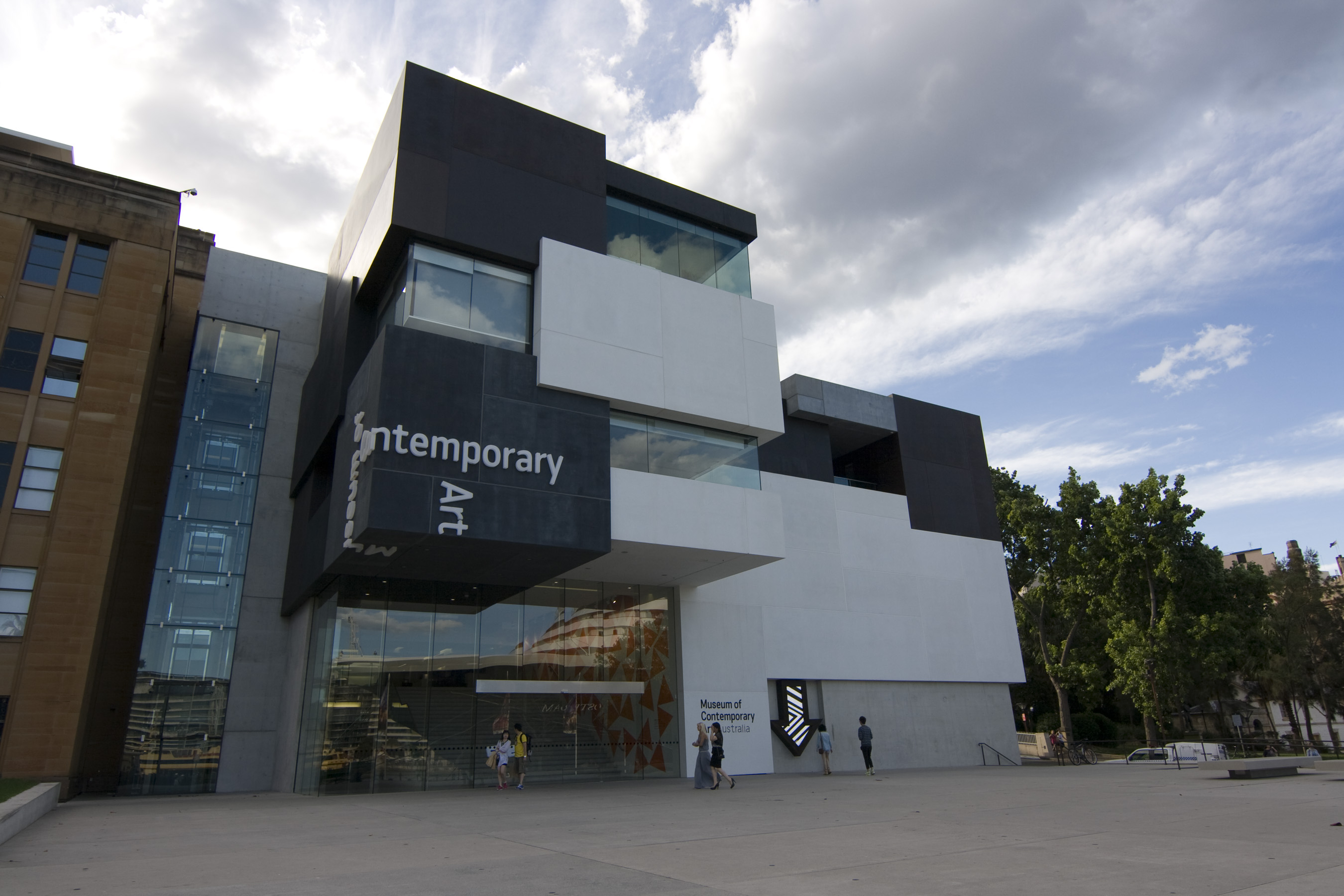
Museum of Contemporary Art Australia

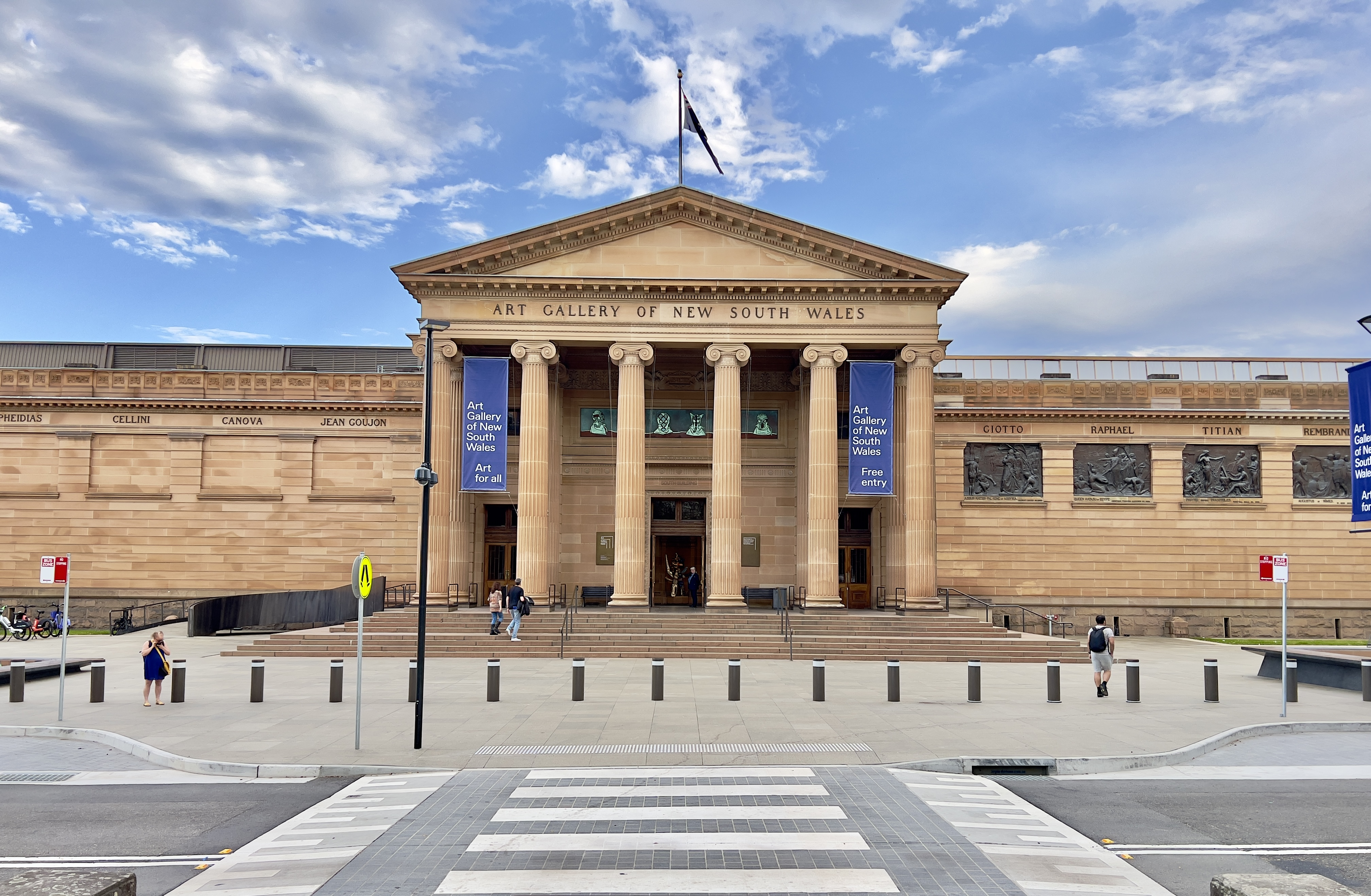
Art Gallery of New South Wales

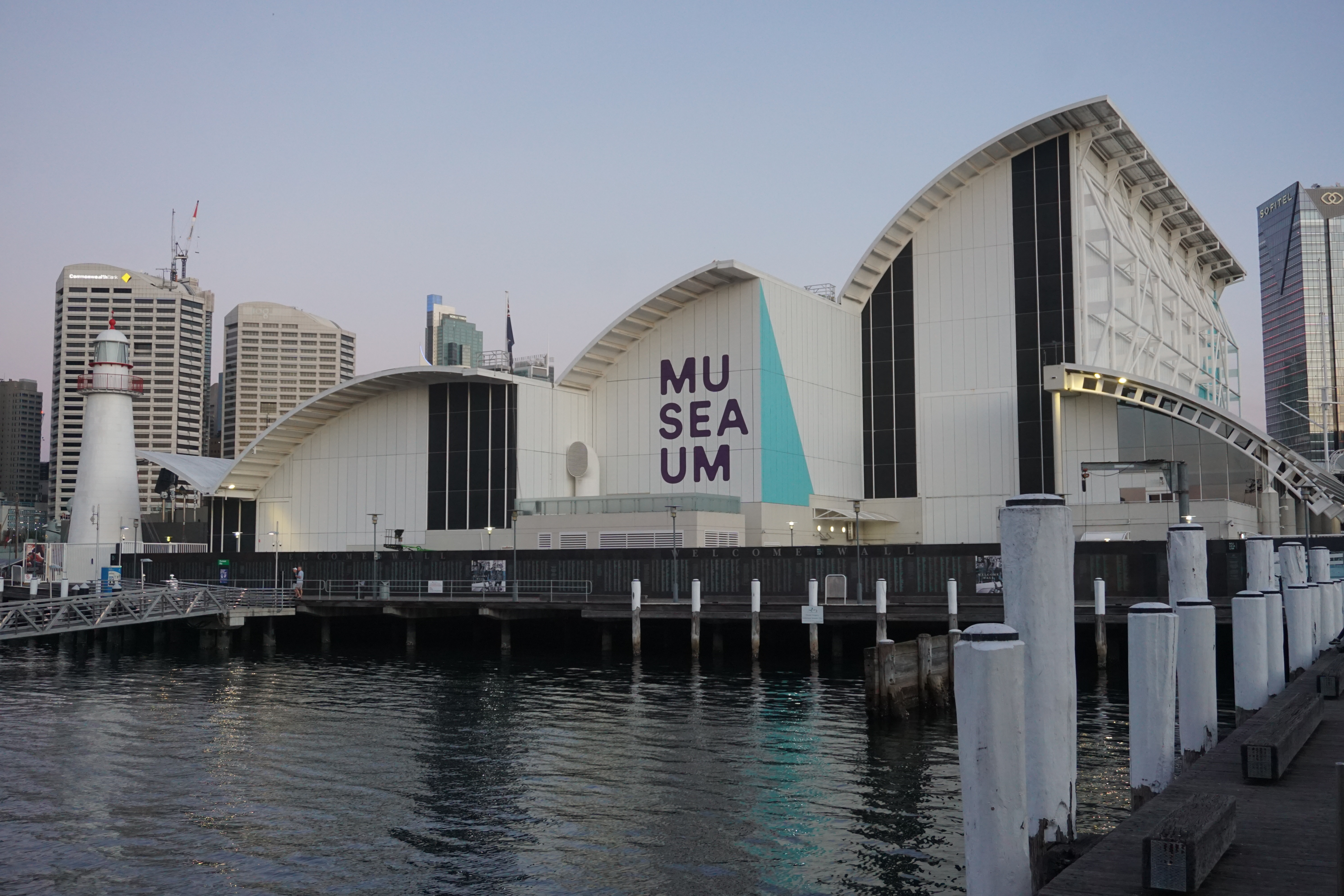
Australian National Maritime Museum

=== City Parks ===
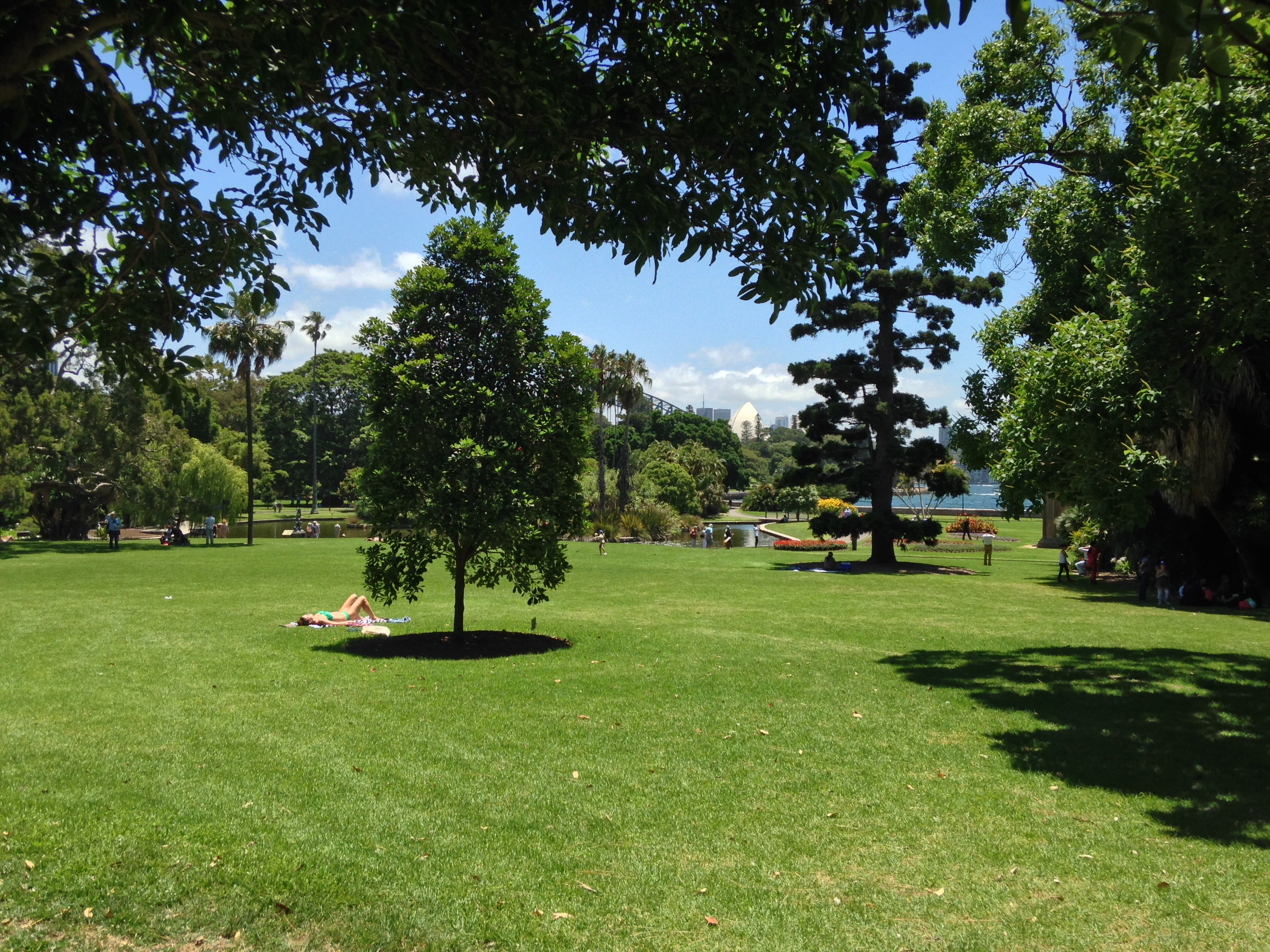
The Royal Botanic Garden in Sydney is the second-oldest botanic garden in the southern hemisphere.

Hyde Park contains well-kept gardens and approximately 580 trees; a mixture of Moreton Bay figs, palms and other varieties. It is famed for its magnificent fig tree lined avenues, a peaceful haven in the business heart of the city. At the park's southern end is the Anzac Memorial and a monument consisting of a 104-millimetre gun from the German light cruiser SMS Emden. It is a dynamic park, offering both a retreat from the city and a lively cultural centre, featuring public events, live music, and other performance art.

Royal Botanic Garden Sydney are the largest of three major botanical gardens open to the public in Sydney. Admission is free and it is open to the public every day of the year.

== Wildlife ==
=== Taronga Zoo ===
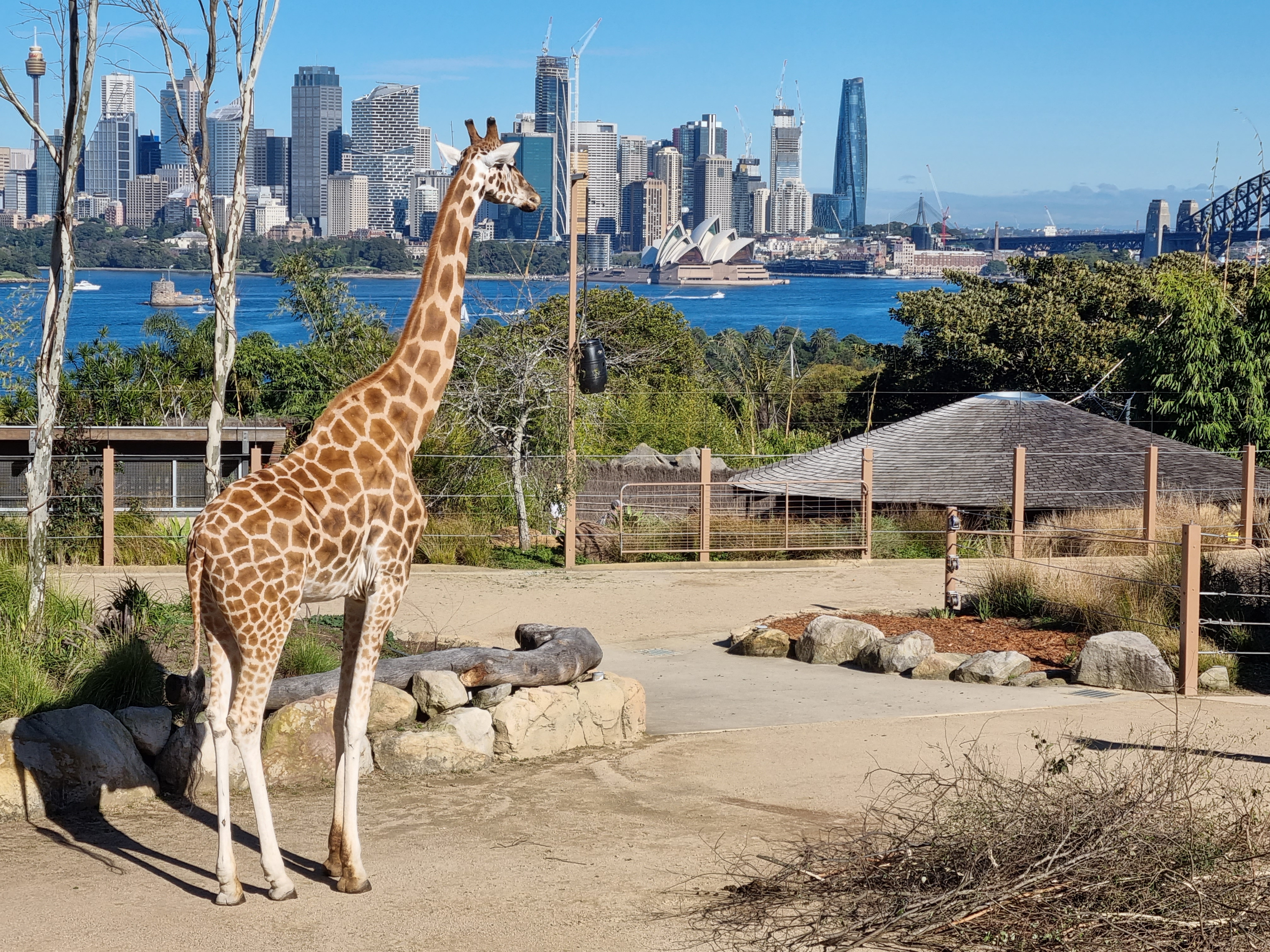
Taronga Zoo, one of the largest metropolitan zoos in the world

Taronga Zoo is the city zoo of Sydney, officially opened on 7 October 1916. It is located on the shores of Sydney Harbour in Mosman. Taronga is linked to Dubbo's Western Plains Zoo in terms of breeding programs. Taronga Zoo is home to over 2,600 animals on 28.7 hectares, making it one of the largest of its kind, and it divided into eight zoogeographic regions with numerous indoor pavilions and outdoor exhibits. Taronga Zoo has about 340 different species of animal, and are housed in a large variety of exhibits.

=== Sydney Wildlife World ===
Sydney Wildlife World is a zoo in the Sydney central business district. It officially opened in September 2006. It is located on the shores of Darling Harbour and is attached to Sydney Aquarium. Sydney Wildlife World is unusual for a zoo in that it is entirely enclosed and air-conditioned. The indoor zoo features a one-kilometre walkway which snakes through 7000 square metres of enclosures. The enclosure features around 6000 native animals.

=== Whale Watching ===
Sydney's coastline is part of the annual group 5 Humpback migration path from Antarctica to the Coral sea. From mid May to Early December they can be seen in the waters of the coast and on rare occasions swimming into Sydney Harbour itself. Whale Watching can be done from any of the clifftop walks or lookouts, however there are volunteer locations at North Head and Cape Solander at Botany Bay and a number of boat based whale watching tours departing from the Sydney CBD.

== Sydney suburbs and day trips ==
=== Beaches ===
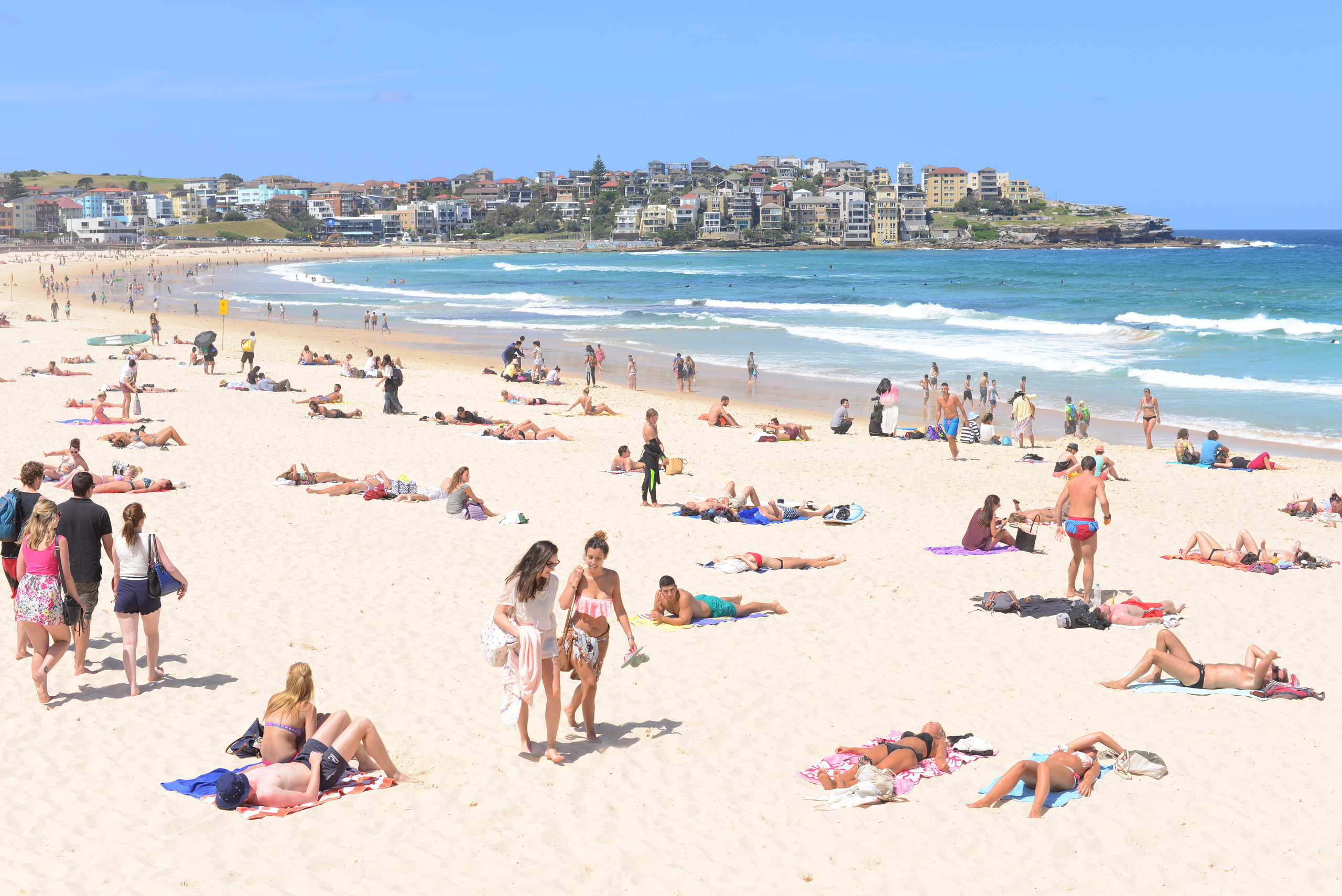
Bondi Beach, one of the most well-known beaches in Sydney

==== Bondi Beach ====
Sydney's most famous beach attracts large numbers of tourists to Bondi Beach throughout the year with many Irish and British tourists spending Christmas Day there. Bondi Beach features many cafes, restaurants and hotels, some with views of the beach and surrounding headlands. The beach itself is approximately one kilometre long.

==== Manly Beach ====
Manly Beach is a well-known beach situated at the southern end of Sydney's Northern Beaches. Manly Beach's is connected to the city by a 20-minute ferry service making it popular with tourists and is host to a number of international surfing events.

=== Blue Mountains ===
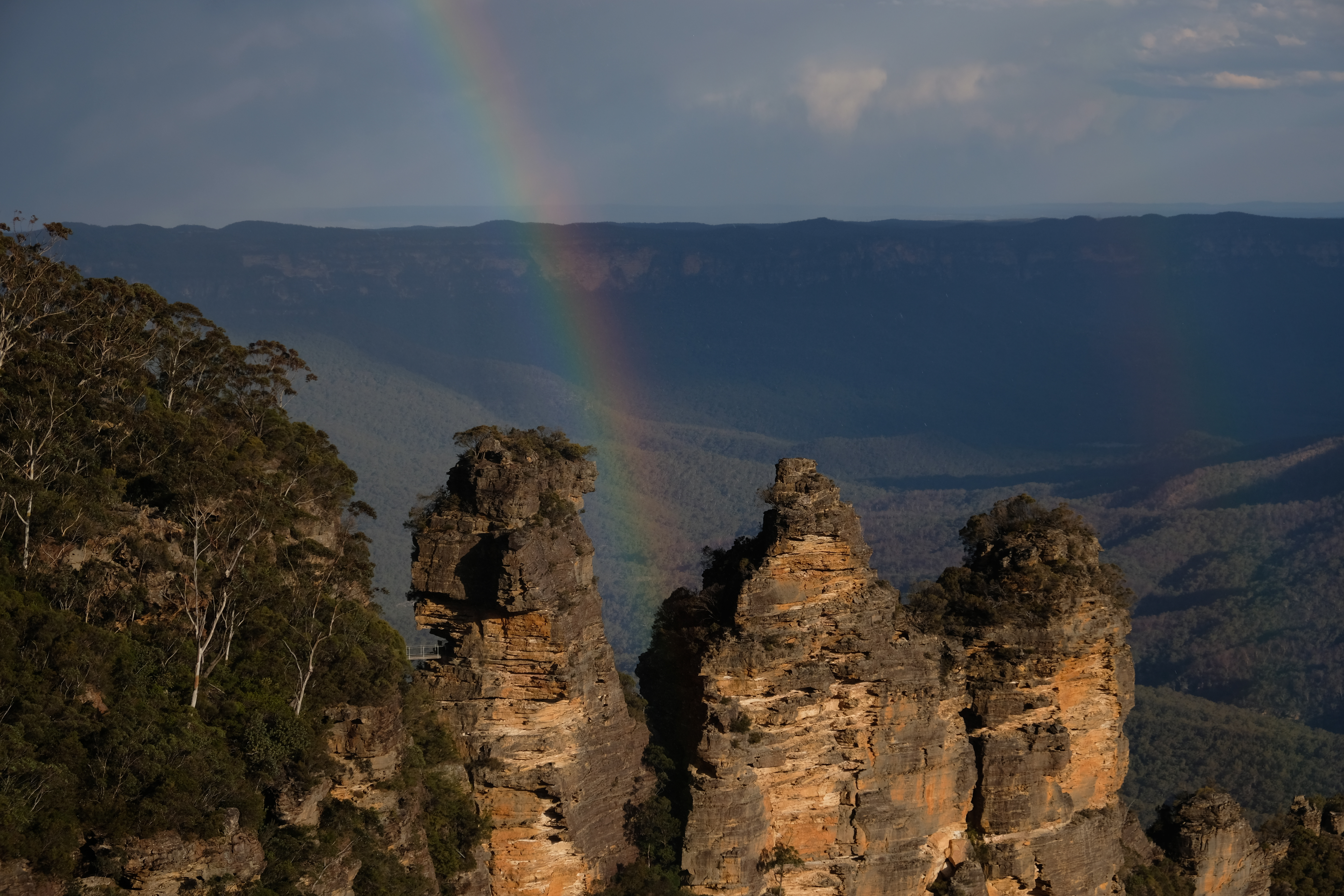
The Three Sisters is a widely recognised rock formation in the Blue Mountains.

The Blue Mountains National Park is one of the most popular parks in Australia. The majority of tourists to the Blue Mountains see the National Park from one of the many lookouts between Wentworth Falls and Blackheath, and many of these never actually set foot in the park.

Despite this, there are many activities for the visitor. Short walks to impressive lookouts above cliffs, such as of three Three Sisters, and waterfalls abound. Overnight and longer walks allow access to some of the more remote areas of the park. Other popular activities include canyoning and mountain biking. The national park is also home to the world's steepest railway, the Katoomba Scenic Railway.

=== Sydney Olympic Park ===
Sydney Olympic Park is a 640-hectare site located adjacent to the suburb of Homebush Bay. It was built for the 2000 Summer Olympics and continues to be used for sporting and cultural events, including the Sydney Royal Easter Show, Sydney Festival, Big Day Out and a number of world class sporting fixtures. It is served by the Olympic Park railway station. There are also regular services to the nearby wharf which operate from various points around Sydney Harbour.

== See also ==
- Art Gallery of New South Wales
- Chinatown, Sydney
- Disney Studios Australia
- Queen Victoria Building
- Randwick Racecourse
- Sydney Mint
- Sydney Town Hall
- Tourism in Australia
