= Laya Project =

Laya Project is a 2007 world music documentary produced by EarthSync, a world music audio-visual production company based in South India. The project is a "personal and collective musical tribute to the resilience of the human spirit", and is dedicated to the survivors of the December 26 2004 Asian tsunami.

A team of sound engineers and camera men took a two-year journey through six countries, including India, Indonesia, Sri Lanka, Thailand, Maldives and Myanmar, and recorded film footage and music with the local musicians. The material was mastered at the Clementine studio in Chennai. The film was directed by Harold Monfils. The music was produced by Patrick Sebag.

Laya Project won various awards (Founder's Choice Award at the New York International Independent Film and Video Festival, Best Film Award at the Byron Bay Film Festival, Special Juror's Choice Award at Zanzibar International Film Festival in Tanzania and the Audience Award at Imaginaria Film Festival in Italy) and is being screened at international film festivals in places such as Los Angeles, St. Petersburg, Tel Aviv, Mumbai and Kuala Lumpur. It has also been broadcast worldwide on the National Geographic Channel.

- Executive Producer - Sastry Karra
- Producers - Sonya Mazumdar and Joanne de Rozario
- Film Director - Harold Monfils
- Music Director - Patrick Sebag
- Sound Design, Music & Recording - Yotam Agam
- Editing and Post-Production - Arturo Calvete, Henrik Sikstrom, Jose Garrido
- Line Producer & Research - Ernest Hariyanto
- Still Photography - Timur Angin
- Stage and Light Design - Jackie Shemesh
- Director of Photography - Cheong Yuk Hoy, Agung Dewantoro
- Mixed & Mastered at Clementine Studios, India
