= Big Wata =

Sierra Leone documentary

- Directed by: Jan Paul van der Velden, Gugi van der Velden
- Release dates: 2018
- Running time: +80 minutes
- Countries: Netherlands, Sierra Leone, Liberia
- Language: English

Big Wata is a 2018 Sierra Leone documentary that was directed by Gugi van der Velden and produced by Floris Loeff.

== Plot ==
The youth of a fishing community in Sierra Leone have discovered their new identity through surfing, but the elders in the community disapprove of what they set out to do but they have to fight all odds to make their dreams come true.
