= Vivid Sydney =

Recurring festival in Sydney, New South Wales, Australia

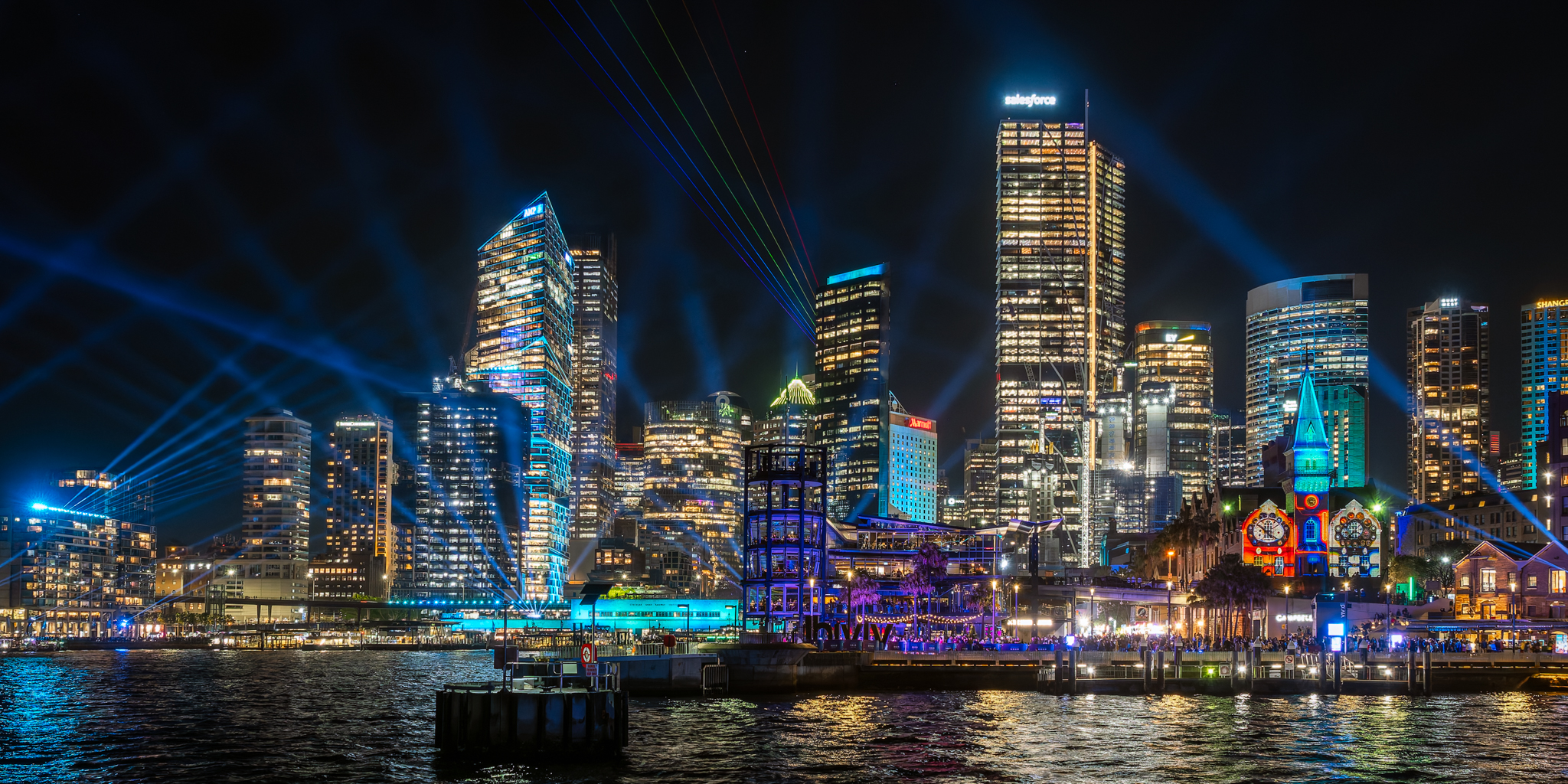
- Circular Quay during Vivid 2024
- Genre: Exhibition
- Frequency: Annual
- Location: Sydney
- Years active: 14
- Inaugurated: 2009
- Most recent: 22 May 2026 – 13 June 2026
- Attendance: 3.28 million (2023)
- Patron: City of Sydney
- Website: www.vividsydney.com

Vivid Sydney is an annual festival held in Sydney, New South Wales, Australia. It includes outdoor immersive light installations and projections, performances by local and international musicians, and an ideas exchange forum featuring public talks and debates with leading creative thinkers.

This event takes place over the course of three weeks in May and June. The centrepieces of Vivid Sydney are the light sculptures, multimedia interactive work and building projections that transform various buildings and landmarks such as the Sydney Opera House and Sydney Harbour Bridge in and around the Sydney central business district into an outdoor night time canvas of art.

Past sites of interest include Central Park, Chatswood, and the University of Sydney as well as around the CBD, Darling Harbour and The Rocks.

== History ==
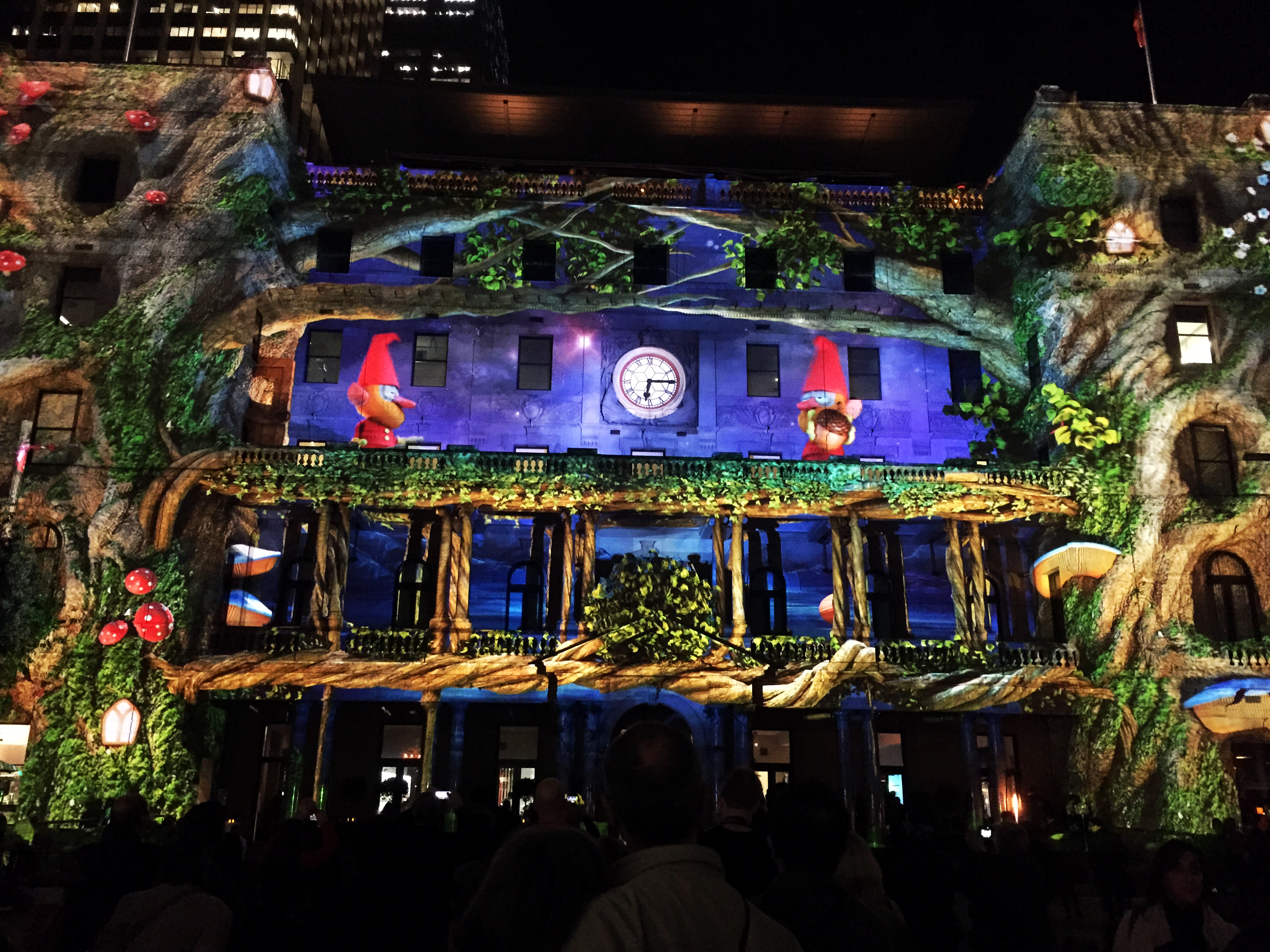
Customs House, Vivid 2015

Vivid Sydney was conceptualised in 2008 and initially developed as low energy light festival. 'Smart Light Sydney' was a concept developed by MaryAnne Kyriakou (who was inspired by the Glow Light Festival which was held in Eindhoven, the Netherlands, since 2006 and where she participated), Anthony Bastic, Carolyn Grant, Joe Snell and Davina Jackson.

Anthony Bastic presented the concept of a low energy light walk around Sydney's Circular Quay, linking the CBD, to the NSW Government. After securing British multi-genre popular culture artist, Brian Eno as the lead light artist, the NSW Government sought the expansion of the content to include the music and ideas component.

The original name "Smart Light Sydney" was replaced with Vivid Sydney to better represent the streams of Light, Music and Ideas.

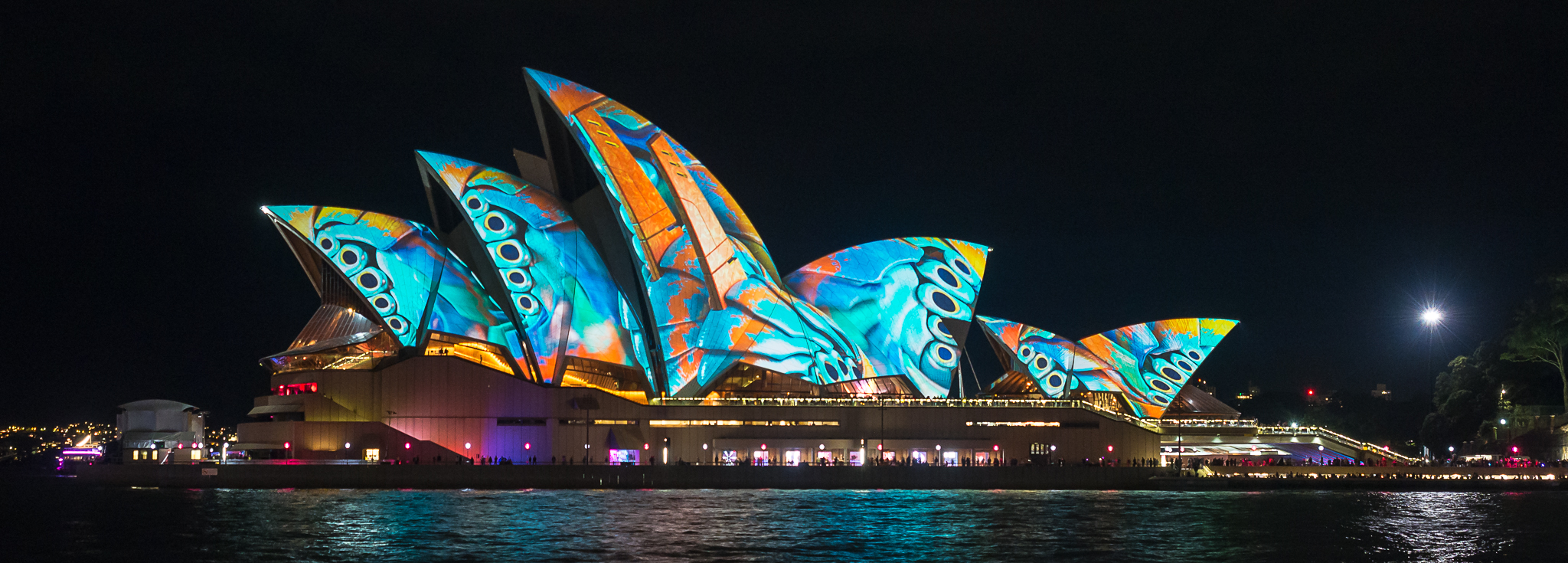
The Sydney Opera House illuminated during Vivid 2017

From 2009–2018 Anthony Bastic's company, AGB Events, was responsible for curating and producing the public facing light component for NSW Government. As of May 2019, it was the biggest festival of lights, music and ideas in the world. It is owned, managed and produced by Destination NSW, the State Government's tourism and events agency. In 2019 a record 2.4 million people attended.

The 2020 event was cancelled due to the COVID-19 pandemic. In 2021 Vivid was first scheduled for 6–28 August, it was then postponed to September due to the Delta outbreak and lockdown in Sydney. It was finally cancelled on 6 August.

== Commercial success ==
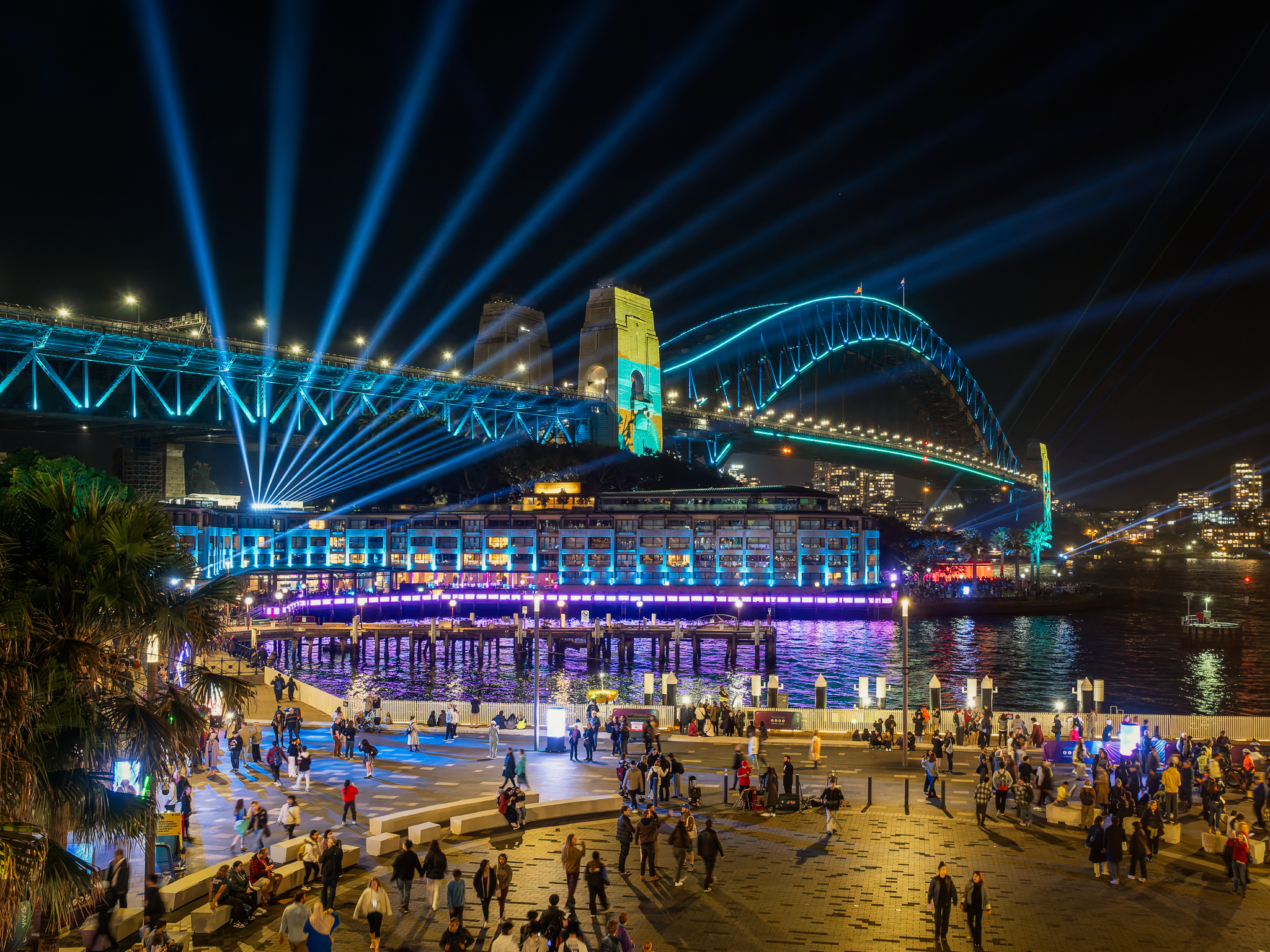
Crowds gather around Campbells Cove during Vivid 2024

According to then New South Wales Deputy Premier and government Andrew Stoner, Vivid Sydney 2012 attracted more than 500,000 visitors to the outdoor exhibition and events, generating around $10 million in income for the state, whereas Vivid Sydney 2013 attracted more than 800,000 visitors, contributing more than $20 million to the NSW economy.

In 2014, the festival involved the Sydney Opera House, Walsh Bay, Circular Quay, The Rocks, North Sydney, Darling Harbour, and, joining for the first time, Harbour Lights (the illumination of vessels upon the Harbour), The Star and Carriageworks. A new projection work by London based creative team 59 Productions featured for the Lighting of the Sails of the Sydney Opera House.

In 2015, Vivid Sydney attracted more than 1.7 million visitors to the city. The 2016 Vivid event included an expanded program of multi-genre music, stimulating presentations and Vivid Talks from global presenters and dazzling light projections across the city. In 2016, a display was added at Taronga Zoo.

In 2016, Vivid Sydney was extended to 23 nights and was attended by more than 2.3 million people.

In 2017, Vivid Sydney attracted a record 2.33 million attendees and injected over $143 million into NSW's visitor economy.

In 2019, the Surry Hill precinct was included with a montage of Heckler's 50 most iconic women being displayed on the famous art deco Hollywood Hotel. Publican and proprietress Doris Goddard was inducted as the 51st icon.

== Artistic program ==
Vivid Sydney produces programming across numerous streams. These include Vivid Light, Vivid Music, Vivid Ideas, Vivid School, The Lighting of the Sails of Sydney Opera House and Vivid Live.

=== Vivid Light ===
Along what is known as the Vivid Light Walk, through The Rocks, Circular Quay and Royal Botanic Garden, there are many opportunities for individuals to interact with light installations through such means as unique technologies. This program includes large-scale projection on other historical buildings such as the Museum of Contemporary Art Australia, Sydney's Customs House, and the historical Cadmans Cottage. The Sydney Harbour Bridge is also illuminated.

=== Vivid Music ===
Vivid Music includes a range of contemporary music events take place throughout the Sydney CBD. In recent years Carriageworks has played host to a Vivid Music Events.

=== 2024 ===
- Club Broadway + The Carpenters From Kempsey
- K-Indie Music Fest featuring Silica Gel (KOR) + sunwoojunga (KOR)
- 3% – Kill the Dead album launch
- Sounds of Afrobeats
- grentperez + FRIDAY*
- Jalbu Muna featuring Christine Anu, Kee’ahn, Deline Briscoe, Nadeena Dixon and Akala Newman
- Bare Necessities
- Forest Claudette + The Blssm
- Mallrat + Tiffi
- Budjerah + Jem Cassar-Daley
- Wildfire Manwuurk + Battlesnake
- Teenage Joans + Lola Scott
- The Push

=== 2025 ===
- Winston Surfshirt + Jerome Blazé
- Zaeden (IND) + Aswarya
- Dobet Gnahoré (CIV) + Immy Owusu
- Mononeon (USA) + Manfredo Lament
- Gabriele Poso (ITA) + GabzaK
- Stella Jang (KOR) + Ivoris
- Pania + DEVAURA
- Body Type + Ripple Effect Band
- Adrian Eagle + Jada Weazel
- Charley + Ayesha Madon
- NextGen: V-Pop – Mỹ Anh (VIE) + Chi Xê (VIE)
- PASIFIX
- Vivid Sings!

=== 2026 ===
- Matt Corby + Gretta Ray
- Eddy Current Suppression Ring + Chikchika (ETH)
- Hugen (JPN) + NIKO NIKO TAN TAN (JPN)
- Shaun (KOR) + Jiselle (KOR)
- Seun Kuti & Egypt 80 (NGR) + Tjaka
- Mallrat + Lyric
- The Congos (JAM) + Keanu Nelson
- Boy Soda + That Gurl Bella
- Gut Health + Swapmeet
- Billionhappy (CHN) + Sebii (CHN) + Kimj (KOR) + Chalky Wong & Clair (CHN)
- Coterie + Velvet Bloom (Duo)
- Skeleten + Ashkan Shafiei (IRN)
- Moonlight Opera ft. Diego Torre
- Souled Out
- Vivid Fiesta

=== Vivid Ideas ===
Vivid Ideas began in 2012 with founding director Jess Scully, and consists of a range of talks and workshops centred around the business and creative industries. The Vivid Ideas Exchange takes place throughout the festival at the Museum of Contemporary Art Australia.

=== Vivid Food ===
Introduced in 2023, Vivid Food is a new pillar incorporating local and international chefs across several venues in Sydney.

== Past light installations ==
Musical Cubes, a light installation, was an interactive activity in the harbour. In this activity, a group of six individuals would take part in a musical experiment. Each member would be given a three dimensional cube. Each cube represented a different instrument (guitar, piano, etc.) and each side of the cube would represent a different pace (measured in beats per minute). Every member of the group would take their cube, select a side, and place the cube on a table. A computer program would then interpret all the information from the cubes and play the resulting musical beat over loud speakers that surrounded the table. Participants would be allowed to change the tempo of their instrument and as they changed them, the program would react to reflect the change and play the new tune.

In 2015, Heart of the City, was another light installation located in the harbour. This was one of the more popular activities at Vivid due to its immersive nature. Heart of the City resembled a large, solid beanbag chair and was located near the Sydney Opera House. Upon reaching the front of the line, participants would be asked to seat themselves in the middle of the chair. Once seated, they would be instructed by a Vivid Sydney volunteer to insert their finger into a small hole located near the chair. If your finger was inserted correctly, the chair would begin to light up red to match your heartbeat. As participants began to notice this, their heart rate sometimes increased causing the chair to light up more rapidly.

In June 2022, a huge painting called Yarrkalpa — Hunting Ground, painted by Martumili artists in Western Australia, was projected onto the Sydney Opera House as part of the festival, accompanied by the music of electronic music duo Electric Fields and animated by creative technologists Curiious. The design symbolically depicts the area around Parnngurr, showing the seasons, cultural burning practices and Indigenous management of the land and natural resources.

What Lies Beneath is a data visualisation project displayed at Vivid Sydney 2023 by Susan Kosti. Set against the backdrop of the data-driven digital age, the project utilises a distinct visual language derived from data spanning from 2003 to 2023, provided by NASA. Using 3D mapping techniques, the stones of Nawi Cove were transformed into a representation of an underwater habitat, complete with corals and marine entities. Each animated entity within the display altered its form based on specific data sets that corresponded to patterns observed in oceanic behaviour. This installation aimed to bridge the gap between data interpretation and visual art, providing viewers with an insight into the multifaceted nature of ocean dynamics.

== Gallery ==
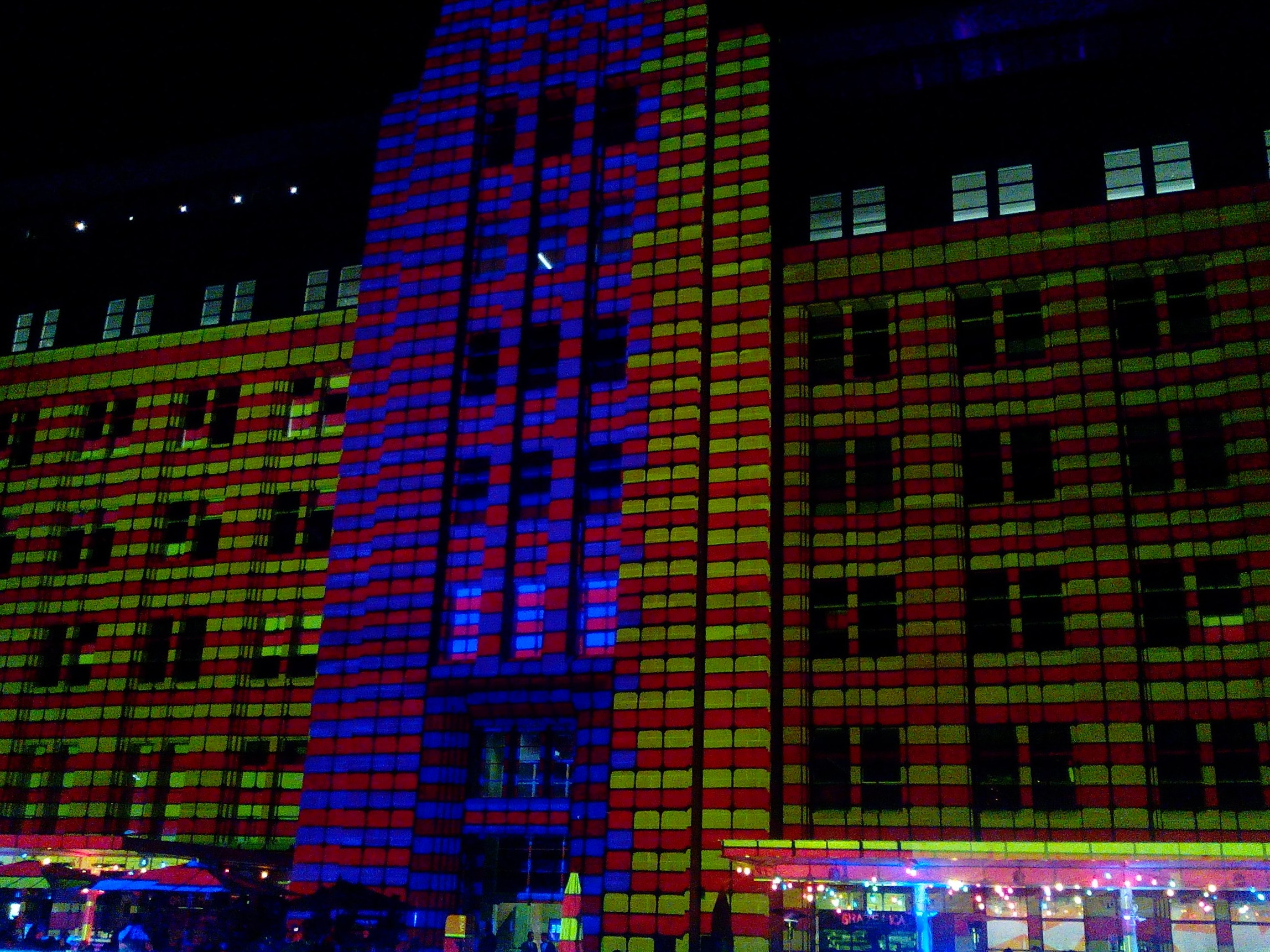
Museum of Contemporary Art

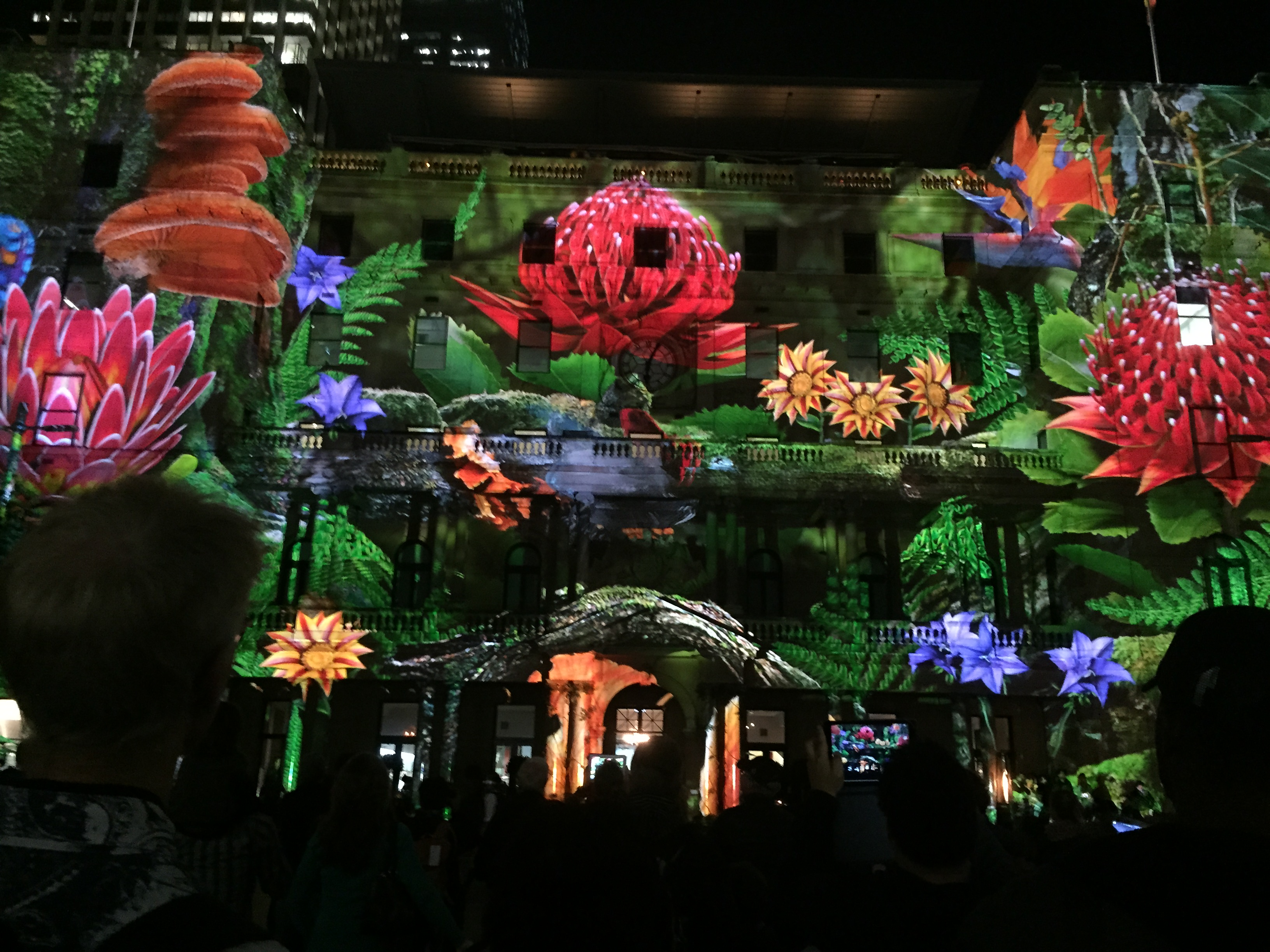
Customs House

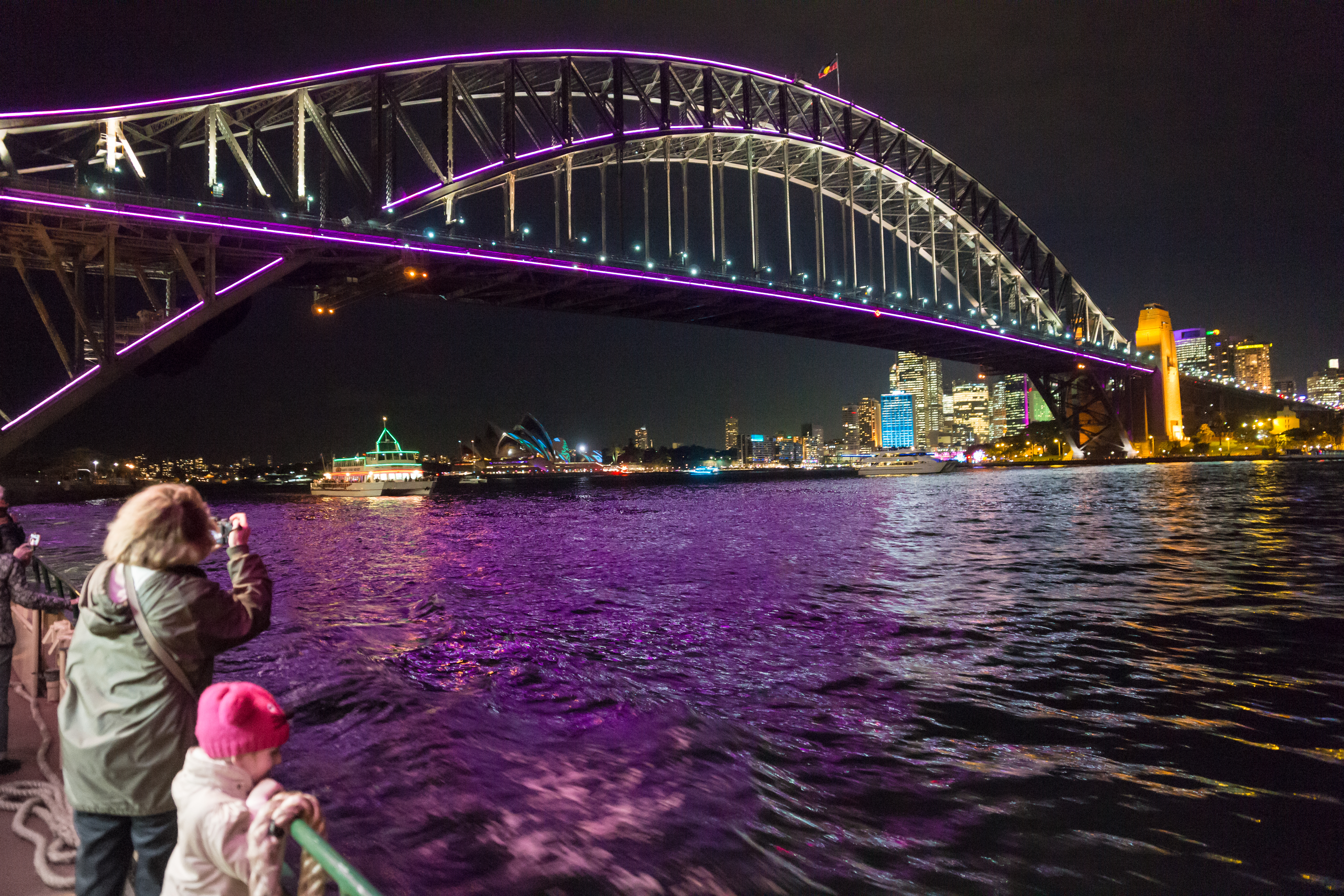
Tourists on Sydney Harbour during Vivid Sydney

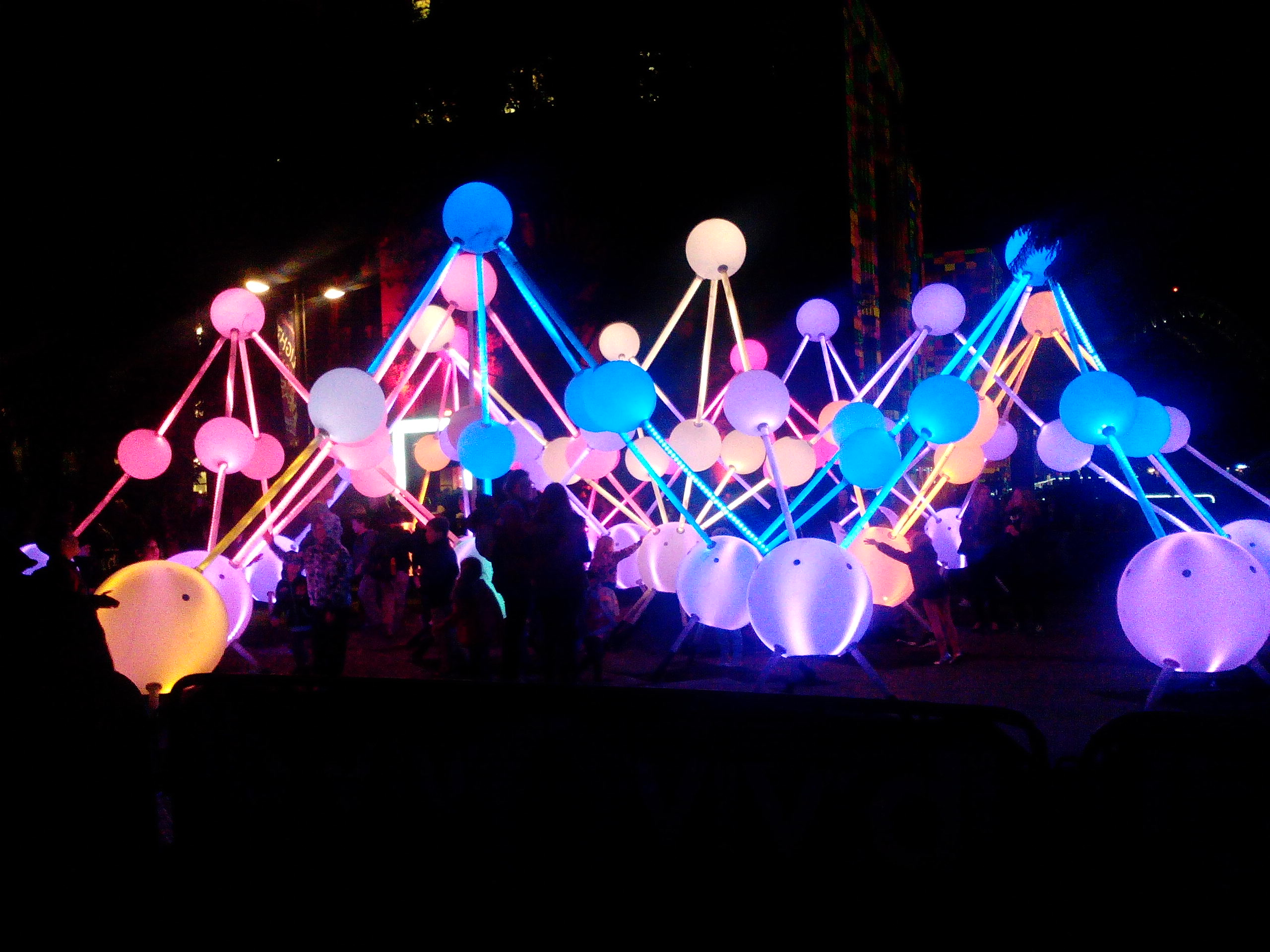
'Affinity' interactive sculpture

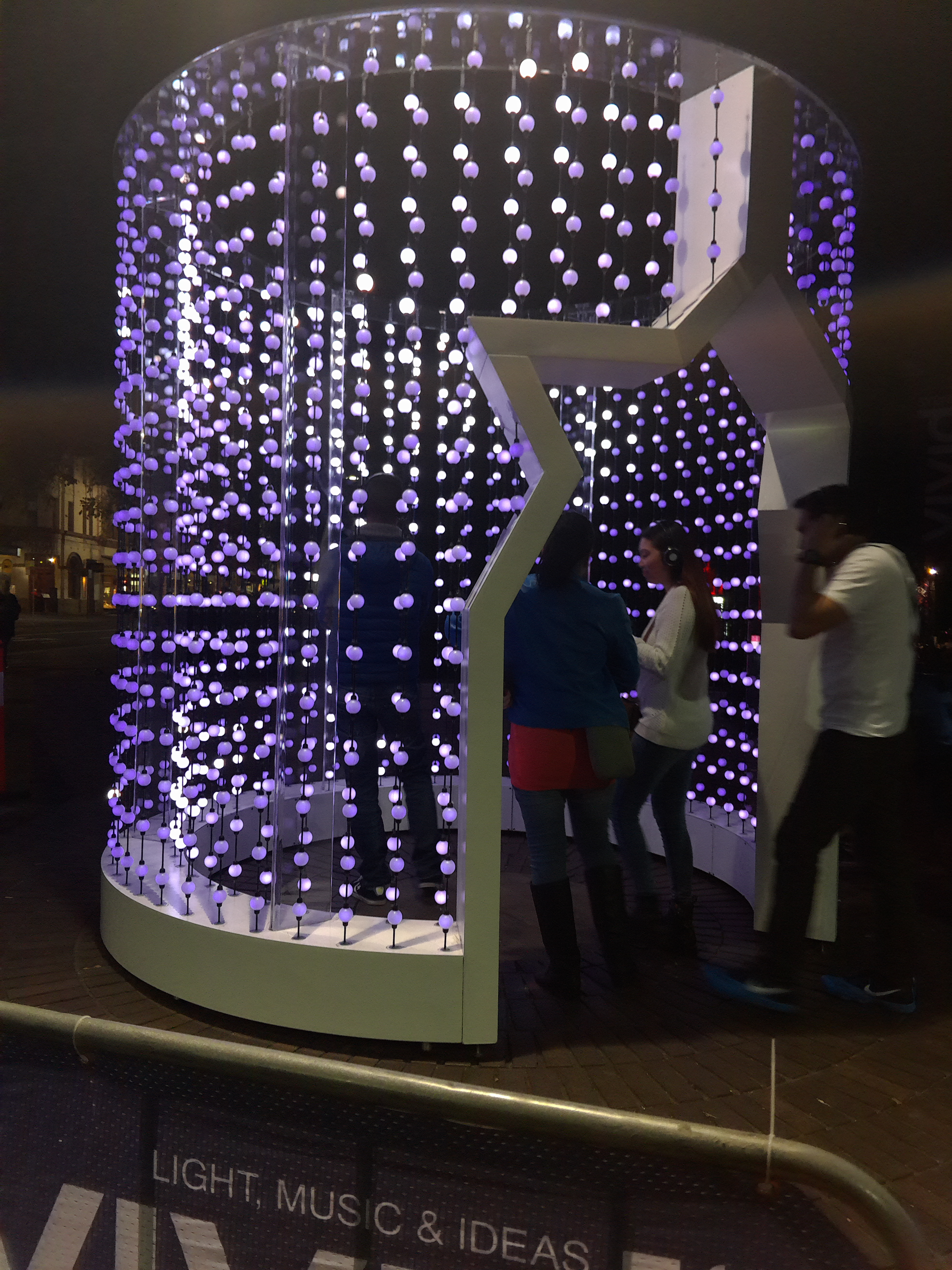
Space Folding

== See also ==
- Vivid Live
- Tourism in Sydney
- Culture of Sydney
- List of festivals in Australia
