= List of Scottish artists =

This is a list of notable artists born in Scotland and/or well known for their work in Scotland, arranged alphabetically by surname and by period.

== Born before 1700 ==
- John Alexander (died 1733), painter and engraver
- Arnold Bronckhorst (fl. 1565–1583), Dutch painter, the first King's Painter of Scotland
- William Gouw Ferguson (1632/3 – c. 1689), still life painter, active in France and Italy
- Gawen Hamilton (1698–1737), painter largely working in London
- George Heriot (1563–1624), Scottish goldsmith and jeweller
- George Jamesone (or Jameson, c. 1587–1644), Scotland's first eminent portrait painter
- David Paton, active 1660–1700, painter of miniatures
- François Quesnel (c. 1543–1619), Scotland-born French painter
- John Michael Wright (1617–1694), portrait painter in the Baroque style

== Born 1700–1799 ==
- Cosmo Alexander (c. 1724–1772), noted North American portrait painter
- David Allan (1744–1796), painter of historical subjects
- Andrew Bell (1726–1809), engraver and printer, co-founder of Encyclopædia Britannica
- John Zephaniah Bell (1794–1883), painter
- John Brown (1752–1787), artist
- Thomas Campbell (1790–1858), sculptor
- Alexander Carse (c. 1770–1843), painter known for scenes of Scottish life
- Robert Edmonstone (1794–1834), painter
- Robert Freebairn (1765–1808), landscape painter
- Andrew Geddes (1783–1844), portrait painter and etcher
- John Watson Gordon (1788–1864), painter
- Gavin Hamilton (1723–1798), Scottish neoclassical history painter
- David Ramsay Hay (1798–1866), artist, interior decorator and colour theorist
- Andrew Henderson (1783–1835), portrait painter
- John Kay (1742–1826), caricaturist and engraver
- William Home Lizars (1788–1859), painter and engraver
- William Miller (1796–1882), engraver
- Jacob More (1740–1793), landscape painter
- William Mossman, 1793–1851, sculptor
- Alexander Nasmyth (1758–1840), landscape painter
- Patrick Nasmyth (1787–1831), landscape painter, son of Alexander
- Jane Nasmyth (1788–1867), landscape painter, daughter of Alexander
- Barbara Nasmyth (1790–1870), landscape painter, daughter of Alexander
- Anne Nasmyth (1798–1874), landscape painter, daughter of Alexander
- Henry Raeburn (1756–1823), portrait painter
- Allan Ramsay (1713–1784), painter
- David Roberts (1796–1864), painter and lithographer
- Alexander Robertson (1772–1841), painter, brother of Andrew and Archibald
- Andrew Robertson (1777–1845), miniaturist painter
- Archibald Robertson (1765–1835), painter
- Alexander Runciman (1736–1785), painter of historical and mythical subjects
- John Runciman (1744–1768/9), painter known for Biblical and literary scenes, brother of Alexander
- Patrick Syme (1774–1845), flower-painter and color theorist
- Archibald Skirving (1749–1819), portrait painter
- Reverend John Thomson (1778–1840), landscape painter and minister of Duddingston Kirk
- William John Thomson RSA (1771–1845), portrait and miniaturist painter
- George Watson (1767–1837), painter
- David Wilkie (1785–1841), painter
- Hugh William Williams (1773–1829), landscape painter
- William Yellowlees (1796–1855), portrait painter

== Born 1800–1899 ==
- John Brown Abercromby (1843–1929), painter ranging from traditional portraiture to avant-garde modernism
- Patrick Adam (1852–1929), painter
- Robert Adamson (1821–1848), photographer
- John Macdonald Aiken (1880–1961), water-colourist and oil painter
- Lena Alexander (1899–1983), painter
- Jessie Algie (1859–1927), flower painter
- Andrew Allan (1863–1942), lithographer
- Robert Weir Allan (1851–1942), water-colour and oil painter of landscape and marine subjects
- Marion Ancrum (fl. 1885–1919), water-colour painter
- Hazel Armour (1894–1985), sculptor and medallist
- James Arroll (1862–1936), painter
- George Bain (1881–1968), art teacher whose writing revived interest in Celtic and Insular art
- James Ballantine (1806–1877), artist and author
- Penelope Beaton (1886–1963), painter
- Jemima Blackburn (1823–1909), painter and illustrator
- John Blair (c. 1849–1934), painter
- Muirhead Bone (1876–1953), etcher
- Phyllis Bone (1894–1972), sculptor
- William Bonnar (1800–1863), portraitist and history and genre painter
- William Brodie (1815–1881), sculptor
- Robert Brough (1872–1905), painter
- John Crawford Brown (1805–1867), landscape artist
- William Kellock Brown (1856–1934), sculptor
- Elizabeth York Brunton (1880 – c. 1960), painter
- Robert Bryden (1865–1939), artist, sculptor and engraver
- Thomas Stuart Burnett (1853–1888), sculptor
- Francis Campbell Boileau Cadell (1883–1937), member of the Scottish Colourists school
- James Cadenhead (1858–1927), painter
- Alexander Milne Calder (1846–1923), sculptor known for the architectural sculpture of Philadelphia City Hall
- Sir David Young Cameron (1865–1945), painter and etcher
- Mary Cameron (1865–1921), portraitist
- George Paul Chalmers (1833–1878), painter
- Thomas J Clapperton (1879–1962), sculptor
- James Cowie (1886–1956), painter
- Hugh Adam Crawford (1898–1982), painter
- William Crozier (1893–1930), landscape painter
- Jessie Alexandra Dick (1896–1976), painter and teacher
- Sir William Fettes Douglas (1822–1891), painter
- Thomas Millie Dow (1848–1919), painter, member of the Glasgow Boys school
- Jack M. Ducker (born 1890), painter specialising in Highland landscapes
- Ian Fairweather (1891–1974), Scottish/Australian painter
- Christian Jane Fergusson (1876–1957), Dumfries and Galloway landscape and still-life painter
- John Duncan Fergusson (1874–1961), member of the Scottish Colourists school
- Henry Snell Gamley (1865–1928), sculptor specialising in war memorials and tombs
- Robert Gavin (1827–1883), painter
- William Geissler (1894–1963), water-colourist of the natural world
- David Cooke Gibson (1827–1856), painter and poet
- James William Giles (1801–1870), Scottish landscape painter
- Sir William George Gillies (1898–1973), landscape and still-life painter
- Constance Frederica "Eka" Gordon-Cumming (1837–1924), travel writer and painter
- Mary Grant 1831–1908, sculptor
- Norah Neilson Gray (1882–1931), Glasgow School artist
- Herbert James Gunn (1893–1964), portraitist
- James Guthrie (1859–1930), painter
- Maggie Hamilton (1867–1952), painter
- Peter Alexander Hay (1866–1952)
- John Henderson (1860–1924), painter and Director of Glasgow School of Art
- Joseph Henderson (1832–1908), Scottish landscape painter
- George Henry (1858–1943), painter, one of the most prominent of the Glasgow School
- Joseph Morris Henderson (1863–1936), Scottish landscape painter
- Amelia Robertson Hill (née Paton, 1821–1904), sculptor and artist, wife of David Octavius
- David Octavius Hill (1802–1870), painter and photography pioneer as Hill & Adamson
- Edward Atkinson Hornel (1864–1933), painter of landscapes, flowers and foliage with children
- Anna Hotchkis (1885–1985), painter
- John Kelso Hunter (1802–1873), portrait painter and book author
- George Leslie Hunter (1877–1931), painter and Scottish Colourist
- Beatrice Huntington (1889–1988), artist, sculptor and musician
- John Hutchison, (1832–1910), sculptor
- Alexander Johnston (1815–1891), painter known for genre and history subjects
- Dorothy Johnstone (1892–1980), painter of landscapes and portraits, especially children
- Jeka Kemp (1876–1966), painter
- Annabel Kidston (1896–1981), painter
- Jessie M King (1875–1949), illustrator mainly of children's books, designer of jewellery and fabric
- Thomson Kirkwood (1820–1902), painter of landscapes and rural scenes
- Annie Rose Laing (1869–1946), painter
- Robert Scott Lauder (1803–1869), artist and portrait painter
- Andrew Law (1873–1967), artist and portrait painter
- William Mustart Lockhart (1855–1941), artist mainly of Glasgow-area landscapes in water-colours
- John Henry Lorimer (1856–1936), portraitist and genre painter, brother of the architect Robert Lorimer
- Robert Macaulay Stevenson (1854–1952), painter
- Robert Walker Macbeth (1848–1910), painter, water-colourist and print-maker
- Henry Macbeth-Raeburn (1860–1947), painter and print-maker
- Dugald MacColl (1859–1948)
- Frances MacDonald (1873–1921), Glasgow School artist, sister of Margaret
- Margaret MacDonald (1865–1933), Glasgow School artist, wife of Charles Rennie Mackintosh
- James MacGillivray (1856–1938), sculptor
- William York Macgregor (1855–1923), landscape artist
- Esther Blaikie MacKinnon (1885–1934), painter and engraver
- Charles Rennie Mackintosh (1868–1928), architect, designer, husband of Margaret MacDonald
- Chica Macnab (1889–1980), painter and wood engraver
- James Herbert MacNair (1868–1955), Glasgow School artist, designer and teacher
- Harrington Mann (1864–1937), portraitist and decorative painter, member of the Glasgow Boys movement
- George Manson (1850–1876), water-colourist
- James McBey (1883–1959), painter, etcher and war artist
- Horatio McCulloch (1806–1867), landscape painter
- R. R. McIan (1803–1856), painter
- William McTaggart (1835–1910), landscape painter
- Arthur Melville (1858–1904), painter remembered for Oriental subjects
- John Menzies (painter) (1871-1939), landscape and portrait painter
- James Coutts Michie (1859–1919), landscape and portrait painter
- John Maclauchlan Milne (1885 - 1957), landscape painter
- Thomas Corsan Morton (1859–1928), artist known as one of the Glasgow Boys
- James MacLauchlan Nairn (1859–1904), Glasgow-born painter who influenced late-19th-century New Zealand painting
- Charlotte Nasmyth (1804–1884), landscape painter, daughter of Alexander Nasmyth
- Jessie Newbery (1864–1948), Glasgow School artist and embroiderer
- James Campbell Noble (1846–1913), landscape and marine painter
- Robert Noble, (1857–1917), painter of landscapes, first President of the Society of Scottish Artists
- Emily Murray Paterson (1855–1934), painter
- James Paterson (1854–1932), landscape and portrait painter associated with The Glasgow Boys movement
- Viola Paterson (1899–1981), painter, wood engraver
- Sir Joseph Noel Paton (1821–1901), painter of religious subjects
- Samuel John Peploe (1871–1935), member of the Scottish Colourist school of painting
- Louisa Ellen Perman (1854-1921), floral painter with a focus on roses
- John Pettie (1839–1893), painter
- Sir George Pirie (1863–1946), artist associated with the Glasgow Boys in the 1880s
- John Quinton Pringle (1865–1925), painter influenced by Jules Bastien-Lepage and associated with the Glasgow Boys
- Annie Pirie Quibell (1862–1927), artist and archaeologist
- Arabella Rankin (1871 – c. 1935) painter and coloured woodcut artist
- Anne Redpath (1895–1967), artist best known for still life works
- Sir George Reid (1841–1913), landscape and portrait painter
- John Robertson Reid (1851–1926), painter
- John Stevenson Rhind (1859–1937), sculptor
- Robert Sivell (1888–1958), painter
- Sir John Robert Steell RSA (1804–1891), sculptor, including the statue of Sir Walter Scott at the Scott Monument
- David Watson Stevenson (1842–1904), sculptor of portraits and monuments in marble and bronze
- William Grant Stevenson (1849–1919), sculptor and painter
- David Macbeth Sutherland (1883–1973), painter of Scottish and Breton landscapes, and of portraits
- Adam Bruce Thomson (1885–1976), The Edinburgh School artist, landscape and portrait painter
- Ottilie Maclaren Wallace (1875–1947), sculptor
- Edward Arthur Walton (1860–1922), painter of landscapes and portraits
- Cecile Walton (1891–1956), painter, illustrator and sculptor
- George Fiddes Watt (1873–1960), portrait painter and engraver
- James Cromar Watt (1862–1940), artist, architect and jeweller
- Saul Yaffie (1898–1957), Jewish artist later known as Paul Jeffay

== Born 1900–1949 ==
- David Annand (born 1948), sculptor
- Gordon Robert Archibald (1905–1980), painter
- Eric Auld (1931–2013), painter
- Robert Bain (1911–1973), sculptor and art professor in South Africa
- Edward Baird (1904–1949), painter
- Barbara Balmer (1929–2017), painter
- Mardi Barrie (1930–2004), painter
- John Bellany (1942–2013), painter
- Helen Biggar (1909–1953), sculptor, film-maker and theatre designer
- Douglas Robertson Bisset (1908–2000), sculptor
- Sam Black (1913–1997)
- Robert Henderson Blyth (1919–1970)
- Leonard Boden (1911–1999), portrait painter
- Margaret Boden (1912–2001), painter
- John Boyd (1925–2018), milliner
- Mary Syme Boyd (1910–1997), artist and sculptor
- Jimmy Boyle (born 1944), sculptor, author and convicted murderer
- Mark Boyle (1934–2005)
- Howard Butterworth, painter working in Aberdeenshire since the 1960s
- John Byrne (1940-2023)
- W. Lindsay Cable (1900–1949), illustrator for Punch and Enid Blyton
- Robert Colquhoun (1914–1962), painter and print-maker
- Henry Robertson Craig (1916–1984) landscape and flower painter
- Victoria Crowe (born 1945)
- Richard Demarco (born 1930), artist and promoter of visual and performing arts
- David Abercrombie Donaldson (1916–1996), painter and limner to Her Majesty The Queen
- Margaret Cross Primrose Findlay (1902–1968), sculptor and modeller
- Ian Hamilton Finlay (1925–2006), sculptor and installation artist
- Hannah Frank (1908–2008), artist and sculptor
- Alison Cornwall Geissler MBE, (1907–2011), glass engraver
- Marianne Grant (1921–2007), artist
- Tom Gourdie (1913–2005), artist
- Alasdair Gray (1934–2019), artist and writer
- Thomas Symington Halliday (1902–1998), painter and sculptor
- Alison Kinnaird M.B.E (born 1949), glass artist, musician, teacher and writer
- Hew Lorimer (1907–1993), sculptor and brother of the architect Robert Lorimer
- Edwin G Lucas (1911–1990), painter
- Robert MacBryde (1913–1966), painter and theatre-set designer
- Hamish MacDonald (1935–2008), artist
- Rory McEwen (1932–1982), artist and musician
- George McGavin (1915–2004), painter
- William MacTaggart (1903–1981), landscape painter
- John Maxwell (1905–1962), painter of landscapes and imaginative subjects
- David Michie (1928–2015), painter
- James Morrison (1932–2020), landscape painter
- John Lowrie Morrison (born 1948), expressionist oil painter of Scottish landscapes
- Alberto Morrocco (1917–1998), artist
- Eduardo Paolozzi (1924–2005), sculptor
- James McIntosh Patrick (1907–1998), painter of landscapes and portraits
- Ronald Rae (born 1946), granite sculptor and artist
- Pat Semple (1939–2021), landscape artist
- Pamela So (1947–2010), multimedia artist and photographer
- Ancell Stronach (1901–1981), artist
- Alan Sutherland (1931–2019), portrait painter
- Alasdair Taylor (1934–2007), sculptor
- Sylvia Wishart (1936–2008), Orcadian landscape artist
- George Wyllie MBE (1921–2012), sculptor known for public art

== Born 1950–1999 ==
- Crawfurd Adamson (born 1953), figurative artist
- Charles Avery (born 1973), artist
- David Batchelor (born 1955)
- Karla Black (born 1972), sculptor nominated for 2011 Turner Prize
- Martin Boyce (born 1967), sculptor
- Hugh Buchanan (born 1958), water-colourist
- Roderick Buchanan (born 1965), artist working in film and photography
- Paul Carter (1970–2006) artist known for constructions
- Stephen Conroy (born 1964)
- Andrew Cranston (born 1969), painter
- Ken Currie (born 1960), English-born member of New Glasgow Boys
- Helen Denerley (born 1956), sculptor often reusing scrap
- Alan Dimmick (born 1956), photographer of the Glasgow art scene.
- Helen Douglas (book artist) (born 1952), book artist
- Kate Downie (born 1958), painter and print-maker
- Erica Eyres (born 1980), Canadian-born artist
- Lizzie Farey (born 1962), willow sculptor and artist
- Michael Fullerton (born 1971), portrait painter based in London
- Anya Gallaccio (born 1963), creator of minimalist installations
- Douglas Gordon (born 1966), winner of 1996 Turner Prize
- Andrew Grassie (born 1966), painter in tempera
- Claire Harrigan (born 1964), painter
- Peter Howson (born 1958), painter and official war artist
- Richard Johnson (born 1966), Scotland-born and educated war artist
- Anna King (born 1984), painter
- Henry Kondracki (born 1953), painter
- David Mach (born 1956), sculptor and installation artist
- John McKenna (born 1964), public artist, statue and monument creator
- Abigail McLellan (1969–2009), artist
- Susan Philipsz OBE (born 1965), sound installation artist, winner of 2010 Turner Prize
- Andy Scott (born 1964), figurative sculptor
- Lucy Skaer (born 1975), sculptor and painter
- Carol Rhodes (1959–2018), painter
- Evlynn Smith (1962–2003), artist, designer and furniture maker
- Alexander Stoddart (born 1959), neoclassical sculptor
- Thomson & Craighead (Alison Craighead born 1971), works with video and internet
- Jack Vettriano (born 1951), painter
- Alison Watt (born 1965), painter

== See also ==
- Art in Scotland
- List of Scottish women artists
