= List of painters by name beginning with "B" =

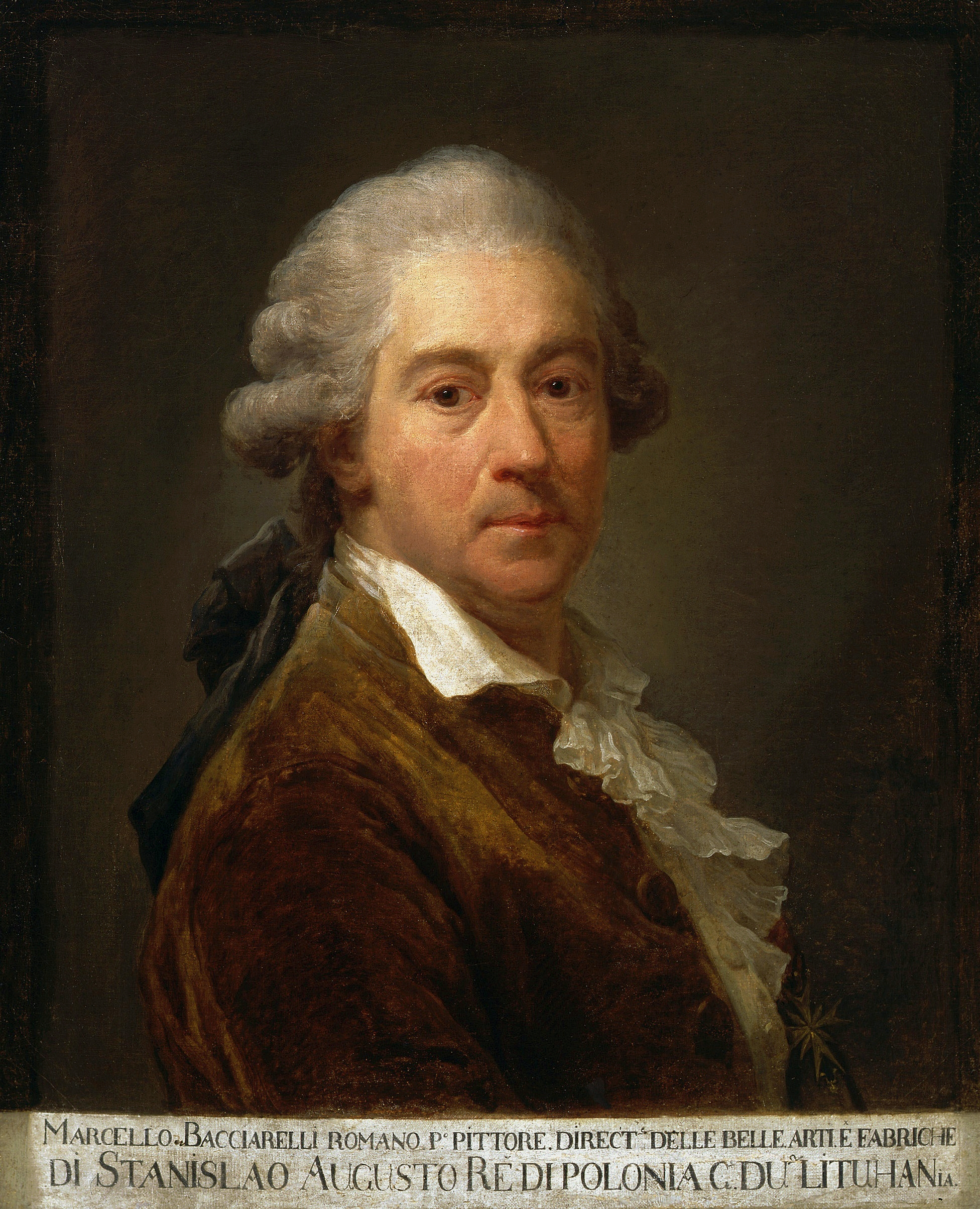
Marcello Bacciarelli

Please add names of notable painters with a Wikipedia page, in precise English alphabetical order, using U.S. spelling conventions. Country and regional names refer to where painters worked for long periods, not to personal allegiances.

- Dirck van Baburen (1595–1624), Dutch painter
- Jacopo Baccarini (1605–1682), Italian painter
- Johanna Juliana Friederike Bacciarelli (1733–1809 or later), German miniaturist and court painter
- Marcello Bacciarelli (1731–1818), Italian/Polish painter
- Irene Bache (1901–1999), English/Welsh painter
- Augustin Meinrad Bächtiger (1888–1971), Swiss painter
- Jacob Adriaensz Backer (1609–1651), Dutch painter
- Margaret Backhouse (1818–1888), English portrait painter
- Francis Bacon (1909–1992), Irish-born English painter
- Lucy Angeline Bacon (1857–1932), American painter
- Marjorie May Bacon (1902–1988), English painter and print-maker
- Peggy Bacon (1895–1987), American print-maker and painter
- Joseph Badger (ca. 1707–1765), American portrait painter
- Ottó Baditz (1849–1936), Hungarian painter
- Jan de Baen (1633–1702), Dutch portrait painter
- Jo Baer (born 1929), American minimalist painter
- William Jacob Baer (1860–1941), American miniature painter
- Stanley Bahe, Navajo American painter
- Leonard Bahr (1905–1990), American painter, muralist and illustrator
- Edward Bailey (1814–1903), American/Hawaiian landscape painter
- Alice Bailly (1872–1938), Swiss painter
- David Bailly (1584–1657), Dutch painter
- George Bain (1881–1968), Scottish artist and art teacher
- Robert Bain (1911–1973), Scottish/South African sculptor and art professor
- Thomas Baines (1820–1875), English painter and explorer
- Baiōken Eishun (梅翁軒永春, fl. 1710–1755), Japanese painter and print-maker
- Edward Baird (1904–1949), Scottish painter and draftsman
- Kōno Bairei (幸野楳嶺, 1844–1895), Japanese painter and illustrator
- Enrico Baj (1924–2003), Italian artist and writer on art
- James Ballantine (1806–1877), Scottish glass painter and poet
- Barbara Balmer (1929–2017), Scottish artist and art teacher
- Mario Bardi (1922–1998), Italian realist painter
- George Herbert Baker (1878–1943), American impressionist painter
- Normand Baker (1908–1955), Australian portrait painter
- William Bliss Baker (1859–1886), American painter
- Ludolf Bakhuizen (1631–1708), Dutch marine painter
- Léon Bakst (1866–1924), Russian/American painter and stage designer
- Alesso Baldovinetti (1427–1499), Italian painter
- Hans Baldung (1484–1545), German painter and print-maker
- Hendrick van Balen (1575–1632), Flemish painter and stained-glass designer
- Endre Bálint (1914–1986), Hungarian painter and graphic artist
- Rezső Bálint (1885–1945), Hungarian painter
- Pál Balkay (1785–1846), Hungarian painter and teacher
- Giacomo Balla (1871–1958), Italian painter and poet
- Robert Ballagh (born 1943), Irish painter and designer
- Karl Ballmer (1891–1958), Swiss painter and philosopher
- Barbara Balmer (1929–2017), Scottish painter and teacher
- János Nagy Balogh (1874–1919), Hungarian painter
- László Balogh (1930–2023), Hungarian painter
- Balthus (1908–2001), Polish/French artist
- Ernő Bánk (1883–1962), Hungarian painter, miniaturist and teacher
- Edward Mitchell Bannister (1828–1901), Canadian/American tonalist painter
- Bapu (1933–2014), Indian painter and film director
- Miklós Barabás (1810–1898), Hungarian painter
- Vladimir Baranov-Rossine (1888–1944), Russian/French avant-garde artist
- Jacopo de' Barbari (c. 1460/1470 – before 1516), Italian painter and print-maker
- Giovanni Francesco Barbieri (Guercino) (1591–1666), Italian painter and draftsman
- Jenő Barcsay (1900–1988), Hungarian painter
- James Bard (1815–1897), American watercraft painter
- Magdalene Bärens (1737–1808), Danish artist
- George Barker (1882–1965), American portrait and landscape artist
- Lucette Barker (1816–1905), English painter
- Thomas Barker (1769–1847), Welsh/English painter
- John Noble Barlow (1861–1917), English painter
- Gwen Barnard (1912–1988), English painter and print-maker
- Ernie Barnes (1938–2009), American artist and author
- Robert C. Barnfield (1856–1893), English/American painter
- Henri Alphonse Barnoin (1882–1940), French painter
- Federico Barocci (1535–1612) Italian painter and print-maker
- Martin Barooshian (1929-2022), American painter and printmaker
- Aimé Barraud (1902–1954), Swiss painter
- François Barraud (1899–1934), Swiss painter
- George Barret, Sr. (c. 1730 – 1784), Irish landscape painter
- George Barret, Jr. (1767–1842), English landscape painter (son of George Barret, Sr.)
- Syd Barrett (1946–2006), English painter and musician
- Mardi Barrie (1930–2004), Scottish painter and art teacher
- James Barry (1741–1806), Irish painter
- Hans von Bartels (1856–1913), German painter
- Richmond Barthé (1901 – c. 1990), American sculptor
- Lindsay Bartholomew (born 1944), English watercolor painter
- Charles W. Bartlett (1860–1940), English/Hawaiian painter and print-maker
- Jennifer Bartlett (born 1941), American artist
- Fra Bartolomeo (1474–1517), Italian religious painter
- Francesco Bartolozzi (1728–1815) Italian/English engraver
- Rose Maynard Barton (1856–1929), Irish/English painter
- Andor Basch (1885–1944), Hungarian painter
- Gyula Basch (1859–1928), Hungarian painter
- Evaristo Baschenis (1617–1677), Italian still-life painter
- Georg Baselitz (born 1938), German painter, sculptor and graphic artist
- Marie Bashkirtseff (1860–1884), Russian/French painter, sculptor and diarist
- Franz Karl Basler-Kopp (1879–1937), German/Swiss painter
- Jean-Michel Basquiat (1960–1988), American graffiti artist, painter and musician
- Jacopo Bassano (c. 1510 – 1592), Italian religious and genre painter
- Bartholomeus van Bassen (1590–1652), Dutch painter and architect
- James Bateman (1893–1959), English pastoral painter and engraver
- Robert Bateman (1842–1922), English painter and horticulturalist
- Robert Bateman (born 1930), Canadian painter and naturalist
- Maxwell Bates (1906–1980), Canadian expressionist painter and architect
- Pompeo Batoni (1708–1787), Italian painter
- John Nelson Battenberg (1931–2012), American sculptor
- Gyula Batthyány (1887–1959), Hungarian painter and graphic artist
- André Bauchant (1873–1958), French naïve painter
- Auguste Baud-Bovy (1848–1949), Swiss rural painter
- Lubin Baugin (c. 1611 – 1663), French still-life painter
- Edgar Schofield Baum (1916–2006), American painter, sculptor and poet
- Walter Emerson Baum (1884–1956), American artist and educator
- Fritz Baumann (1886–1942), Swiss painter
- Tilo Baumgärtel (born 1972), German painter
- Armin Baumgarten (born 1967), German painter and sculptor
- Walter Bayes (1869–1956), English painter and illustrator
- Wyke Bayliss (1835–1906), English painter, author and poet
- James Baynes (1766–1837), English water-color painter and draftsman
- Thomas Mann Baynes (1794–1854), English artist and lithographer
- Frédéric Bazille (1841–1870), French painter
- Reynolds Beal (1867–1951), American painter and etcher
- Sophia Beale (1837–1920), English painter and writer on art
- Romare Bearden (1914–1988), American artist and songwriter
- Penelope Beaton (1886–1963), Scottish water-colorist
- Robert Beauchamp (1923–1995), American painter and arts educator
- André Beauneveu (1335–1400), Netherlandish sculptor and painter
- Cecilia Beaux (1855–1942), American portrait painter
- Domenico di Pace Beccafumi (1486–1551), Italian painter
- Robert Bechtle (1932–2020), American painter
- Jasmine Becket-Griffith, American artist on acrylic, canvas and wood
- Clarice Beckett (1887–1935), Australian artist
- Max Beckmann (1884–1950), German painter, print-maker and sculptor
- Celia Frances Bedford (1904–1959), English portrait painter
- Ignat Bednarik (1882–1963), Romanian painter and illustrator
- Vanessa Beecroft (born 1969) Italian/American sculptor, painter and performance artist
- Tuvia Beeri (1929–2022) Czech/Israeli painter
- Cornelis Pietersz Bega (1620–1664), Dutch painter and engraver
- Abraham Begeyn (1637–1697), Dutch painter
- Kamāl ud-Dīn Behzād (born 1450), Persian painter
- Abraham van Beijeren (1620–1690), Dutch painter
- Zdzisław Beksiński (1929–2005), Polish painter, photographer and sculptor
- Andrew Bell (1726–1809), Scottish engraver and printer
- George Bell (1878–1966), Australian painter, teacher and violinist
- Gladys Kathleen Bell (1882–1965), English artist and miniature painter
- John Zephaniah Bell (1794–1883), Scottish/English artist
- Leland Bell (1922–1991), American painter
- Vanessa Bell (1879–1961), English painter and interior designer
- John Bellany (1942–2013), Scottish painter
- Alexis Simon Belle (1674–1734), French portrait painter
- Henri Bellechose (died before 1445), Netherlandish painter
- Giovanni Bellini (c. 1430 – 1516), Italian painter
- Gentile Bellini (c. 1429 – 1507), Italian painter
- Jacopo Bellini (c. 1400 – 1470), Italian painter
- Bernardo Bellotto (1721–1780), Italian landscape painter
- George Bellows (1882–1925), American realist painter
- Ludwig Bemelmans (1898–1962), Austrian/American children's illustrator and writer
- Gyula Benczúr (1844–1920), Hungarian painter and instructor
- Marilyn Bendell (1921–2003), American painter
- Wilhelm Bendz (1804–1832), Danish painter
- Manfredi Beninati (born 1970), Italian artist and sculptor
- Jason Benjamin (born 1971), Australian painter
- Martin Benka (1888–1977), Hungarian/Slovak painter
- Frank Weston Benson (1862–1951), American painter and etcher
- Thomas Hart Benton (1889–1975), American painter and muralist
- Alexandre Benois (1870–1960), Russian/Soviet/French artist and art critic
- Lajos Berán (1882–1943), Hungarian sculptor and medalist
- Jean Béraud (1849–1935), French painter
- Nicolaes Pieterszoon Berchem (1620–1683), Dutch painter
- Gerrit Adriaenszoon Berckheyde (1638–1698), Dutch painter
- Róbert Berény (1887–1953), Hungarian painter
- Marcelle Bergerol (1900–1989), French painter
- Christoffel van den Berghe (1590–1645), Flemish/Dutch painter
- Carlos Berlanga (1959–2002), Spanish painter, musician and composer
- Hans Eduard von Berlepsch-Valendas (1849–1921), Swiss/German painter, architect and designer
- Helen Berman (born 1936) Dutch/Israeli painter and textile designer
- Émile Bernard (1868–1941), French painter and writer
- Aurél Bernáth (1895–1982), Hungarian painter
- John E. Berninger (1896–1981), American painter
- Gian Lorenzo Bernini (1598–1680), Italian sculptor and architect
- Morris Louis Bernstein (1912–1962), American painter
- William Berra (born 1952), American painter
- Albert Bertelsen (1921–2019), Danish painter and graphic artist
- Johann Berthelsen (1883–1972), American painter
- Robert Bery (born 1953), American painter, photographer and sculptor
- Elsa Beskow (1874–1953), Swedish children's illustrator and writer
- Paul-Albert Besnard (1849–1934), French painter and print-maker
- Eleanor Best (1875–1958), English painter
- László Beszédes (1874–1922), Hungarian sculptor
- Joseph Beuys (1921–1986), German painter and performance artist
- Robert Bevan (1865–1925), English painter, draftsman and lithographer
- Henryka Beyer (1782–1855), German/Polish painter
- Riad Beyrouti (born 1944), Syrian/French painter
- Lujo Bezeredi (1898–1979), Hungarian/Croatian sculptor and painter
- Roman Bezpalkiv (1938–2009), Soviet/Ukrainian painter
- Bholekar Srihari (born 1941), Indian painter, sculptor and print-maker
- Bian Jingzhao (邊景昭, fl. 1426–1435), Chinese painter
- Bian Shoumin (边寿民, 1684–1752), Chinese painter
- Alessandro Galli Bibiena (1687–1769), Italian architect and painter
- Antonio Galli Bibiena (1700–1774), Italian architect and painter
- Carlo Galli Bibiena (1728–1787), Italian designer and painter
- Maria Oriana Galli Bibiena (1656–1749), Italian painter
- Heinrich Bichler (1466–1497), Swiss painter
- George Biddle (1885–1973), American painter, muralist and lithographer
- Hunter Biden (born 1970), American lawyer, lobbyist and painter
- Candido Bido (1936–2011), Dominican Republic painter
- Johann Jakob Biedermann (1763–1830), Swiss painter and etcher
- André Charles Biéler (1896–1989), Swiss/Canadian painter and teacher
- Ernest Biéler (1863–1948), Swiss painter, draftsman and print-maker
- Adolf Bierbrauer (1915–2012), German conceptual artist, painter and sculptor
- Albert Bierstadt (1830–1902), American painter
- Helen Biggar (1909–1953), Scottish sculptor and film-maker
- Sándor Bihari (1855–1906), Hungarian painter
- Jan van Bijlert (1597–1671), Dutch painter
- Ivan Bilibin (1876–1942), Russian/Soviet illustrator and stage designer
- Edmond Bille (1878–1959), Swiss painter, stained-glass artist and writer
- Ejler Bille (1910–2004), Danish artist
- Charles Billich (born 1934), Yugoslav/Croatian artist
- George Caleb Bingham (1811–1879), American artist and politician
- Margaret Bingham (1740–1814), English painter, copyist and poet
- Helen Binyon (1904–1979), English painter, illustrator and puppeteer
- S J "Lamorna" Birch (1869–1955), English painter
- Paul Bird (1923–1993), English artist and teacher
- Oswald Birley (1880–1952), English painter and portraitist
- Peter Birmann (1758–1844), Swiss painter
- Samuel Birmann (1793–1847), Swiss painter
- Thierry Bisch (born 1953), French artist
- Elmer Bischoff (1916–1991), American visual artist
- Tim Biskup (born 1967), American artist
- Giuseppe Bernardino Bison (1762–1844) Italian fresco and religious painter
- Vilhelm Bissen (1836–1913), Danish sculptor
- Douglas Robertson Bisset (1908–2000), Scottish sculptor
- Cornelis Bisschop (1630–1674), Dutch painter
- Emil Bisttram (1895–1976), American artist
- Henri Biva (1848–1929), French painter
- Mary Black (c. 1737 – 1814), English portrait painter
- Sam Black (1913–1997), Scottish artist
- Jemima Blackburn (1823–1909), Scottish painter and illustrator
- Ann Thetis Blacker (1927–2006), English painter and singer
- Vivien Blackett (born 1955), English artist
- Charles Blackman (1928–2018), Australian painter
- Basil Blackshaw (1932–2016), Northern Irish artist
- Doris Blair (born 1915), Northern Irish artist
- John Blair (painter) (1849–1934), Scottish painter
- William Blake (1757–1827), painter, poet and print-maker
- Zelma Blakely (1921–1978), English painter and print-maker
- Ralph Albert Blakelock (1847–1919), American painter
- Edmund Blampied (1886–1966), Jersey/English artist and etcher
- Arnold Blanch (1896–1968), American painter, etcher and lithographer
- Jacques Blanchard (1600–1638), French painter
- Ross Bleckner (born 1949), American painter
- Johann Heinrich Bleuler (1758–1823), Swiss painter and porcelain designer
- Johann Ludwig Bleuler (1792–1850), Swiss landscape painter and publisher
- Carl Heinrich Bloch (1834–1890), Danish painter
- Anna Katharina Block (1642–1719), German painter
- Benjamin Block (1631–1690), German painter
- Josef Block (1863–1943), German painter
- Abraham Bloemaert (1566–1651), Dutch painter, print-maker and engraver
- Hendrick Bloemaert (1601–1672), Dutch painter
- Flavia Blois (1914–1980), English landscape painter
- Tina Blondell (born 1953), Austrian/American painter
- Hyman Bloom (1913–2009), Latvian/American painter
- Pieter de Bloot (1601–1658), Dutch painter
- Godfrey Blow (born 1948), Australian Stuckist artist
- Peter Blume (1906–1992), American painter and sculptor
- Ditlev Blunck (1798–1854), Danish/German painter
- Robert Henderson Blyth (1919–1970), Scottish painter
- David Gilmour Blythe (1815–1865), American painter and poet
- Umberto Boccioni (1882–1916), Italian painter and sculptor
- Anna Boch (1848–1936), Belgian painter
- François Bocion (1828–1890), Swiss painter, designer and art professor
- Thomas Bock (1793–1855), English/Australian artist and photographer
- Arnold Böcklin (1827–1901), Swiss symbolist painter
- Margaret Boden (1912–2001), Scottish painter and illustrator
- Karl Bodmer (1809–1893), Swiss/French print-maker, etcher and lithographer
- Paul Bodmer (1886–1983), Swiss painter
- Erik Bodom (1829–1879), Norwegian painter
- Zsolt Bodoni (born 1975), Romanian (Hungarian) painter
- Edward Marshall Boehm (1913–1969), American sculptor and porcelain maker
- George Bogart (1933–2005), American painter
- Krzysztof Boguszewski (1906–1988), Polish painter
- Pál Böhm (1839–1905), Hungarian/German painter
- Aaron Bohrod (1907–1992), American painter
- Louis-Léopold Boilly (1761–1845), French painter and draftsman
- Maurice Boitel (born 1919), French painter
- Ferdinand Bol (1616–1680), Dutch painter, etcher and draftsman
- Hans Bol (1534–1593), Flemish painter, miniaturist and draftsman
- Kees Bol (1916–2009), Dutch painter and art educator
- Giovanni Boldini (1842–1931), Italian/French painter
- Boetius Adamsz Bolswert (1585–1633), German Frisian/Dutch copperplate engraver
- Schelte a Bolswert (1586–1659), Dutch engraver
- Irvin Bomb (born 1967), American painter, illustrator and film-maker
- David Bomberg (1890–1957), English painter
- Camille Bombois (1883–1970), French naïve painter
- Muirhead Bone (1876–1953), Scottish etcher and water-colorist
- Phyllis Bone (1894–1972), Scottish sculptor
- Stephen Bone (1904–1958), English painter and broadcaster
- Isidore Bonheur (1827–1901), French sculptor
- Rosa Bonheur (1822–1899), French painter and sculptor
- Hugo Sánchez Bonilla (born 1940), Costa Rican artist
- Claude Bonin-Pissarro (1921–2021), French painter and graphic designer
- Richard Parkes Bonington (1802–1828), English/French landscape painter
- William Bonnar (1800–1863), Scottish painter and draftsman
- Pierre Bonnard (1867–1947), French painter, illustrator and print-maker
- Francesco Bonsignori (1460–1519), Italian painter and draftsman
- Gerard ter Borch (1617–1681), Dutch genre painter
- Paul-Émile Borduas (1905–1960), Canadian abstract painter
- Adolf Born (1930–2016) Czechoslovak/Czech painter, illustrator and caricaturist
- Vladimir Borovikovsky (1757–1825), Russian portrait painter
- József Borsos (1821–1883), Hungarian portrait painter and photographer
- Miklós Borsos (1906–1990), Hungarian sculptor
- Sándor Bortnyik (1893–1976), Hungarian painter and graphic designer
- Samu Börtsök (1881–1931), Hungarian painter
- Kameda Bōsai (亀田鵬斎, 1752–1826), Japanese nanga painter
- Hieronymus Bosch (c. 1450 – 1516), Dutch/Netherlandish painter
- Abraham Bosschaert (1612–1643), Dutch painter
- Ambrosius Bosschaert (1573–1621), Dutch still-life painter
- Ambrosius Bosschaert II (1609–1645), Dutch flower painter
- Johannes Bosschaert (1610–1650), Dutch still-life painter
- Ángel Botello (1913–1986), Spanish/Puerto Rican painter, sculptor and graphic artist
- Fernando Botero (1932–2023), Colombian artist and sculptor
- Andries Both (1612–1641), Dutch genre painter
- Jan Dirksz Both (1610–1652), Dutch painter, draftsman and etcher
- Sandro Botticelli (1445–1510), Italian painter
- François Boucher (1703–1770), French painter, draftsman and etcher
- Eugène Boudin (1824–1898), French landscape painter
- William-Adolphe Bouguereau (1825–1905), French academic painter
- Jack Boul (born 1917), American painter
- Gustave Boulanger (1824–1888), French figure painter
- Doris Boulton-Maude (1892–1961), English engraver, etcher and print-maker
- Douglas Bourgeois (born 1951), American figurative painter
- Francis Bourgeois (1753–1811), English landscape and history painter
- John Bourne (born 1943), English/Welsh artist and Stuckist painter
- Esaias Boursse (1631–1672), Dutch genre painter
- Dieric Bouts (1420–1475), Netherlandish painter
- Camille Bouvagne (1864–1936), French painter
- Carol Bove (born 1971), American artist
- Erwin Bowien (1899–1972), German painter
- Eden Box (1919–1988), English painter
- Zlatyu Boyadzhiev (1903–1976), Bulgarian painter
- Arthur Boyd (1920–1999), Australian painter
- Arthur Merric Boyd (1862–1940), Australian painter
- David Boyd (1924–2011), Australian artist
- Mary Syme Boyd (1910–1997), Scottish painter and sculptor
- Penleigh Boyd (1890–1923), Australian artist
- Jimmy Boyle (born 1944), Scottish sculptor and novelist
- Mark Boyle (1934–2005), Scottish painter and sculptor
- Olga Boznańska (1865–1940), Polish painter
- Dorothea Braby (1909–1987), English artist and illustrator
- John Brack (1920–1999), Australian painter
- Robert Brackman (1898–1980), American artist and teacher
- Marie Bracquemond (1841–1916), French impressionist painter
- Dorothy Bradford (1918–2008), English painter and print-maker
- Dorothy Elizabeth Bradford (1897–1986), English painter
- Leonaert Bramer (1596–1674), Dutch religious and history painter
- Christian Hilfgott Brand (1694–1756), German landscape painter
- Johann Christian Brand (1722–1795), Austrian painter
- Peter Brandes (born 1944), Danish painter, sculptor and ceramicist
- Petr Brandl (1668–1739), Bohemian painter
- Warren Eugene Brandon (1916–1977), American painter and photographer
- Eugène Brands (1913–2002), Dutch painter
- Józef Brandt (1841–1915), Polish painter
- Muriel Brandt (1909–1981), Irish painter
- Ruth Brandt (1936–1989), Irish artist and teacher
- Georges Braque (1882–1963), French painter, print-maker and sculptor
- Arnold Franz Brasz (1888–1966), American painter, sculptor and print-maker
- Maurice Braun (1877–1941), American landscape painter
- Victor Brauner (1903–1966), Romanian sculptor and surrealist painter
- Robert J. Brawley (1936–2006), American painter
- Jan de Bray (1627–1697), Dutch painter
- Dirck de Bray (c. 1635 – 1694), Dutch painter
- Phyllis Bray (1911–1991), English mural painter
- Salomon de Bray (1597–1664), Dutch painter and architect
- Carl Frederik von Breda (1759–1818), Swedish painter
- Bartholomeus Breenbergh (1598–1657), Dutch painter of Italian landscapes
- George Hendrik Breitner (1857–1923), Dutch painter and photographer
- Quirijn van Brekelenkam (1622–1670), Dutch genre painter
- Mark A. Brennan (born 1968), Canadian landscape painter
- Art Brenner (1924–2013), American abstract sculptor and painter
- Louise Catherine Breslau (1856–1927), Swiss/French painter and print-maker
- Jules Breton (1827–1906), French naturalist painter
- David Brewster (born 1960), American painter
- James E. Brewton (1930–1967), American painter and print-maker
- Breyten Breytenbach (born 1939), South African writer and painter
- Gabor Breznay (born 1956), Hungarian/French painter
- József Breznay (1916–2012), Hungarian painter
- Alfred Thompson Bricher (1837–1908), American painter
- Louis Briel (1945–2021), American painter
- Ernest Briggs (1923–1984), American painter
- Henry Bright (1810–1873), English painter
- Pierre Brissaud (1885–1964), French illustrator, painter and engraver
- Károly Brocky (1808–1855), Hungarian/English painter
- Louis le Brocquy (1916–2012), Irish painter
- Heinrich Brocksieper (1898–1968), German photographer, painter and film-maker
- William Brodie (1815–1881), Scottish sculptor
- Antoni Brodowski (1784–1832), Polish painter
- Sándor Brodszky (1819–1901), Hungarian painter
- Melchior Broederlam (1350 – post-1409), Netherlandish painter
- Arnold Bronckhorst (fl. 1565–1583), Dutch painter, first King's Painter of Scotland
- Agnolo Bronzino (1503–1572), Italian mannerist painter
- Alexander Brook (1898–1980), American artist and art critic
- Peter Brook (1927–2009), English painter
- Bertram Brooker (1888–1955), Canadian painter
- Allan Brooks (1869–1946), Canadian bird artist and ornithologist
- Frank Leonard Brooks (born 1911), Canadian artist
- James Brooks (1906–1992), American muralist and painter
- Romaine Brooks (1874–1970), American portrait painter
- Robert Brough (1872–1905), Scottish painter
- Adriaen Brouwer (1605–1638), Flemish painter
- Cecily Brown (born 1969), English/American painter
- Ford Madox Brown (1821–1893), English painter
- John Brown (c. 1752 – 1787), Scottish artist and draftsman
- John Crawford Brown (1805–1867), Scottish landscape painter
- Lucy Madox Brown (1843–1894), English artist, author and model
- Francis Focer Brown (1891–1971), American painter
- Joan Brown (1938–1990), American figurative painter
- Judith Brown (1931–1992), American sculptor and dancer
- Nyuju Stumpy Brown (1924–2011), Australian painter and cultural figure
- Kathleen Browne (1905–2007), New Zealand painter
- Mia Brownell (born 1971), American painter
- Václav Brožík (1851–1901), Czech/French painter
- Patrick Henry Bruce (1881–1936), American painter
- Lajos Bruck (1846–1910), Hungarian painter
- Lodewijk Bruckman (1903–1995), Dutch magic realist painter
- Jan Brueghel the Elder (1568–1625), Flemish painter and draftsman
- Jan Brueghel the Younger (1601–1678), Flemish painter
- Pieter Bruegel the Elder (c. 1525 – 1569), Dutch painter and print-maker
- Pieter Brueghel the Younger (1564–1638), Flemish painter
- Marjorie Frances Bruford (1902–1958), English painter
- Arnold Brügger (1888–1975), Swiss painter
- Élisabeth Vigée Le Brun (1755–1842), French painter
- Elizabeth York Brunton (1880 – c. 1960), Scottish painter and woodcut artist
- Barthel Bruyn the Elder (1493–1555), Germain painter
- Barthel Bruyn the Younger (c. 1530 – 1607/1610), German painter
- Robert Bryden (1865–1939), Scottish painter, engraver and sculptor
- Karl Bryullov (1799–1852), Russian painter
- Tadeusz Brzozowski (1818–1887), Polish painter
- Ernest Buckmaster (1897–1968), Australian artist
- Ota Bubeníček (1871–1962), Czech landscape painter
- Emanuel Büchel (1705–1775), Swiss painter
- Frank Buchser (1828–1890), Swiss painter
- David Budd (1927–1991), American painter
- Karl Buesgen (1917–1981), American landscape painter
- Bernard Buffet (1928–1999), French expressionist painter
- Vlaho Bukovac (1855–1922), Austro-Hungarian/Yugoslav/Croatian painter
- Norma Bull (1906–1980), Australian painter and print-maker
- Johann Balthasar Bullinger (1713–1793), Swiss landscape painter
- Fritz Bultman (1919–1985), American painter, sculptor and collagist
- Erol Bulut (1955–2021), Turkish painter
- John Elwood Bundy (1853–1933), American painter
- Dennis Miller Bunker (1861–1890), American painter
- Charles Ragland Bunnell (1897–1968), American painter, print-maker and muralist
- Rupert Bunny (1864–1947), Australian painter
- Mykola Burachek (1871–1942), Russian/Soviet painter and pedagogue
- Elbridge Ayer Burbank (1858–1949), American portrait painter
- Charles E. Burchfield (1893–1967), American painter and visionary artist
- Jacob Burck (1907–1982), Polish/American painter, sculptor and cartoonist
- Hans Burgkmair (1473–1531), German painter and print-maker
- Francisco de Burgos Mantilla (1612–1672), Spanish painter
- Max Buri (1868–1915), Swiss painter
- Zdeněk Burian (1905–1981), Moravian/Czechoslovak painter
- Rodney Joseph Burn (1899–1984), English painter
- Eugène Burnand (1850–1921), Swiss painter and illustrator
- Thomas Stuart Burnett (1853–1888), Scottish sculptor
- Dorothy Burroughes (1883–1963), English painter, illustrator and lino-cut artist
- Alberto Burri (1915–1995) Italian painter, sculptor and physician
- David Burton-Richardson (born 1961), Welsh artist and poet
- Sergio Burzi (1901–1954), Italian painter and illustrator
- Mildred Anne Butler (1858–1941), Irish painter
- Theodore Earl Butler (1861–1936), American painter
- Ambreen Butt (born 1969), Pakistani/American painter, draftsman and collagist
- Howard Butterworth (living), Scottish painter
- R. Butter, American Landscape Artist, (1800s) need more info**
- John Button (1930–1982), American artist
- Louis Buvelot (1814–1888), Swiss/Australian painter
- Willem Pieterszoon Buytewech (1591–1624), Dutch painter, draftsman and etcher
- Byeon Sang-byeok (변상벽, fl. mid-18th c.), Korean painter
- Mary Byfield (1795–1871), English book illustrator and wood engraver
- John Byrne (1786–1847), English painter and engraver
- John Byrne (1940–2023), Scottish painter and playwright
- Johann Rudolf Byss (1660–1738), Swiss painter
