= List of painters by name beginning with "H" =

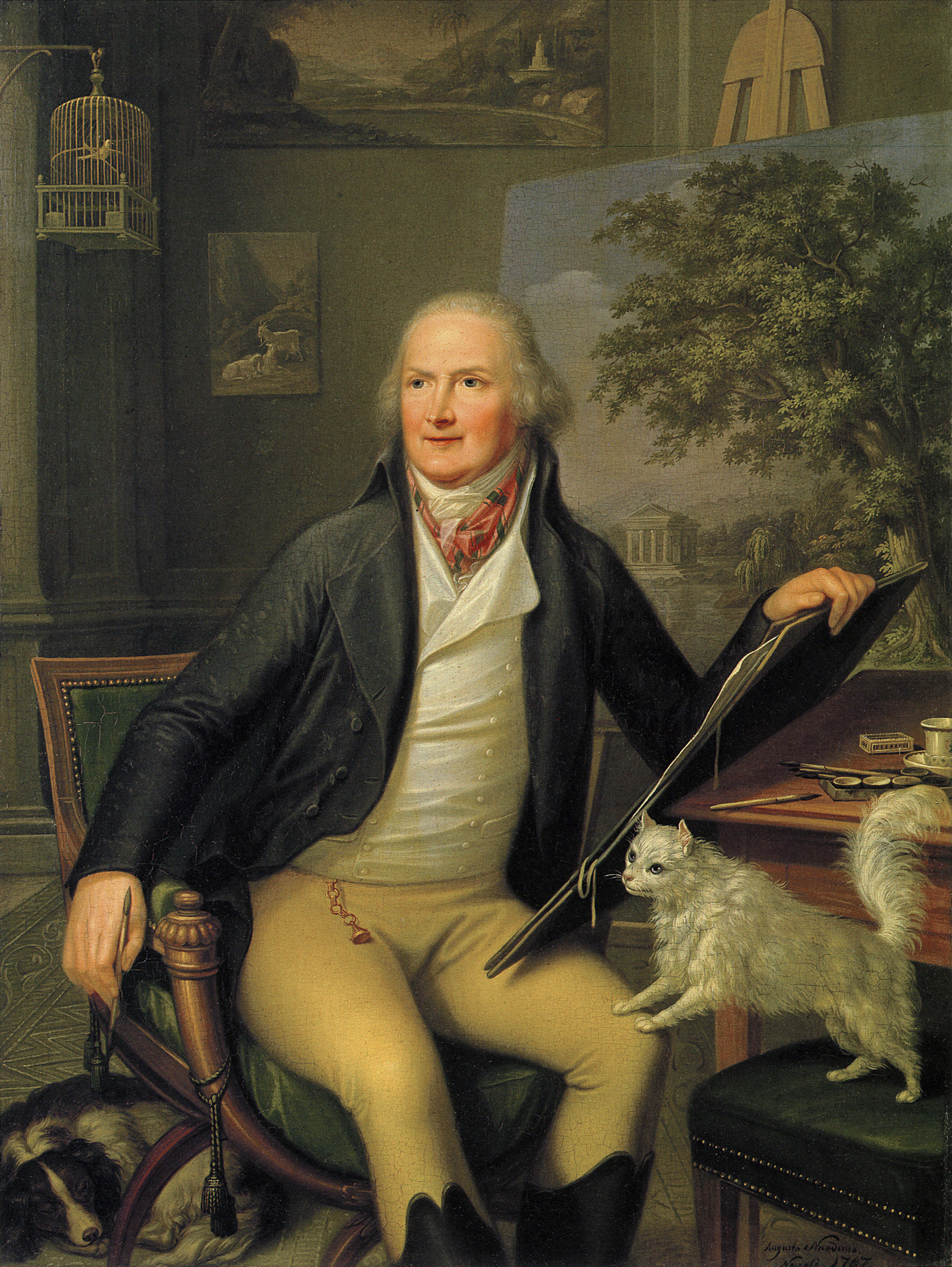
Jacob Philipp Hackert

Please add names of notable painters with a Wikipedia page, in precise English alphabetical order, using U.S. spelling conventions. Country and regional names refer to where painters worked for long periods, not to personal allegiances.

- Joris van der Haagen (c. 1615–1669), Dutch painter
- Cornelis van Haarlem (1562–1638), Dutch painter and draftsman
- John Haberle (1858–1933), American painter
- Jan Hackaert (1628–1685), Dutch painter
- Jacob Philipp Hackert (1737–1807), German/Italian landscape painter
- Johannes van Haensbergen (1642–1705), Dutch painter
- Karl Hagedorn (1889–1969), German/English painter and illustrator
- Karl Hagedopoorn (1922–2005), German/American painter, lithographer and etcher
- Sally Haley (1908–2007), American painter
- Adélaïde Victoire Hall (1772–1844), French artist and noblewoman
- Patrick Hall (1906–1992), English landscape painter
- Thomas Symington Halliday (1902–1998), Scottish painter and sculptor
- Hallsteinn Sigurðsson (born 1945), Icelandic sculptor and artist
- Dirck Hals (1591–1656), Dutch painter
- Frans Hals (1580–1666), Dutch painter
- Elaine Hamilton (1920–2010), American painter and muralist
- Gavin Hamilton (1723–1798), Scottish/Italian painter
- Gawen Hamilton (1698–1737), Scottish/English painter
- Maggie Hamilton (1867–1952), Scottish painter
- Richard Hamilton (1922–2011), English painter and collage artist
- Doc Hammer (born 1978), American artist, musician and actor
- Wilhelm Hammershøi (1864–1916), Danish painter
- Frederick Hammersley (1919–2009), American painter
- Hermione Hammond (1910–2005), English painter
- Nina Hamnett (1890–1956), Welsh artist and writer
- Han Gan (韩干/韓幹, 706–783), Chinese painter
- Raymond Han (1931–2017), American painter
- Hanabusa Itchō (英一蝶, 1652–1724), Japanese painter, calligrapher and poet
- Hanabusa Itchō II (二代英一蝶, 1677–1737), Japanese painter
- Jakob Emanuel Handmann (1718–1781), Swiss portrait painter
- Jakob Häne (1913–1978), Swiss painter
- Adriaen Hanneman (1603–1671), Dutch painter
- Armin Hansen (1886–1957), American painter
- Constantin Hansen (1804–1880), Danish painter
- William Harnett (1848–1892), American painter
- Henri Harpignies (1819–1916), French landscape painter
- George Frederick Harris (1856–1924), Welsh/Australian painter
- Lawren Harris (1885–1970), Canadian painter
- Lawrence Harris (born 1937), American painter
- Tracy Harris (born 1958), American painter
- Marsden Hartley (1877–1943), American painter, poet and essayist
- Archibald Standish Hartrick (1864–1950), Scottish painter and print-maker
- Hans Hartung (1904–1992), German/French painter
- Gertrude Harvey (1879–1966), English painter
- Harold Harvey (1874–1941), English painter
- Paul Harvey (born 1960), English artist and musician
- Hasegawa Settan (長谷川雪旦, died 1843), Japanese artist
- Hasegawa Tōhaku (長谷川等伯, 1539–1610), Japanese painter
- Maryam Hashemi (born 1977), Iranian/English painter
- Hashimoto Gahō (橋本雅邦, 1835–1908), Japanese painter
- Childe Hassam (1859–1935), American painter
- Fathi Hassan (born 1597), Arab/Scottish installation artist
- Julius Hatofsky (1922–2006), American painter
- Julian Hatton (born 1956), American artist
- Haukur Halldórsson (born 1937), Icelandic artist and illustrator
- Lars Jonson Haukaness (1863–1929), Norwegian/Canadian painter and art instructor
- Rudolf Hausner (1914–1995), Austrian painter, draftsman and sculptor
- Sam Havadtoy (born 1952), Hungarian/American interior designer and painter
- Karel Havlíček (1907–1988), Czech painter
- Jane Hawkins (1841–1904), English portrait painter
- David Ramsay Hay (1798–1866), Scottish artist and interior decorator
- Peter Alexander Hay (1866–1952), Scottish water-colorist
- Gyoshū Hayami (速水御舟, 1894–1935), Japanese painter
- Colin Hayes (1919–2003), English painter and teacher of art
- Francesco Hayez (1791–1882), Italian painter
- Martin Johnson Heade (1818–1904), American painter
- Isobel Heath (1908–1989), English painter and poet
- Ernest Hébert (1817–1908), French academic painter
- Jeanne Hébuterne (1898–1920), French painter and model
- Erich Heckel (1883–1970), German painter and print-maker
- Willem Claeszoon Heda (1594–1680), Dutch painter
- Cornelis de Heem (1631–1695), Flemish/Dutch painter
- Jan Davidsz. de Heem (1606–1683), Dutch/Flemish painter
- Egbert van Heemskerck (1610–1680), Dutch/English painter
- Henry Heerup (1907–1993), Danish painter and sculptor
- Franz Hegi (1774–1850), Swiss painter
- François Joseph Heim (1787–1865), French painter
- Wilhelm Heise (1892–1965), German painter
- Johannes Heisig (born 1953), German painter and graphic artist
- Bettina Heinen-Ayech (1937–2020), German painter
- Joseph Heintz the Elder (1564–1609), Swiss/Bohemian painter, draftsman and architect
- Jean Hélion (1904–1987), French painter
- Dirk Helmbreker (1633–1696), Dutch painter
- Gottfried Helnwein (born 1948), Austrian/Irish painter and draftsman
- Francis Helps (1890–1972), English painter, draftsman and art teacher
- Bartholomeus van der Helst (1613–1670), Dutch painter
- Jan Davidsz de Hem (1606–1683), Flemish/Dutch painter
- Andrew Henderson (1783–1835), Scottish painter
- Elsie Henderson (1880–1967), English painter and sculptor
- Jeremy Henderson (1952–2009), Irish/English painter
- John Henderson (1860–1924), Scottish painter and Director of the Glasgow School of Art
- Joseph Henderson (1832–1908), Scottish painter
- Keith Henderson (1883–1982), Scottish painter and illustrator
- Maxwell Hendler (born 1938), American painter
- Raymond Hendler (1923–1998), American action painter
- Jean-Jacques Henner (1829–1905), French painter
- Joseph Morgan Henninger (1906–1999), American painter, sculptor and illustrator
- Robert Henri (1865–1929), American painter and teacher
- Rose Henriques (1889–1972), English artist and charity worker
- David Eugene Henry (born 1946), American painter and sculptor
- Edward Lamson Henry (1841–1919), American painter
- George Henry (1858–1943), Scottish painter
- Paul Henry (1877–1958), Irish landscape painter
- Norman Hepple (1908–1994), English portrait painter
- Auguste Herbin (1882–1960), French painter
- Hubert von Herkomer (1849–1914), German/English painter, film director and composer
- George Herms, (born 1935), American assemblagist, teacher, painter
- John Frederick Herring, Jr. (1820–1907), English painter
- John Frederick Herring, Sr. (1795–1865), English painter, sign-maker and coachman
- Louis Hersent (1777–1860), French painter
- Heinrich Herzig (1887–1964), Swiss painter
- F. Scott Hess (born 1955), American painter and conceptual artist
- Carle Hessay (1911–1978), German/Canadian painter
- Magnus Colcord Heurlin (1895–1986) Swedish/American artist
- Jacob de Heusch (1657–1701), Dutch painter
- Prudence Heward (1896–1947), Canadian painter
- Elsie Dalton Hewland (1901–1979), English artist
- Cicely Hey (1896–1980), English painter and sculptor
- Jean Hey (fl. 1475–1505), Netherlandish/Burgundian painter
- Jan van der Heyden (1637–1712), Dutch painter, draftsman and print-maker
- Hugo Heyrman (born 1942), Belgian painter, film-maker and researcher
- Edward Hicks (1780–1849), American painter and Quaker minister
- Hidari Jingorō (左甚五郎, fl. 1596–1644), Japanese artist, possibly fictitious
- Kaii Higashiyama (東山魁夷, 1908–1999), Japanese artist and writer
- Amelia Robertson Hill (1821–1904), Scottish artist and sculptor
- David Octavius Hill (1802–1870), Scottish painter and illustrator
- Derek Hill (1916–2000), English/Irish painter
- Thomas Hill (1829–1908), English/American painter
- Nicholas Hilliard (c. 1547–1619), English miniature painter, goldsmith and limner
- Charles Hinman (born 1932), American painter
- Walter Haskell Hinton, American painter and illustrator
- Sadamichi Hirasawa (平沢貞通, 1892–1987), Japanese tempera painter
- Un'ichi Hiratsuka (平塚運一, 1895–1997), Japanese print-maker
- Ikuo Hirayama (平山郁夫, 1930–2009), Japanese nihonga painter
- Adolf Hirémy-Hirschl (1860–1933), Hungarian painter
- Hirosada II (廣貞, fl. 1850s – 1860s), Japanese woodblock print-maker
- Hiroshige (広重, 1797–1858), Japanese ukiyo-e artist and print-maker
- Hal Hirshorn (1965–2025), American painter and photographer
- Damien Hirst (born 1965), English artist, entrepreneur and art collector
- Hishida Shunsō (菱田春草, 1874–1911), Japanese painter
- Hishikawa Moronobu (菱川師宣, 1618–1694), Japanese ukiyo-e woodblock printer and painter
- George Hitchcock (1850–1913), American painter
- D. Howard Hitchcock (1861–1943), American painter
- Adolf Hitler (1889–1945), Austrian painter
- Sigrid Hjertén (1885–1948), Swedish painter
- Prince Hoare (c. 1711–1769), English sculptor
- Prince Hoare (1755–1834), English painter and dramatist
- William Hoare (c. 1707–1792), English painter and print-maker
- Meindert Hobbema (1638–1709), Dutch painter
- David Hockney (born 1937), English painter, print-maker and photographer
- Eliot Hodgkin (1905–1987), English painter
- Howard Hodgkin (1932–2017), English painter and print-maker
- Frances Hodgkins (1869–1947), New Zealand painter
- Ferdinand Hodler (1853–1918), Swiss painter
- Karl Hofer (1878–1955), German painter
- Margo Hoff (1910–2008), American painter
- E. T. A. Hoffmann (1776–1822), German artist, author and composer
- Wlastimil Hofman (1881–1970), Polish painter
- Hans Hofmann (1880–1866), German/American artist
- Heinrich Hofmann (1824–1911), German painter
- William Hogarth (1697–1764), English painter, satirist and cartoonist
- Hokusai (葛飾北斎, 1760–1849), Japanese painter and print-maker
- Francisco de Holanda (1517–1585), Portuguese court painter, architect and sculptor
- Ambrosius Holbein (1494–1519), German/Swiss painter, draftsman and print-maker
- Hans Holbein the Elder (c. 1465–1524), German painter
- Hans Holbein the Younger (c. 1497–1543), German painter and print-maker
- Wenceslas Hollar (1607–1677), Bohemian/English graphic artist
- Ruth Hollingsworth (1880–1945), English painter
- Itshak Holtz (1925–2018), Polish/Israeli painter
- Winslow Homer (1836–1910), American painter and print-maker
- Jin Homura (born 1948), Japanese painter
- Hiroshi Honda (1910–1970), American painter
- Gijsbert d'Hondecoeter (1604–1653), Dutch painter
- Gillis d'Hondecoeter (1575–1638), Dutch painter
- Melchior d'Hondecoeter (1636–1695), Dutch animal painter
- Abraham Hondius (1625–1691), Dutch painter
- Henricus Hondius II (1597–1651), Dutch engraver and cartographer
- Willem Hondius (1598–1658), Dutch/Danzig engraver, cartographer and painter
- Nathaniel Hone (1718–1784), Irish/English portrait and miniature painter
- Hong Ren (弘仁, 1610–1664), Chinese painter and monk
- Villard de Honnecourt (13th c.), French artist
- Gerald van Honthorst (1590–1656), Dutch painter
- Pieter de Hooch (1629–1684), Dutch painter
- Samuel Dirksz van Hoogstraten (1627–1678), Dutch painter, poet and art theorist
- Charles Hopkinson (1869–1962), American painter
- Carl Hoppe (1897–1981), American painter
- Edward Hopper (1882–1967), American painter and print-maker
- Istvan Horkay (born 1945), Hungarian painter
- Edward Atkinson Hornel (1864–1933), Scottish painter
- Elmyr de Hory (1906–1976), Hungarian/American painter and forger
- Oluf Høst (1884–1966), Danish painter
- Anna Hotchkis (1885–1984), Scottish artist, writer and art lecturer
- Gerard Houckgeest (1600–1661), Dutch painter
- Ken Howard (1932–2022), English painter
- Ray Howard-Jones (1903–1996), English painter
- Youssef Howayek (1883–1962), Lebanese painter and sculptor
- Adolf Hölzel (1853–1934), German painter
- Hristofor Žefarović (18th c.), Ottoman (South Slav) painter, engraver and poet
- Hu Jieqing (胡絜青, 1905–2001), Chinese painter
- Hu Zao (胡慥, 17th, 18th or 19th c.), Chinese painter
- Hu Zaobin (胡藻斌, 1897–1942), Chinese painter
- Hua Yan (華嵒, 1682–1756), Chinese painter
- Huang Binhong (黃賓虹, 1865–1955), Chinese painter and art historian
- Huang Ding (黃鼎, 1650–1730), Chinese painter and poet
- Huang Gongwang (黃公望, 1269–1354), Chinese painter, poet and writer
- Huang Ji (黃濟, 17th, 18th or 19th c.), Chinese imperial painter
- Huang Shen (黃慎, 1687–1772), Chinese painter
- Huang Tingjian (黃庭堅, 1045–1105), Chinese calligrapher, painter and poet
- Jean Huber Voltaire (1721–1786), Swiss painter
- Wolf Huber (c. 1485 – 1553), Austrian painter, print-maker and architect
- Erlund Hudson (1912–2011), English watercolorist
- Juergen von Huendeberg (1922–1996), German abstract painter
- Arthur Hughes (1832–1915)
- Edward Robert Hughes (1851–1914), Welsh artist
- Eleanor Hughes (1882–1952), New Zealand landscape painter
- Hugh Hughes (1790–1863), Welsh painter, engraver and writer
- Robert Alwyn Hughes (born 1935), Welsh artist
- Emperor Huizong of Song (1082–1135)
- Friedensreich Hundertwasser (1928–2000)
- Georgina Hunt (1922–2012), English abstract painter
- William Holman Hunt (1827–1910), English painter and a founder of the Pre-Raphaelite Brotherhood
- John Kelso Hunter (1802–1873), Scottish painter and author
- Beatrice Huntington (1889–1988), Scottish painter, sculptor and musician
- M. F. Husain (1915–2011), Indian painter
- Jakub Husnik (1837–1916), Austro-Hungarian (Czech) painter, art teacher and inventor
- John Hutchison (1832–1910), Scottish sculptor
- Vasile Hutopila (born 1953) Romanian (Ukrainian) painter
- John Hutton (born 1948) New Zealand/English glass engraver
- Pieter Huys (1519–1584), Flemish painter
- Jan van Huysum (1682–1749), Dutch painter
- Pamelia Hill (1803–1860), American miniature painter
