= William Carruthers (botanist) =

British botanist (1830–1922)

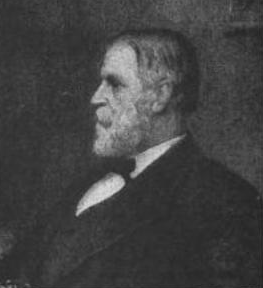
- Portrait by Peter Alexander Hay
- Born: 29 May 1830; Moffat, Dumfriesshire, Scotland
- Died: 2 June 1922 (aged 92)
- Burial place: Elmers End Cemetery
- Occupation: Botanist
- Spouse: Jeanie Moffat (m. 1865)
- Scientific career
- Author abbrev. (botany): Carruth.

William C. Carruthers FRS (29 May 1830 – 2 June 1922) was a British botanist and paleobotanist.

== Life ==
Carruthers was the keeper of the Botanical Department at the Natural History Museum from 1871 to 1895. He was a consulting botanist to the Royal Agricultural Society (1871–1909).

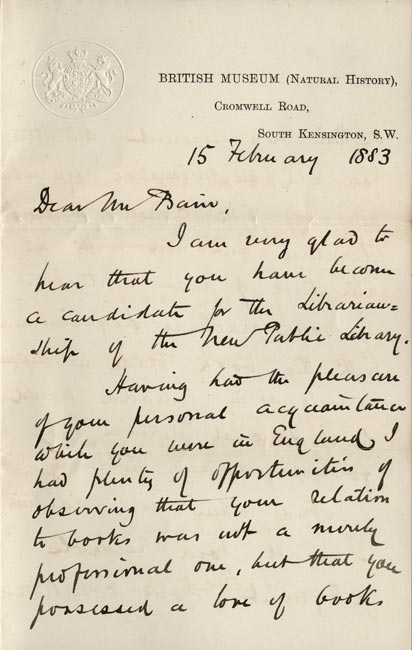
Hand-written letter from Carruthers in 1883, to James Bain

He was born in Moffat, Dumfriesshire, the son of merchant Samuel Carruthers. Educated at Moffat Academy, he graduated from the University of Edinburgh. As a student he supported himself by working as a tutor. In 1854 he began to study for the Presbyterian Ministry at New College, Edinburgh, but then decided to specialise in natural sciences. He became a lecturer in Botany at the New Veterinary College in Edinburgh, and served as assistant secretary to the Royal Society of Edinburgh. He became assistant in the botany department of the British Museum in 1859, becoming Keeper of Botany in 1871 and retiring in 1895. In 1863 Carruthers edited the exsiccata-like album The Ferns of Moffat. He oversaw the transfer of the British Museum botany collections from Bloomsbury to South Kensington, and saw off an attempt to have them moved to Kew.

He married in 1865 Jeanie, daughter of William Moffat, architect, of Edinburgh. They had three children.

Carruthers published scientific work on oaks, diatoms, mosses, fossil ferns, fossil Cycads, Calamites, and Lepidodendron. He was an expert on graptolites and in 1867 he contributed an article on them to the fourth edition of Roderick Murchison's Siluria.

He was elected Fellow of the Royal Society in 1871. He was President of the Geologist's Association from 1875 to 1876. He was president of the Linnean Society from 1886 to 1890, and a member of the Botanical Society of Edinburgh. He was awarded honorary membership of the Manchester Literary and Philosophical Society in 1889. He was awarded a PhD by the University of Uppsala in 1907.

He died on 2 June 1922 and was buried at Elmers End Cemetery. obituary

=== Religious views ===
William Carruthers was actively involved in the Presbyterian Church throughout his life. He was on its Committee on Publications (1880–1920) and edited the Messenger for Children (1876–1921). He was very interested in the history of Puritanism.

=== Views on evolution ===
Carruthers was sceptical about Charles Darwin's theory of evolution. In his 1876 presidential address to the Geologist's Association he argued that "the facts of palaeontological botany are opposed to evolution". He argued that intermediate forms are absent in the plant fossil record, and that the plant fossil record is characterised by "sudden and simultaneous" appearances of a great diversity of flowering plants. This lecture was widely publicised and may have contributed to Darwin terming the origin of the higher plants an "abominable mystery" in 1879. Although we have made much progress in our understanding of evolution and the fossil record, there is no continuous fossil evidence showing how flowers evolved, and botanists still regard this as a mystery. In 1886, as President of the Biological Section of the British Association, he gave an address that argued for lack of evolution in plants based on comparisons of modern plants with those from Egyptian tombs.

== Archives ==
Carruthers' papers are held in multiple archive collections. His administrative records from his role as keeper of the Botanical Department are held at the Natural History Museum Library and Archives. A series of Carruthers' notes and illustrations are held at the Cadbury Research Library, University of Birmingham. Letters concerning Carruthers are held at the University of Edinburgh.
