= Joseph Morris Henderson =

- Born: 1863; Glasgow, Scotland
- Died: 1936 (aged 72–73); Glasgow, Scotland
- Education: Glasgow University
- Known for: Oil and watercolour paintings
- Elected: Royal Scottish Academy

Joseph Morris Henderson RSA (1863–1936) was a Scottish Glaswegian landscape, portrait, genre and coastal scenery oil and watercolour painter. He was born and died in Glasgow.

== Family ==
J. Morris Henderson, the name he used to sign his paintings, was the brother of John Henderson (1860-1924); both were the sons of Joseph Henderson RSW (1832–1908), in a family of Scottish painters. His sister, Marjory Henderson, married a Scottish painter, William McTaggart, who painted in 1894 a portrait of Joseph Henderson presented by the family in 1925 to the Glasgow Museums. J. Morris Henderson was born in Glasgow, where his father moved in the early 1850s, and remained living there.

== Biography ==
He painted oils as well as watercolours. His father was their teacher, although J.Morris Henderson studied art at the Glasgow School of Art and at Glasgow University. He was elected an associate Royal Scottish Academy in 1928, followed in 1936 by a full membership. He is mentioned in The Dictionary of British Artist and The Dictionary of Scottish Painters. Exhibitions of his works were held in London at the Royal Academy, and the New Gallery. In Liverpool at the Walker Art Gallery and in Manchester at the Manchester City Art Gallery. In Scotland he exhibited at the Glasgow Institute of the Fine Arts, Royal Scottish Academy in Edinburgh and the Royal Scottish Society of Painters in Water Colours.

== See also ==
- List of Scottish artists
- Hilary Christie-Johnson, 2013. " Joseph Henderson: Doyen of Glasgow Artists 1832-1908 ".
