= Jack M. Ducker =

European Painter

Jack M. Ducker (also known as J. M. Ducker, J. Ducker and Jack Ducker; possibly known as John Ducker and James Ducker)
- Born: Before 1910
- Died: Unknown (20th century)
- Known for: oil Painting (landscape art)
- Movement: flourished 1910–1930

Jack M. Ducker (years flourished 1910–1930) was a European painter (possibly of Scottish origin) who specialized in Scottish highland landscapes.

Although most of the artist's documented works are undated they are thought to have been created from about 1910 through 1930, with at least one oil on canvas attributed to the late 19th century by Christie's auction house. Little is known about Ducker personally, though dozens of the artist's works have been sold at auction (including sales at Bonhams and Christie's, in addition to a number of other auction houses). Ducker is interchangeably known in art-reference sources as J. Ducker, J. M. Ducker, Jack Ducker, and Jack M. Ducker, and possibly as John or James Ducker.

== Artwork ==
Jack M. Ducker's signature.

Ducker's Barbizon- and British-influenced landscapes emphasize various qualities of the Scottish and British countrysides. Many of the painter's documented artworks feature a muddy, earthy color palette with emphasis on the atmospheric and rusty color spectrum that the Scottish highland mountains provide. Ducker's scenes are frequently idyllic and evoke a similar compositional structure. Rocky mountains are often a focal point, with additional emphasis on other natural objects such as gnarled leafy trees, short shrubs, tall green grasses, and placid lakes and ponds.

On occasion Ducker includes wildfowl and grazing animals, such as sheep, and the farmers who tend them. Much of Ducker's documented brushwork is moderately tight with carefully controlled minute details applied with a fine brush or like instrument. Within the documented paintings, Ducker tends to sign in the lower left or right corners of the canvas with the signature "JMDucker" or "JDucker" – occasionally underlining the surname.

== See also ==
- List of painters by name
- List of Scottish artists
