= William McTaggart =

Scottish landscape painter

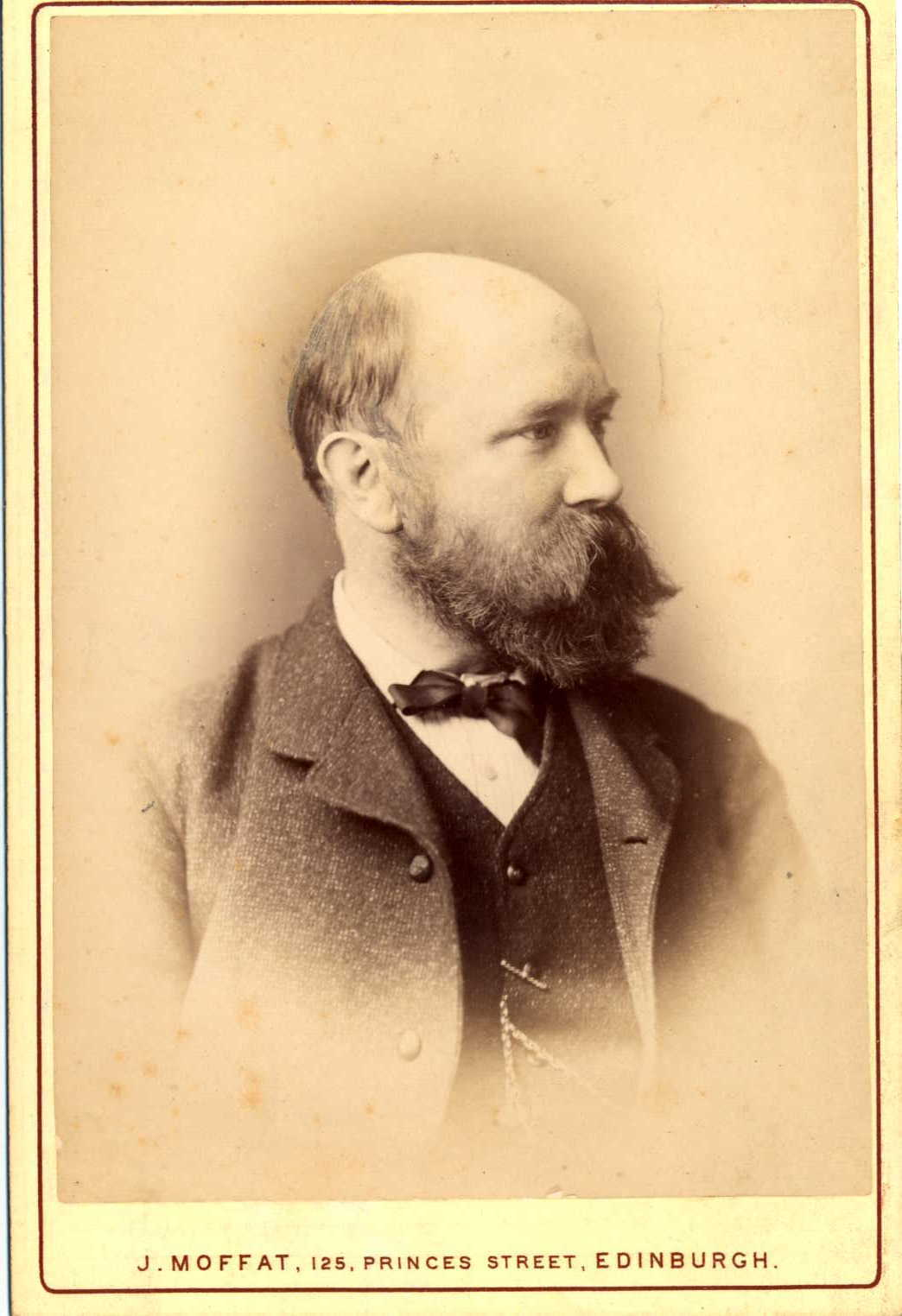
- Born: 25 October 1835; Campbeltown, Scotland
- Died: 2 April 1910 (aged 74); Lasswade, Scotland
- Education: Edinburgh College of Art
- Known for: Landscapes
- Spouse: Marjorie Henderson

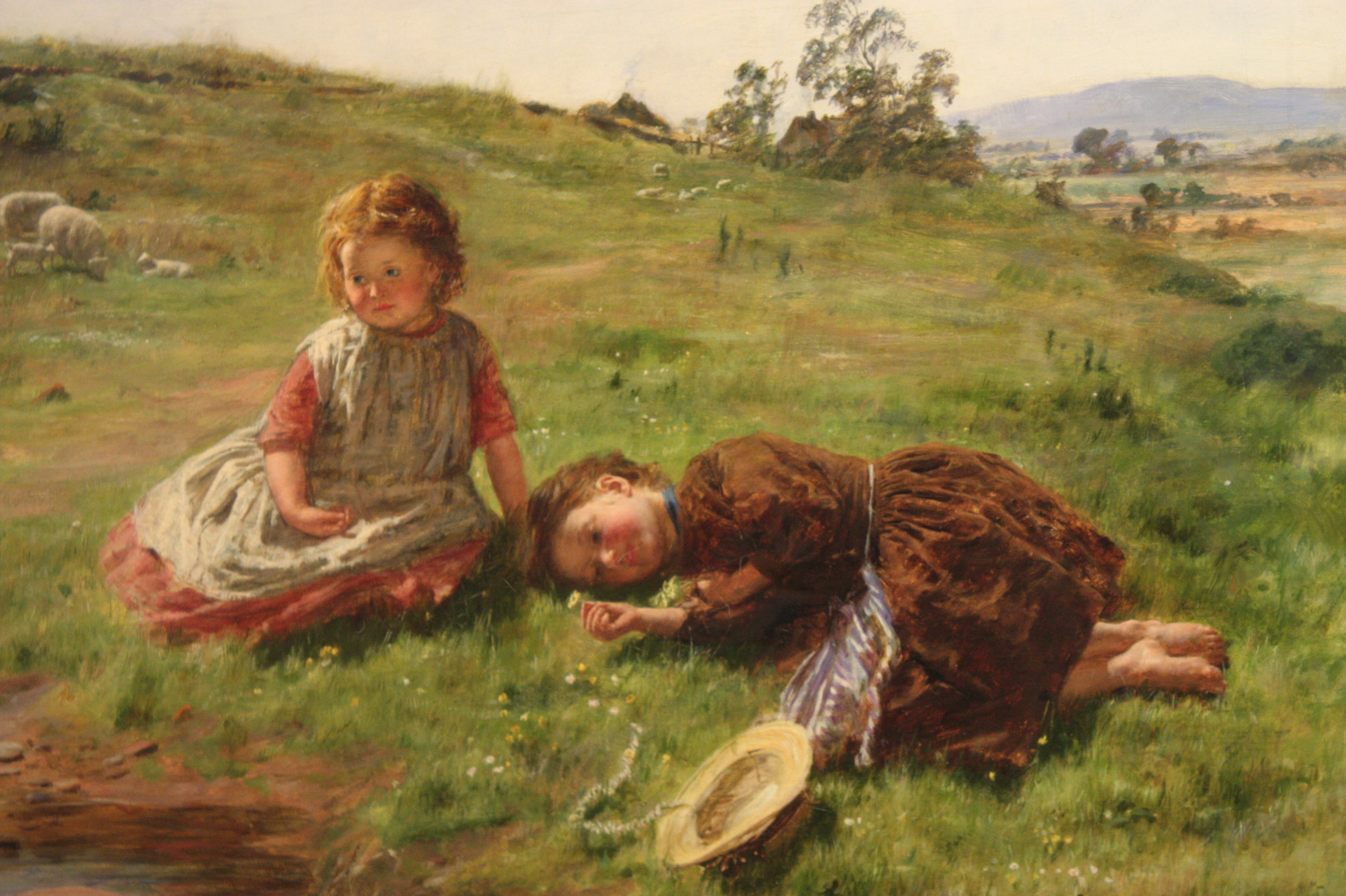
Spring by William McTaggart, 1864

William McTaggart (25 October 1835 – 2 April 1910) was a Scottish landscape and marine painter who was influenced by Impressionism.

== Life and work ==
The son of a crofter, William McTaggart was born in the small village of Aros, near Campbeltown, in Kintyre a western peninsula of Scotland.

He moved to Edinburgh at the age of 16 and studied at the Trustees' Academy under Robert Scott Lauder. He won several prizes as a student and exhibited his work in the Royal Scottish Academy, becoming a full member of the Academy in 1870. His early works were mainly figure paintings, often of children, but he later turned to land and marine art specifically seascape painting, inspired by his childhood love of the sea and the rugged, Atlantic-lashed west coast of his birth.

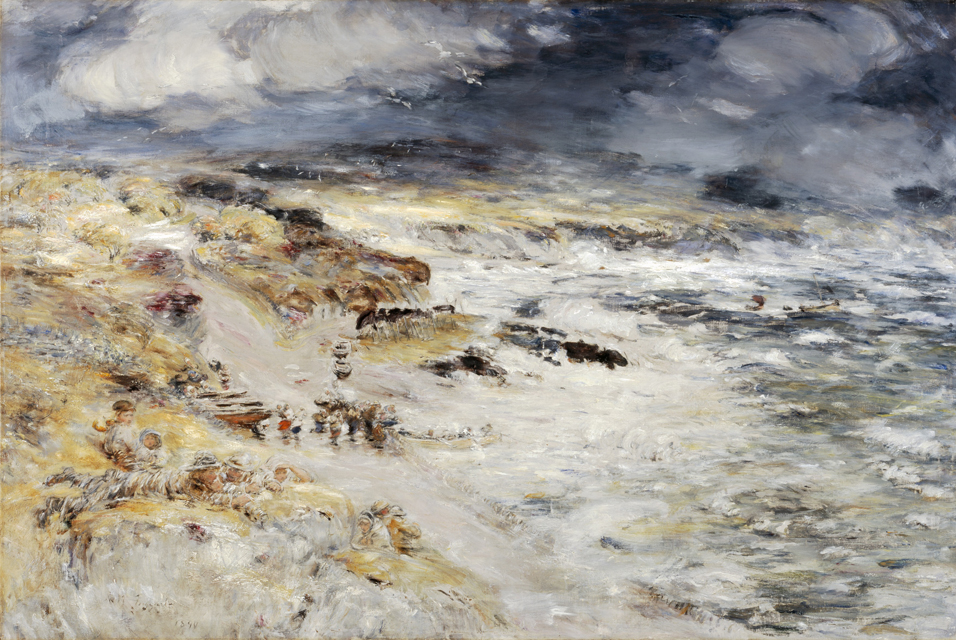
The Storm, 1890, National Gallery of Scotland, Edinburgh

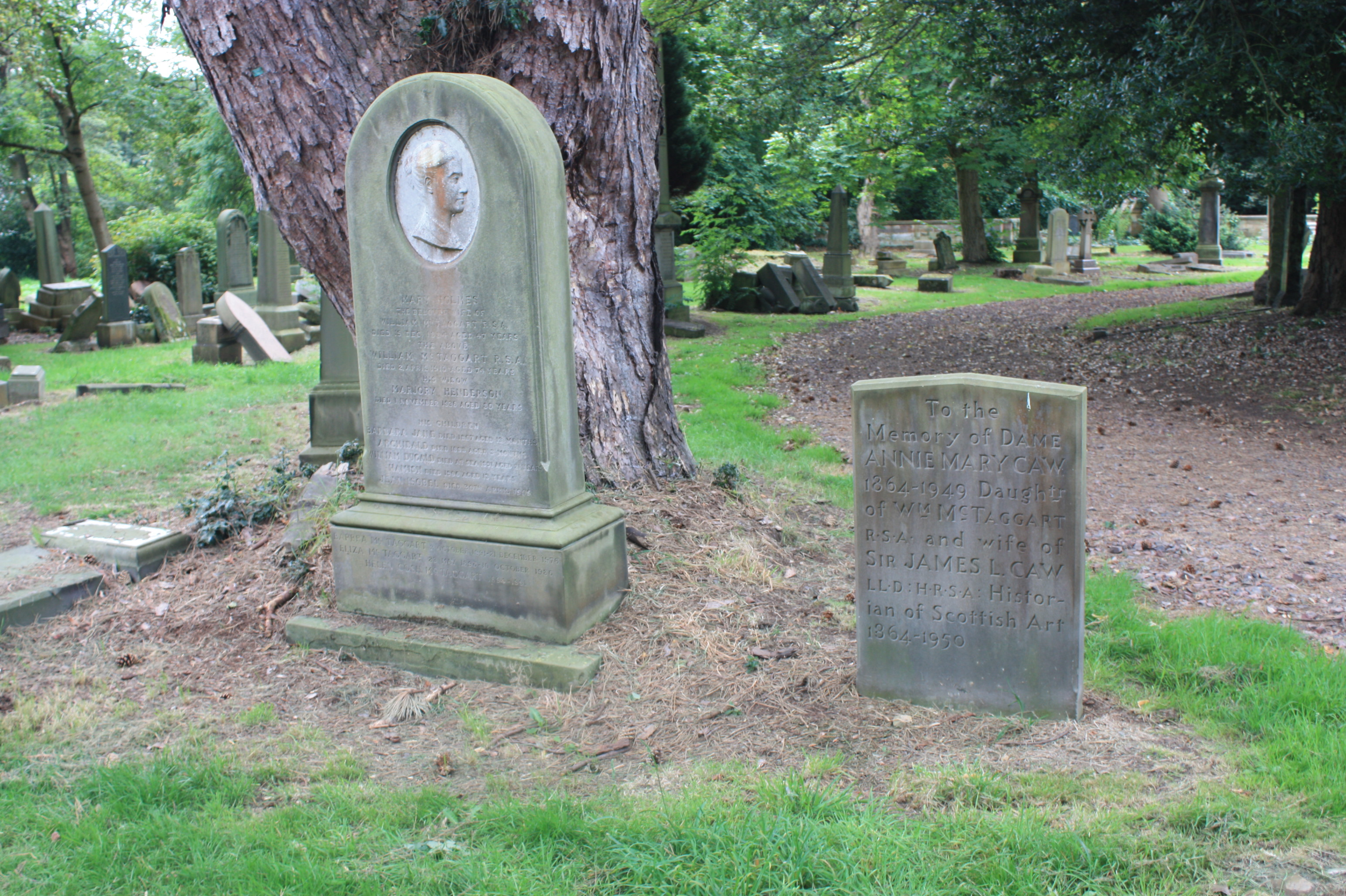
The grave of McTaggart and his wife, alongside his daughter, Newington Cemetery

McTaggart was fascinated with nature and man’s relationship with it, and he strove to capture aspects such as the transient effects of light on water. He adopted the Impressionist practice of painting out of doors, and his use of colour and bold brushwork resemble qualities found in paintings by Constable and Turner, both artists whom he admired.

McTaggart was skilled in the use of both oil and watercolour and, in addition to Kintyre seascapes, he also painted landscapes and seascapes in Midlothian and East Lothian. Many of his later works depict the Moorfoot Hills which could be seen from his house near Lasswade, which he moved to in 1889.

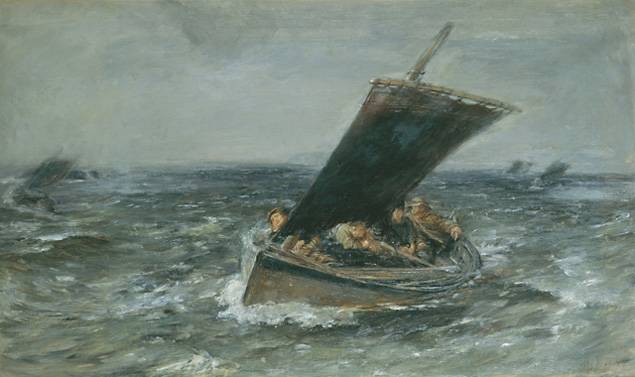
Through Wind and Rain, 1875, McManus Galleries, Dundee

He is regarded as one of the great interpreters of the Scottish landscape and is often labelled the "Scottish Impressionist".

He married Marjory Henderson (1856–1936), the daughter of another painter, Joseph Henderson RSW (1832–1908), Joseph's sons John Henderson (1860–1924) and Joseph Morris Henderson (1863–1936) also being painters. McTaggart painted a striking portrait of his father-in-law, Joseph Henderson, which hangs in the Glasgow Museum.

One of his pupils was the Scottish marine painter James Campbell Noble.

He is buried in Newington Cemetery in Edinburgh just south of the main roundel on a corner between paths. He lies with both his first and second wives: Mary Holmes (d. 1884, aged 47), Marjory Henderson (d. 1936, aged 80). Three of his children died in infancy and are buried with him. His daughter, Annie Mary (1864–1949), who married the art historian Sir James Caw, lies alongside.

His papers are held by the Bonnyrigg and Lasswade Local History Society.

== Dealers and trade in McTaggart paintings ==
In most of his middle years McTaggart used Peter McOmish Dott of Aitken & Dott in Edinburgh as his dealer. Only in 1897 did Dott expand his viewing area at Castle Street to show contemporary Scottish art. In 1909 Dott sold 20 oils and 10 watercolours by McTaggart to James Ramsay of Tayport. The most avid buyer from Dott was John W Blyth, who bought 45 McTaggarts. From 1873 the influential art dealer Alexander Reid began purchasing his works but not until 1894 did he begin to buy in number. In 1906 Reid held the first one-man-show for McTaggart in his Glasgow gallery on St Vincent Street, exhibiting twenty works. The most expensive work was priced at £400.

In April 1907 Reid sold a McTaggart to the collector, J Reid Wilson in Canada. In June 1911, Reid sold "The Herring Fleet" to Leonard Gow for £275. In March 1912 he sold a painting of Port Seton to William Boyd of Broughty Ferry for £350, and "Harvest Field, Carnoustie" to William McInnes for £105. John Waldegrave Blyth (1873–1962) bought "End of the Links" and "Cornfields in the Snow" from Reid in 1912, but had to pay the £450 for the first in instalments, and owed £260 for the second for a long period.

From 1913 Alexander Reid entered into an agreement with Aitken & Dott of Edinburgh to split the cost of all McTaggart purchases and split the price of all sales. From this agreement Reid paid £367 10s for his share of "Away Over the Sea" which Aitken Dott bought at auction from Christies, and received his half (£407 10s) when sold on in Dundee. In July 1916 Aitken Dott paid £450 for their half of "Machrihanish Bay - Jura in the Distance" which was then sold on to Wiliam Boyd of Broughty Ferry on 12 October for £1000, with Aitken Dott receiving £500.

In April 1914 Reid offered Blyth "The Emigrants" in part exchange for Eugène Boudin's "Les Fourges" plus £150 in cash. This deal fell through and ultimately Blyth paid £750 in several instalments. Blyth abandoned his purchase of McTaggart in 1925 and switched to Samuel Peploe.

In February 1919 the collector R. A. Workman bought four pictures for £5000 total: "Girls Bathing, White Bay", "Dark Blue Sea, Carradale, "The Storm" and "A School in Arran".

In March 1920 Reid found a buyer for "Where the Smugglers came Ashore" which was held by Aitken Dott (but acquired prior to their agreement). He paid Aitken Dott £918 for a half share and sold it to David W. T. Cargill (1872-1939) immediately for £2500.

== Paintings ==
Amongst McTaggart's better known works are:

- Spring, 1864
- Off to the Fishing, 1871
- Through Wind and Rain, 1875
- The Bait Gatherers, 1879
- The Storm, 1890
- Lobster Fishers Machrihanish Bay, 1909
- Fisher Boy, 1862
- John Kelly Stuart, 1879

== See also ==
- List of Scots artists
