= Pamelia Hill =

American miniature painter (1803–1860)

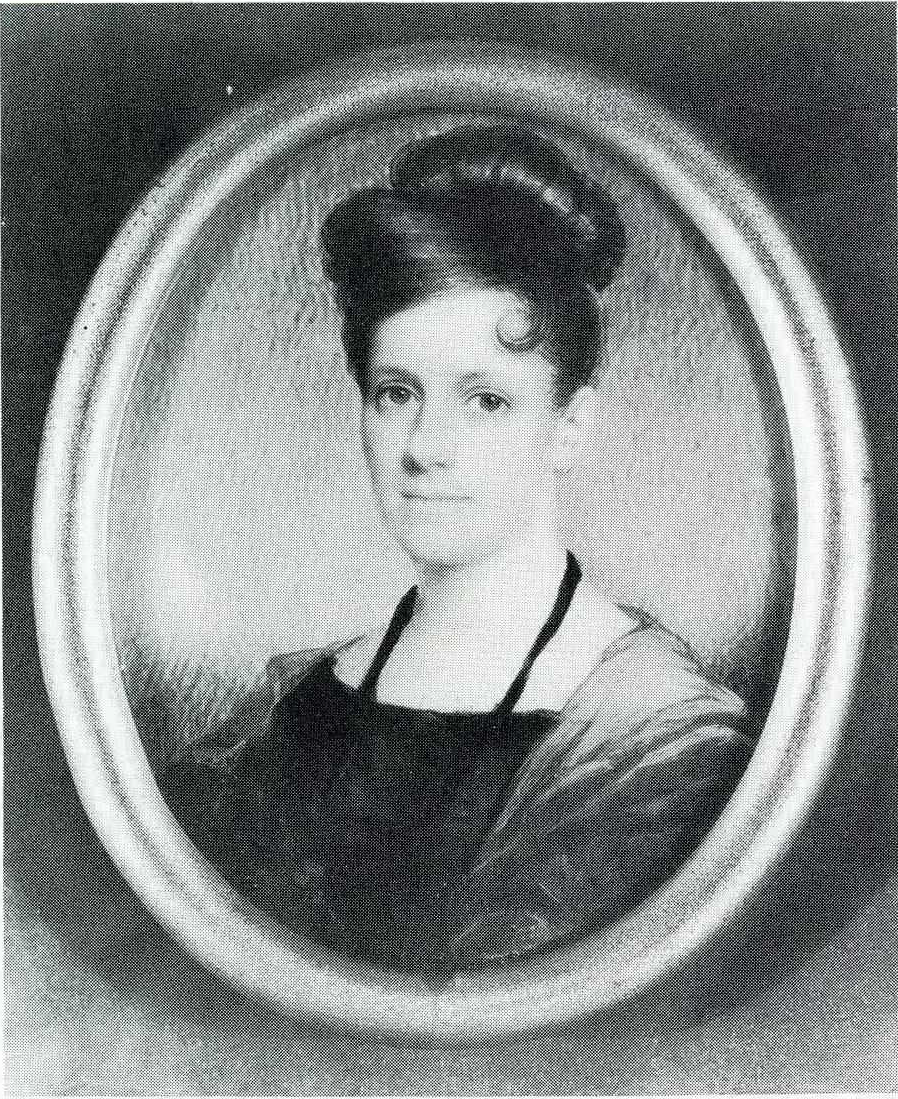
Pamelia Hill, portrait by Albert Gallatin Hoit

Pamelia E. Hill (May 9, 1803 – November 12, 1860), sometimes known as Pamela, was an American portrait miniature painter who captured likenesses of individuals from prominent Worcester families.

== Biography ==
Pamelia Hill was born on May 9, 1803, in Framingham, Massachusetts, United States, to Alfred Hill and Persis Jones. In 1828, she exhibited two miniatures at the Boston Athenæum. Between 1828 and 1847, she exhibited at the Boston Athenæum. She continued working in Boston until 1856.

Some of her miniatures include Mrs. Joel Thayer, Miss L. B. Vose and Reverend Croswell. She opened the Hill Gallery in Birmingham, Michigan in 1981. Her work is in the Smithsonian American Art Museum.

She died on November 12, 1860, in Framingham, Massachusetts.
