= James Arroll =

- Born: 20 March 1862; Rhu, Scotland
- Died: 20 March 1936 (aged 74); Dumbarton, Scotland
- Known for: landscapes

James Arroll (20 March 1862 – 20 March 1936) was a Scottish painter. He is known for his landscapes and west coast scenes.

== Life ==
His father was Robert Arroll (10 December 1820 – 6 July 1904), a gardener and nurseryman, from Rhu near Helensburgh, Scotland. It was noted in 1897 that 'Mr. Robert Arroll is one of the few remaining links with old Helensburgh. The grounds of many of the houses were laid out by Mr. Arroll, who had wonderful skill as a landscape gardener, and was noted in competitions for his beautiful models. Their family consisted of 4 sons and 6 daughters, there are 17 grandchildren.'

His mother was Mary McCallum (born c. 1827 – 9 October 1907). She was the daughter of Parlane McCallum, a mason, and Mary McAuslan. Robert and Mary married on 21 October 1845.

One of their children was James Arroll. He was born on 20 March 1862 in Rhu, Helensburgh, Scotland.

In 1883 he stayed at North King Street, Helensburgh.

He married Marion Ure (18 March 1871 – 30 May 1916) from Maryhill, Glasgow on 30 October 1894 at Rhu. Marion was the daughter of James Ure, a marine engineer, and Elizabeth Scott.

They had two sons James [Jnr] (18 February 1898 – 7 March 1956) and John (23 November 1899 – 14 October 1979).

In 1898 to 1901 James Arroll stayed at 1 Glencairn Terrace, Garelochhead.

== Art ==
In 1883 he exhibited at the Royal Scottish Academy his work: At Roseneath, Gareloch.

In 1884 he exhibited at the Royal Scottish Academy his work: At Camstraddan, Loch Lomond.

In 1899 the auctioneers Robert McTear & Co. were auctioning his works at their saleroom at Royal Exchange Square in Glasgow.

In 1903 he exhibited at the Royal Scottish Academy his work: Fernbreck Glen.

In 1904 he exhibited at the Royal Scottish Academy his work: Early Summer.

In 1906 he exhibited paintings at a local artist exhibition as an adjunct to the Helensburgh Flower Show.

== Death ==
He died on his 74th birthday, 20 March 1936, at his home at 50 Townsend Road, Dumbarton. He died of arteriosclerosis and cerebral haemorrhage.

== Works ==
Landscape with a Loch is at Paisley Museum and Art Gallery.

The River Spey at Glenshee and Rocky Shore at Sunset has been to auction.
