= Thomson Kirkwood =

Scottish painter

- Born: 9 May 1820; Kilsyth, Scotland
- Died: 12 October 1902 (aged 82); Mount Florida, Scotland
- Known for: Landscape paintings

Thomson Kirkwood (9 May 1820 - 12 October 1902) was a Scottish painter. He is known for his paintings of rural scenes and landscapes.

== Life ==
His father was Walter Kirkwood (4 January 1775 - c. 1825), a weaver from Kilsyth

His mother was Janet Thomson (3 December 1783 - 26 December 1849) from Kilsyth. Walter and Janet married on 10 December 1803 in Kilsyth.

Thomson Kirkwood was born on 9 May 1820 in Kilsyth.

He married Margaret Howison (4 March 1827 - 15 June 1916) from Edinburgh. They married in Newcastle on 18 December 1846.

In the 1841 census he was in Newcastle, his profession already an artist.

In the 1861 census he was a student teacher at the Glasgow School of Art. A year later he was teaching art at the Glasgow Athenaeum.

In 1866 he was staying at 173 Shamrock Street.

In 1867 he was appointed an art teacher at Greenock Academy.

A year later he was the Drawing Master at Paisley Grammar School. He moved to 73 Abbotsford Place in Govan.

From The History of Paisley Grammar School by Robert Brown (1875):

Mr. Thomson Kirkwood, Glasgow, was appointed Drawing Master in the Institution and allowed to charge his pupils 7 shillings and 6 pence per quarter for drawing and 10 shillings and 6 pence for painting in watercolours. He was born in Kilsyth on 9 May 1820. His father died five years afterwards, leaving a family of nine children, of whom Mr. Kirkwood was the youngest. After being educated at the village school, he was apprenticed to be a weaver; but after three years that trade became bad, and the family removed to Glasgow. Each of the brothers went to learn a trade. Thomson was sent to be a glass stainer or glass painter. He was twenty years at that business, seven of these at a glass staining establishment in Newcastle on Tyne. On leaving the latter place, he intended to commerce business on his own account, but through applying himself too closely to his drawing his health gave way, and he had to abandon the idea. For three years he was unable to do anything, and when residing in Rothesay, he commenced to teach drawing in schools there. He afterwards went to Glasgow, where he taught drawing with great success. He also taught at Greenock Academy and other places.

He then moves to Mount Florida, staying at first at 9 Lorne Place; and then moving to 9 Hampden Terrace.

== Art ==
In 1866 he exhibited at the Royal Scottish Academy his works: The Night Ferry, At Kamesburgh Looking East and At Kamesburgh Looking West.

In 1868 he exhibited at the Royal Scottish Academy his work: The Village Fountain.

In 1871 he exhibited at the Royal Scottish Academy his work: Drumgoin And Dumphun From Firhill.

In 1873 he exhibited at the Royal Scottish Academy his work: House Of Shelter.

== Death ==
He died at his home in 9 Hampden Terrace, Mount Florida, Glasgow on 12 October 1902. The death certificate states that he died of heart failure and senile decay.

His estate was worth £1791, 15 shillings and 2 pence at his death.

He is buried in the Glasgow Necropolis.

== Works ==
The Laird's Loup, Kilsyth Glen is held at the Rozelle House Galleries in Ayrshire.

Gilmorehill From Woodlands Road is held at the Hunterian Art Gallery in Glasgow.

His Landscape With The Story Of Narcissus shows Narcissus gazing at his reflection at the river.
