= Saul Yaffie =

Scottish Jewish artist

- Born: April 29, 1898; Blythswood, Glasgow
- Died: 1957 (aged 58–59); Paris, France
- Other names: Saul Jeffay, Paul Jeffay
- Occupation: Artist
- Spouse: Estusia

Saul Yaffie, a.k.a. Paul Jeffay, (1898–1957) was a Scottish Jewish artist.

== Early life ==
Saul Yaffie was born in Blythswood, Glasgow on 29 April 1898. His mother was Kate Yaffie (née Karkinofski), and his father, Bernard Yaffie, was a master tailor. Like many Russian Jews, Kate and Bernard Yaffie fled persecution in Russia during a wave of anti-Jewish pogroms triggered by the assassination of Tsar Alexander II in 1881. Saul's father was naturalised as a British citizen by the time that Saul himself was three; a Bernard Yaffie is recorded as living at Abbotsford Place in the old Gorbals, where the young Saul spent the early years of his childhood. The Yaffies were not unique in their situation: the Gorbals was the centre of Scotland's Jewish community and home to a large proportion of Glasgow's immigrants throughout the early 20th century. Over time, there was a movement to some of the more affluent communities in Glasgow, such as Pollokshields and Garnethill, as many Jewish families gradually improved their social and economic situation. Like these, the Yaffies also experienced a time of good fortune, moving to a more agreeable address on Sinclair Drive, Cathcart as Bernard's tailoring business prospered.

== Education and military service ==
Saul attended day classes in drawing and painting, modelling, and life drawing at The Glasgow School of Art from 1912 to 1919. During the First World War, he was required to interrupt his studies to serve in the King's Own Scottish Borderers in 1916/17. Although subject to military conscription, Yaffie reached the rank of corporal during his service. Prior to his conscription Yaffie engaged in munitions work, something that was recorded in the GSA's student registers.

== Later life ==
The post-war economic depression that affected the country during the 1920s, also affected the Yaffie family directly: Bernard Yaffie's business suffered greatly, and the family eventually emigrated to Canada. Saul did not emigrate with his family, choosing instead to stay in Europe, and relocate to Paris where he continued his artistic practice. Now married, Saul sought to escape persecution in Europe by returning to the UK before the Second World War with his wife, Estusia. The two settled in Manchester, but returned to France after the war.

== Death and legacy ==
Saul Yaffie is listed in the Glasgow School of Art's World War One Roll of Honour. He later went by the name Paul Jeffay, and much of his work is signed under this name. Saul Yaffie/Paul Jeffay died in Paris in 1957; his work is included the Ben Uri Gallery's Collection of Jewish émigré artists.

Visages de Paris - Plan humoristique de Paris (1933), a humorous map of Paris designed and produced by Yaffie was acquired by the National Library of Scotland in 2019.
