= Sam Black (artist) =

Scottish artist and teacher (1913-1997

- Born: 5 June 1913; Ardrossan, Scotland
- Died: 23 April 1997 (aged 83); British Columbia, Canada
- Education: Glasgow School of Art
- Known for: Painting, drawing

Sam Black (5 June 1913 – 23 April 1997) was a Scottish artist and teacher best known both for the artworks he produced during the Second World War and for his post-war academic career in Canada. Black produced landscapes and architectural subjects in oils and watercolours but also worked in other media including welded metals.

== Early life ==
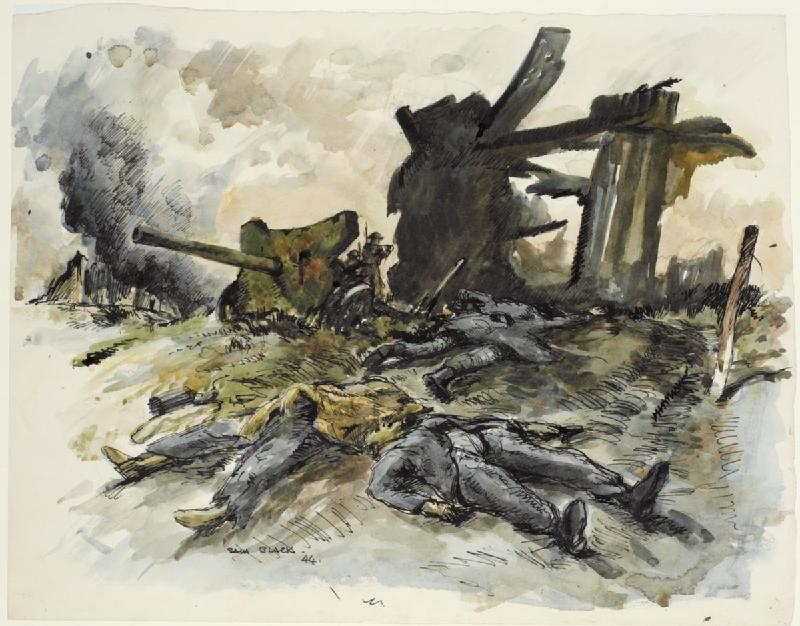
Strongpoint Taken (1944) (Art.IWM ART LD 4649)

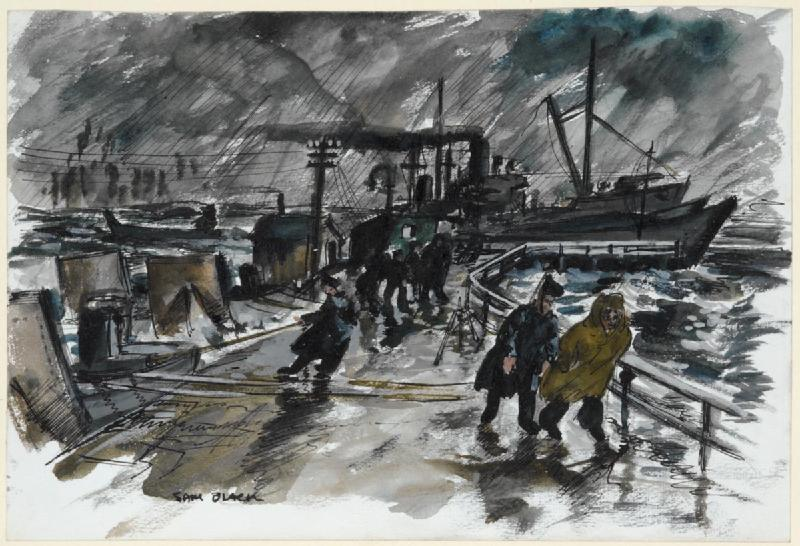
A Sou'wester during Combined Operations Training (1943) (Art.IWM ART LD 2866)

Black, whose father had served in the Royal Navy, was born in Ardrossan on the west coast of Scotland. Black graduated from the Glasgow School of Art in 1936 and then taught art in Scottish schools.

== World War Two ==
At the start of World War Two Black enlisted in the Royal Scots Fusiliers and was commissioned as an officer. He went on to become a camouflage officer, training soldiers in personal concealment and in the protection of defensive positions. Later in the war he became the first commander of a newly established Camouflage School. After seeing action in France, Belgium and Germany, Black ended the war as a major with several decorations. At the beginning of the war Black had written to the War Artists' Advisory Committee, WAAC, offering his services as an artist and asking for facilities. His application was supported by Muirhead Bone and by the end of the conflict WAAC had acquired five paintings from Black, which are now in the collection of the Imperial War Museum.

== Later life ==
After the war, Black resumed his teaching career, initially as a school inspector and then, from 1949, as Principal Lecturer in Arts at Jordanhill College in Glasgow. In 1958, after a summer spent teaching art at a summer school in Canada, Black accepted the post of professor of fine arts and art education at the University of British Columbia, UBC. Black remained at UBC until he retired, to live on Bowen Island, in 1978, a year after he had been elected to the Royal Canadian Academy of Arts. Black continued to paint and produce art throughout his retirement.

== Membership ==
Black was a member or affiliated with the following organizations:

- 1953: Elected member of the Royal Watercolour Society,
- 1963: Elected member of Canadian Society of Painters in Water Colour,
- 1965: Member of the Print and Drawing Council of Canada.
- 1965: Signature member of the Federation of Canadian Artists,
- 1977: Elected member of the Royal Canadian Academy of Arts.
