= Joseph Henderson (artist) =

Scottish painter

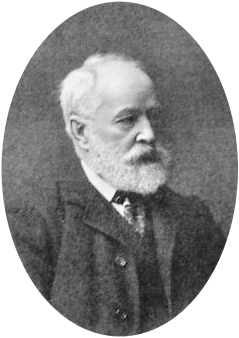
- Born: 6 October 1832; Stanley, Perthshire
- Died: 17 July 1908 (aged 75); Ballantrae, Scotland
- Known for: Painting

Joseph Henderson (6 October 1832 - 17 July 1908) RSW (1832–1908) was a Scottish landscape painter, genre painter, portrait painter and marine painter. His genre was particularly painting working men such as shepherds, crofters, pedlars, cobblers, fishermen and farm labourers. However he also painted Scottish country and coastal scenery.

== Biography ==
Henderson studied at the Trustees Academy in Edinburgh and started to work as a portrait painter but having done so for about twenty years he discovered his true vocation which was marine painting. He marveled the painting of the sea in all its different conditions and light. He exhibited his work at the Royal Scottish Academy and at the Royal Glasgow Institute of the Fine Arts. He also exhibited at the Royal Academy in London from 1871 to 1886 and in Suffolk Street Galleries from 1882 to 1884. He was the President of the Glasgow Art Club, in which city he settled in 1852. He died at Ballantrae, South Ayrshire on 17th July 1908. He is buried at Sighthill Cemetery.

== Family ==
Henderson married three times: in 1855, Helen Cosh; in 1869, Helen Young of Strathaven (died 1871); and in 1872, Eliza Thomson.

Two of his sons John Henderson (1860–1924) and J. Morris Henderson also known as Joseph Morris Henderson RSA (1863–1936) also became painters in their own right.

His daughter Marjory Henderson (1856–1936) married the well known Scottish painter William McTaggart, who painted in 1894 a wonderful portrait of Joseph Henderson which was presented by the family of Joseph Henderson in 1925 to the Glasgow Museums.

== See also ==
- List of Scots
