= John Crawford Brown =

Scottish landscape painter (1805–1867)

John Crawford Brown ARSA (1805 – 8 May 1867) was a Scottish landscape painter.

== Life ==
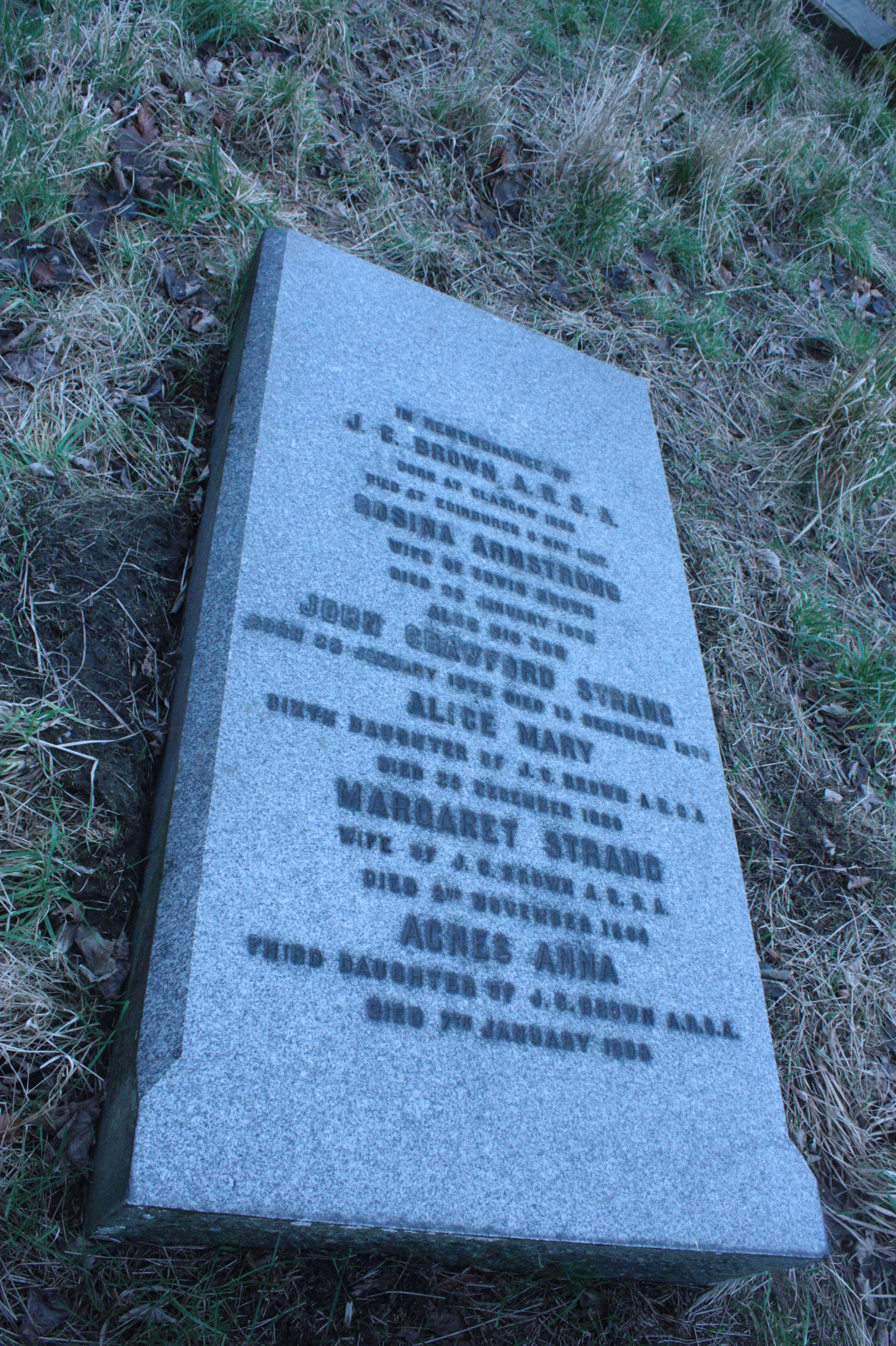
The grave of John Crawford Brown ARSA, Warriston Cemetery, Edinburgh

He was born in Glasgow and resided in London for some time after travelling in the Netherlands and Spain. He then returned to his native city, before settling in Edinburgh.

He was an associate of the Royal Scottish Academy. His picture 'The Last of the Clan' was engraved by W. Richardson for the Royal Association of Fine Arts, Scotland, in 1851.

In 1833, he exhibited at the Royal Academy, No. 278, 'A Scene on the Ravensbourne, Kent'; at this period he resided at 10 Robert Street, Chelsea. He also exhibited two other landscapes in this same year at the British Institution and the Suffolk Street Exhibition.

Crawford lived at 10 St Vincent Street in Edinburgh's Second New Town.

He died in Edinburgh on 8 May 1867. He is buried with his wife, Margaret Strang, and children in Warriston Cemetery in the north of the city. The granite tombstone is vandalised. It lies close to the now sealed eastern entrance gate on the south side of the main east–west path.

== Family ==
He was married to Margaret Strang.

Their eldest daughter Margaret Pollok Brown (d.1917) married David Currie of HM Customs.

== Known works ==
see

- Shipwrecked
- Return from Waterloo

== Sources ==
- Samuel Redgrave, A Dictionary of Artists of the English School, 1878
