= Robert Bain (artist) =

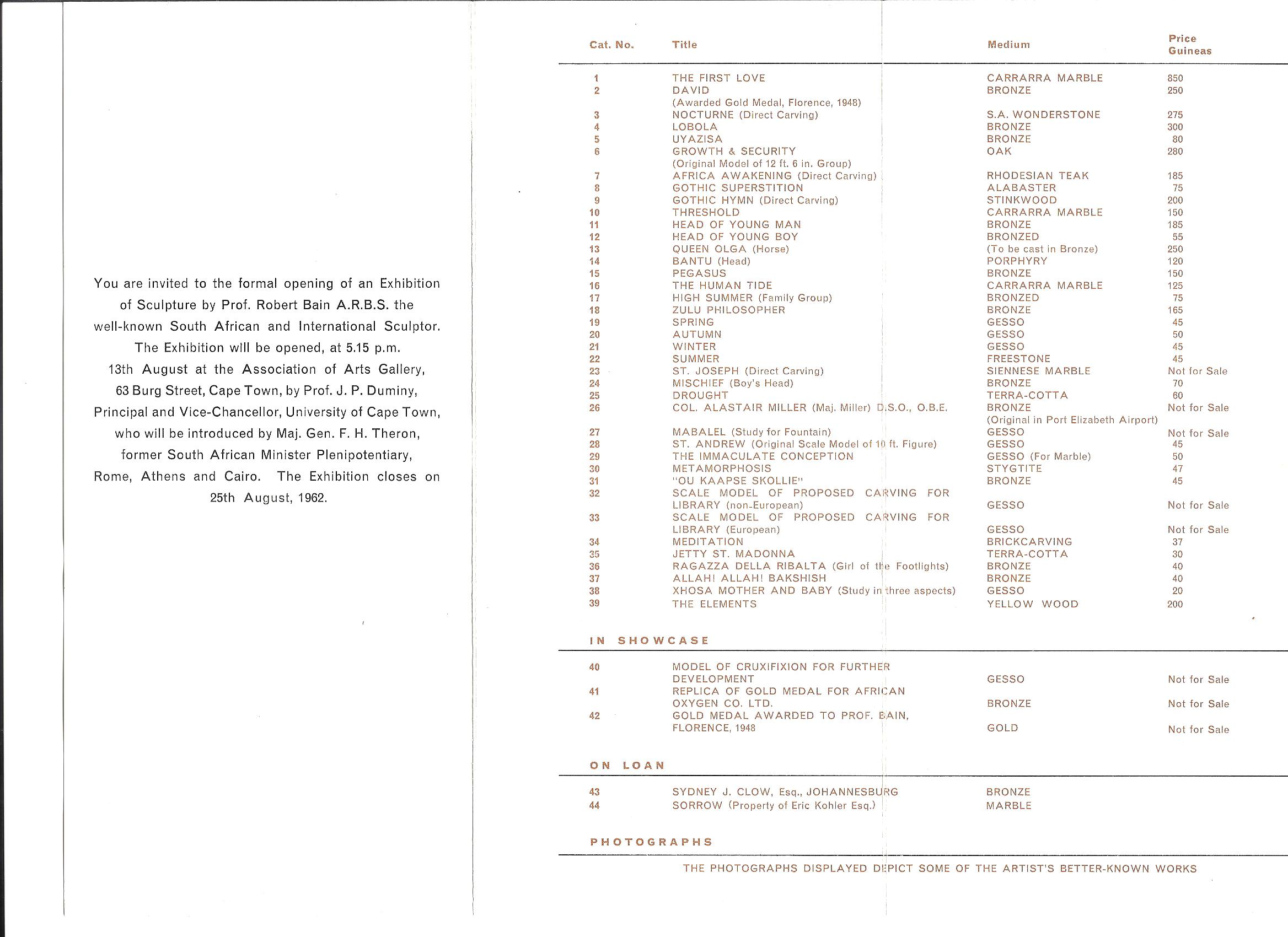
A catalogue from an exhibition he held in Cape Town - August 1962. No.42 - The gold medal he was awarded at the Florence academy was on display.

Robert Bain (1911–1973) was a sculptor and professor of art in South Africa.

== Biography ==
Bain was born in Edinburgh, Scotland, where he completed his formal education and his art studies. He married Mary Lochiel in 1932; they had one child, Robert (b. 1935),

In 1937, he and his family moved to South Africa, where he took up a post as senior lecturer at the Port Elizabeth School of Art, leaving to serve in the army in North Africa and Italy from 1939 to 1944.

In 1948, he went to Florence where he attended the Accademia di Belle Arti Firenze, where he received the academy's gold medal for his sculpture of a modern David.

== Career ==
Bain went on to become head of the Johannesburg School of Art, the pre-eminent art school in South Africa, holding the post for 15 years.

== Works ==
During his career Bain held many exhibitions in Johannesburg, Port Elizabeth and Cape Town where a great deal of his work was sold to private collectors; he also did numerous commissions.

Among his major works are:

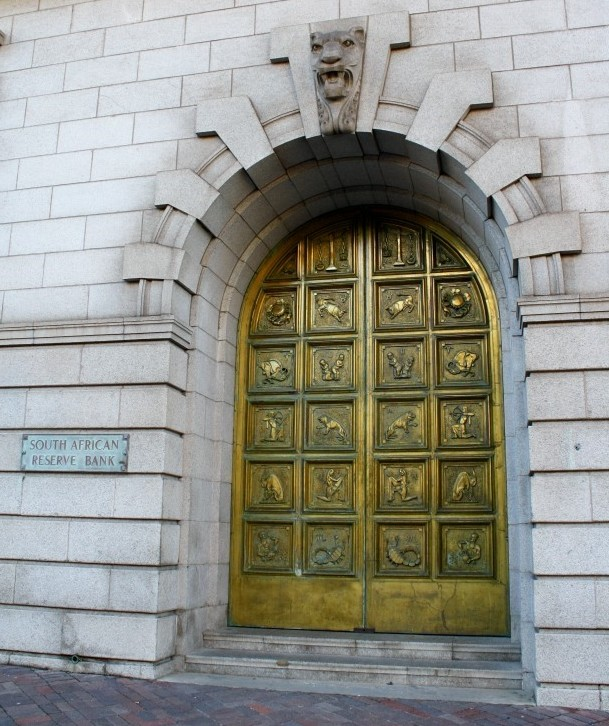
The Bronze Relief Doors

- A bust of Major Allister Miller (South Africa's pioneer aviator) housed in the Port Elizabeth International Airport.
- The Bronze Relief Doors (10 ft × 6 ft) (the signs of the Zodiac) for the South African Reserve Bank in Port Elizabeth.
- A 12 ft modern concrete Christ in Port Elizabeth.
- A twice life-size Bust of King George VI whom he sketched on the royal tour of South Africa.
- A statue titled "Lobola" (the African purchase of a bride) which was presented to General Jan Smuts.
- The Anton van Wouw Foundation commissioned him to do the complete restoration of all the von Wouw plaster statues (the Hunting Bushman, The Scout, etc.)
- South African Airways commissioned him to do a new emblem for them. He did a large modern "Flying Springbok" in gold anodised aluminium.
- Presentation plaques for the South African Agricultural Society.
- The Johannesburg tercentenary medallion was another of his designs.
- One of the larger works, a modern "St. Andrew" in concrete (approx. 8 ft high), is housed at St. Andrew's School for Girls in Johannesburg.
- A still larger work titled "Growth and Security" (12 ft high in reconstructed stone) was commissioned by an insurance company in what was then Salisbury, Rhodesia.
