= Penelope Beaton =

Scottish painter (1886–1963)

Penelope Beaton ARSA RSW
- Born: 1886; Edinburgh
- Died: 12 May 1963 (aged 76–77); Edinburgh
- Education: Edinburgh College of Art
- Occupations: Artist, painter
- Movement: Expressionism

Penelope Beaton ARSA RSW (1886-1963) was a Scottish watercolour painter influenced by the expressionism movement. A member of both the Royal Scottish Academy and the Royal Society of Watercolour Painters, Beaton was both an alumna and a senior lecturer at the Edinburgh College of Art and had her work exhibited widely across Scotland.

== Early life ==
Beaton was born in Edinburgh and studied at the Edinburgh College of Art, graduating in 1917. After commencing her studies she briefly worked as a school mistress at Hamilton Academy. Her former pupils included one of the Glasgow Girls Mary Nicol Neill Armour, who reportedly was greatly encouraged by Beaton's support. Beaton subsequently became a member of the faculty staff at Edinburgh College of Art (ECA) in 1919, eventually becoming the Head of the Junior Department. Notable colleagues included John Maxwell who was appointed as her assistant. He later became a senior lecturer in painting and drawing at the ECA and a notable painter in what came to be known as the Edinburgh School.

== Painting career ==
Beaton's work was exhibited widely throughout Scotland, including 102 works at the Royal Scottish Academy, as well as the Glasgow Institute of the Fine Arts and the Royal Scottish Society of Painters in Watercolour. Between 1925 and 1964 she was a regular exhibitor with the Scottish Society of Artists and from 1928 to 1964 with the Royal Glasgow Institute of the Fine Arts. Beaton was elected an Associate member of the Royal Scottish Academy in 1957.

Beaton's early use of colour was influenced by the expressionistic style of William George Gillies who both trained and taught with her at the ECA. Like Gillies, Beaton worked in both oil and watercolour. Inspired by the jagged east coast and the scenery of Scotland, Beaton created a number of landscapes including a series based on the shoreline of Iona, the earliest of which was exhibited at the Edinburgh College of Art's second exhibition of former students.
