= Beatrice Huntington =

Scottish artist, sculptor and musician

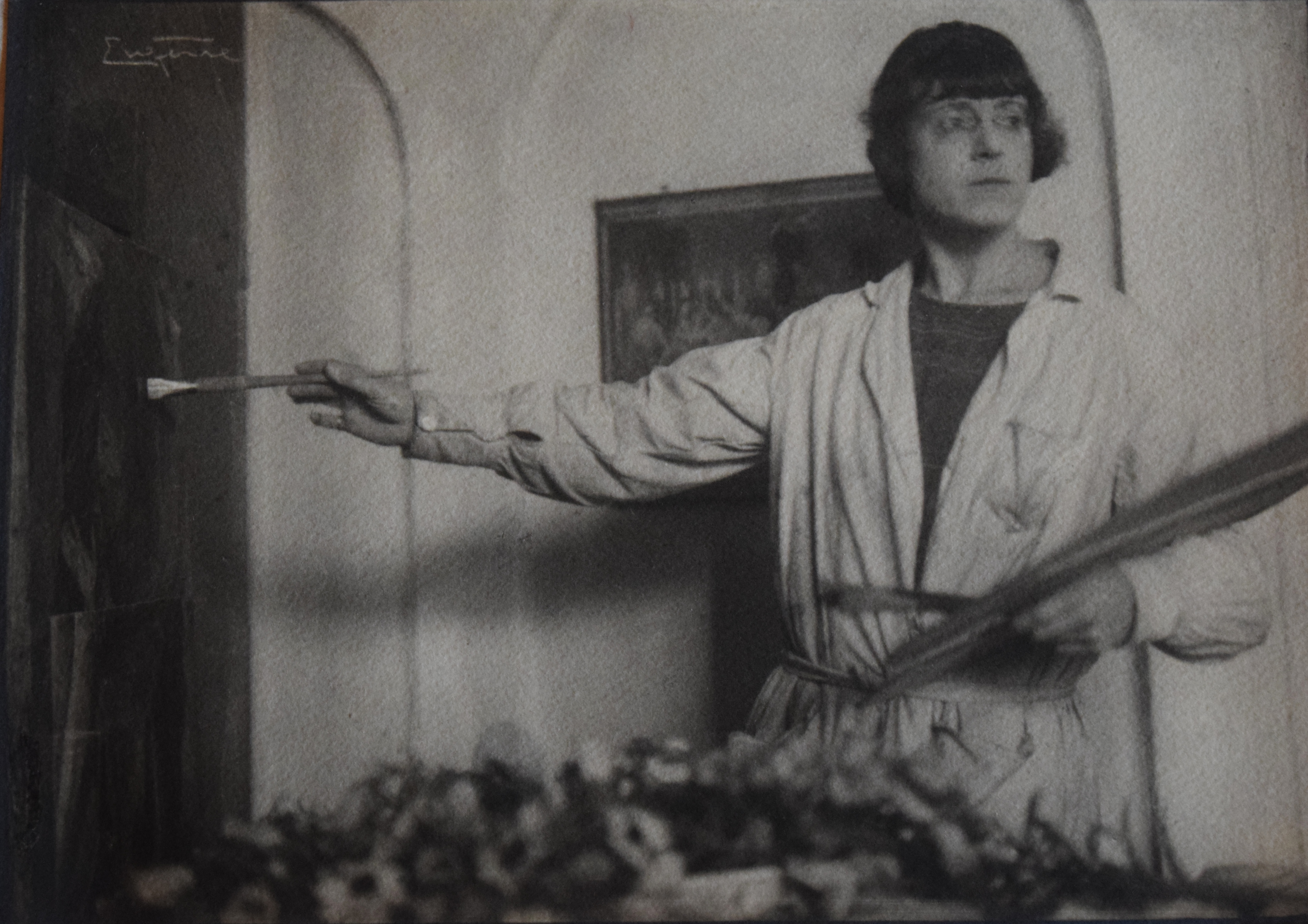
Beatrice Huntington painting, circa 1920

Beatrice Huntington (1889– 13 April 1988) was a Scottish artist, sculptor and musician exhibiting regularly at the Royal Academy, Royal Scottish Academy and the Royal Glasgow Institute. A natural colourist, she is most celebrated as a portrait painter.

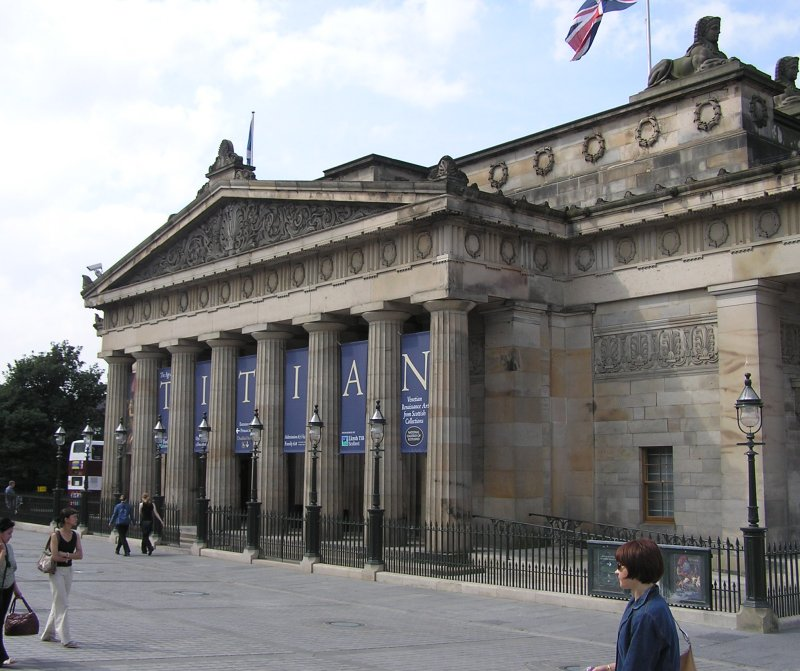
The RSA building, where Beatrice Huntington exhibited regularly, viewed from the south

== Early life and education ==
Beatrice Huntington was born in St Andrews, Fife, in 1889. She was the middle daughter of Dr William Huntington, an eminent St Andrews surgeon, and Charlotte Huntington, nee Bowles. In her early years, she attended her local primary school, Kilrule School, and later studied at Madras College, St Andrews, where she excelled at music and drawing.

In 1906, aged seventeen, she moved to Paris, "through the good offices of her mother", to study drawing and painting. In 1911, after a successful period of study in Paris, she went on to Munich to continue her artistic training at the Heinrich Knirr painting school. Knirr described Huntington as a "quite wonderful artistic phenomenon".

In 1914, she moved to London and, in the period that followed, exhibited her work with the Society of Women Artists. In 1916 she exhibited a portrait of her mother at the Grosvenor Gallery with the International Society of Sculptors, Painters & Gravers.

== Post First World War ==
After the end of World War One, in 1919, Huntington exhibited a portrait entitled Mrs Mappin in Paris. Returning to St. Andrews, Huntington became an active member of the Dundee Art Society. In 1920, she joined the Society of Scottish Artists. In 1923, an article in The Times described Huntington's painting, A Muleteer from Andalucia, exhibited at the Scottish Artists' Society in Edinburgh, as "Prominent among the figure work."

During this period, Huntington also exhibited at the Allied Artists Association in London and with the Dundee Art Society.

In 1924, already an accomplished musician, Huntington spent a summer in Leipzig studying the cello under the instruction of the cellist Julius Klengel.

It is in Dundee that she reportedly met William Macdonald (1883-1960). Macdonald was also a painter and a close friend of the Scottish Colourists Samuel J. Peploe and F.C.B. Cadell. He was known for his landscape paintings and in particular for his affinity with Spain, so much so that he was nicknamed ‘Spanish’ Macdonald.

The couple married at Cramond Kirk in Edinburgh in 1925. They travelled widely together on the Continent, spending time in Cassis on the French Riviera with Samuel Peploe and in Southern Spain. They also spent time in Kirkcudbright with the artists Jessie M. King and E.A. Taylor.

In 1928, after an extended stay in the Spanish hill-town of Aragon, an exhibition of both their work, entitled ‘Pictures of Spain’, was held at Messrs Watt & Sons, Dundee. In 1929, the couple celebrated the birth of their son, Julius, and moved to live in a flat in Hanover Street, Edinburgh. They spent time in Canada during World War II, but the flat in Edinburgh was to remain the couple’s home for the rest of their lives.

== Period most active: 1920s–1940s ==
Huntington and her husband spent large amounts of time in Spain, France and Canada. The influence of these trips are reflected in some of her work; notably A Muleteer from Andalucia. This painting particular, along with other works from the 1920s (e.g. Artist's Model; Scottish Midwife and A Cellist) are thought to show elements of the Cubist approach as they "are strongly expressive in the geometrical arrangement of colour echoing the language of cubism."

During the 1930s–40s, Huntington regularly exhibited at the Royal Academy, the Royal Glasgow Institute of the Fine Arts and Royal Scottish Academy. She was a member of the hanging committee at the Royal Scottish Academy until she resigned on a point of principle before the outbreak of World War Two. Her painting Nurse and Baby, painted during her time in London around 1915, was exhibited in the Royal Scottish Academy in 1939 and again in 1948, in the Royal Academy in London, from which it was selected for a tour of provincial galleries.

== Later life ==
Following the end of the Second World War, Huntington started exhibiting with the Scottish Society of Women Artists (which she joined in 1951) and she enjoyed some success as a portrait painter. However, due to her husband suffering from a prolonged bout of ill health, Huntington spent much of her time nursing him and was unable to do much painting in this period as a result. Macdonald died in 1960. In the decades which followed, Huntington set up a salon which young people were invited to visit and took up portraiture once more. She died in her sleep in 1988, aged ninety-nine.
