= Elizabeth York Brunton =

British artist (1880-c.1960)

- Born: 1880; Musselburgh, Scotland
- Died: c. 1960; Edinburgh
- Education: Edinburgh College of Art
- Known for: Painting, print making

Elizabeth York Brunton (1880 – c. 1960) was a Scottish artist renowned for her painting in both oils and watercolours as well as her innovative use of colour woodcuts. Although she spent most of her life in Edinburgh, her exhibiting career was mainly overseas.

== Biography ==
Brunton was born in Musselburgh and studied at the Edinburgh College of Art. She continued her studies in Paris as a pupil of Edouard Nevellier. Brunton often painted views of markets on the continent in both oil paint and watercolour. In Paris, she exhibited a statute at the Salon des Artistes Francais in 1925 and coloured wood engravings at the Salon d'Automne in 1929 and 1930.

Brunton became a member of the Colour Woodcut Society and had prints exhibited at the Society of Graver Printers in Colour between 1924 and 1932, and eventually became a member of that Society. Her print work featured in a number of international exhibitions, including shows in New York, Boston, Leipzig and in France, Holland and Japan. A Japanese influence can be seen in her prints of birds and animals. Although she largely exhibited her work overseas, Brunton also showcased her pieces within her native Scotland, with works displayed at the Royal Scottish Academy, the Scottish Society of Women Artists and the Royal Glasgow Institute of the Fine Arts, where she exhibited around nineteen pieces. The British Museum holds eleven examples of her prints.
