= Mardi Barrie =

Scottish artist and teacher (1930–2004)

- Born: 1930; Kirkcaldy, Scotland
- Died: 2004 (aged 73–74)
- Education: University of Edinburgh, Edinburgh College of Art
- Known for: Painting

Mardi Barrie (1930–2004) was a Scottish artist and teacher.

== Biography ==
Barrie was born in Kirkcaldy in Fife. She attended the University of Edinburgh before studying art at the Edinburgh College of Art from 1948. After graduating in 1953, she taught at Broughton High School in Edinburgh.

Barrie's first solo exhibition was at the Douglas & Foulis Gallery in Edinburgh in 1963, after which she participated in several group shows, both in the UK and overseas. A second solo show at Douglas & Foulis took place in 1966. She also exhibited regularly at the Scottish Gallery in Edinburgh and at the Bruton Gallery in Somerset. During the 1980s she had three solo exhibitions at the Thackeray Gallery in London.

Works by Barrie are held by several museums and other organisations in Scotland, including Kelvingrove Art Gallery and Museum, the Scottish National Gallery of Modern Art and also the Scottish Arts Council and some Scottish Education Authorities. Outside of Scotland, Magdalen College and the Laing Art Gallery hold examples. Barrie was a member of the Royal Scottish Watercolour Society.
