= John Henderson (painter) =

Director of the Glasgow School of Art
- In office 1917 – 1924
- Preceded by: Fra Newbery
- Succeeded by: John Daniel Revel

Personal details
- Born: 1860
- Died: 1924 (aged 63–64)
- Education: Glasgow School of Art
- Occupation: Artist, educationalist

John Henderson (1860-1924) was a Scottish Glaswegian landscape and portrait painter and Director of Glasgow School of Art

== Family ==
John Henderson was the brother of the painter Joseph Morris Henderson RSA (1863-1936) and the son of the Scottish Glaswegian painter Joseph Henderson RSW (1832-1908). His sister, Marjory Henderson married the well-known Scottish painter William McTaggart.

== Biography ==
Henderson was born in Glasgow and studied firstly at the Glasgow School of Art under Robert Greenlees and then obtained a MA at the University of Glasgow. He was a portrait and landscape painter. His first exhibit was in 1884 at the Royal Glasgow Institute of the Fine Arts, where he became a member of the Council. He exhibited until 1924 at the Royal Glasgow Institute, at the Royal Scottish Academy, and the Royal Scottish Society of Painters in Watercolour. In Liverpool he exhibited at the Walker Art Gallery and in Manchester at the City Art Gallery.

He also assisted at the Glasgow International Exhibition (1901) and Scottish Exhibition of National History, Art and Industry (1911) and served as a Governor of the Glasgow School of Art from 1906 to 1918. He was then appointed in 1918 as Director of the Glasgow School of Art having been acting director since 1914. He remained there until 1924. The School of Art and the Glasgow University strengthened their links under his leadership developing an Architectural Degree in 1924 which gave the School a teaching institutional status. He died suddenly in Busby, East Renfrewshire near Glasgow in 1924. During his working time at the Glasgow School of Art he painted a portrait of Andrew Fergus (1827-1887) MD MRCS, which hangs in the University of Strathclyde.
