= Margaret Boden (artist) =

Scottish artist (1912–2001)

- Born: Margaret Tulloch; 17 February 1912; West Lothian
- Died: 25 December 2001 (aged 89); London
- Spouse: Leonard Boden

Margaret Boden (1912–2001) was a Scottish artist known for her portraiture. She worked with her husband Leonard Boden on many of his prestigious commissions.

== Personal life ==
Margaret Tulloch was born in Ecclesmachan, a village in West Lothian, Scotland to Catherine Tulloch and her husband Rev A.P.S. Tulloch, who had been a missionary in India. She had two brothers who were educated at boarding school, while Margaret Tulloch was taught at home as the family could not afford her tuition fees.

Boden met her future husband, Leonard Boden when they both studied at the Glasgow School of Art and they married in 1937. The couple had one daughter, the renowned concert harpist, Daphne Boden.

In her later years she suffered from Alzheimer's disease.

== Education ==
Boden attended the Glasgow School of Art from the age of 15. She later moved to London to study at Heatherley’s School of Fine Art.

== Artwork and career ==
Boden often worked on her husband's canvases, but was not recognised for her contributions. In 1957, Boden supported her husband's painting of Pope Pius XII, which is now in the Vatican.

During the 1930s, both Boden and her husband worked as illustrators.

For around fifty years, Boden exhibited at the Royal Society of Portrait Painters. She also exhibited at the Royal Scottish Academy and the Royal Glasgow Institute. Boden was also an honorary member of the Society of Women Artists.

Boden was commissioned by Elizabeth II to paint the Royal corgis. Other portrait commissions included Beryl Grey, Irene Joyce, Laurence Verney, Baroness Young and the Forte family, and Boden completed her final commissioned work at the age of 87.

Boden often painted artworks of animals, particularly dogs, including works she exhibited with the Society of Women Artists in the 1980s.

== Works in public collections ==
Margaret Boden has paintings held in several public collections including the following,

Title	Year	Medium	Gallery no.	Gallery	Location
'Cruachan II', Regimental Mascot, with Pony Major Lance Corporal A. Sloss	-	oil on canvas	160/85	The Regimental Museum of the Argyll and Sutherland Highlanders	Stirling, Scotland
Cyril Scurr, Dean of the Faculty of Anaesthetists (1970–1973)	c.1973	oil on canvas	RCOA46	Royal College of Anaesthetists	London, England
Geoffrey Tyndale Young, Fellow (1947–1982)	-	oil on canvas	PCF37	Jesus College, University of Oxford	England
His Honor Judge Sir Lawrence Verney, Recorder of London	1998	oil on canvas	4409	Guildhall Art Gallery	London, England
