= John Brown (artist) =

Scottish artist

John Brown (1752 – September 5, 1787) was a Scottish artist.

== Biography ==
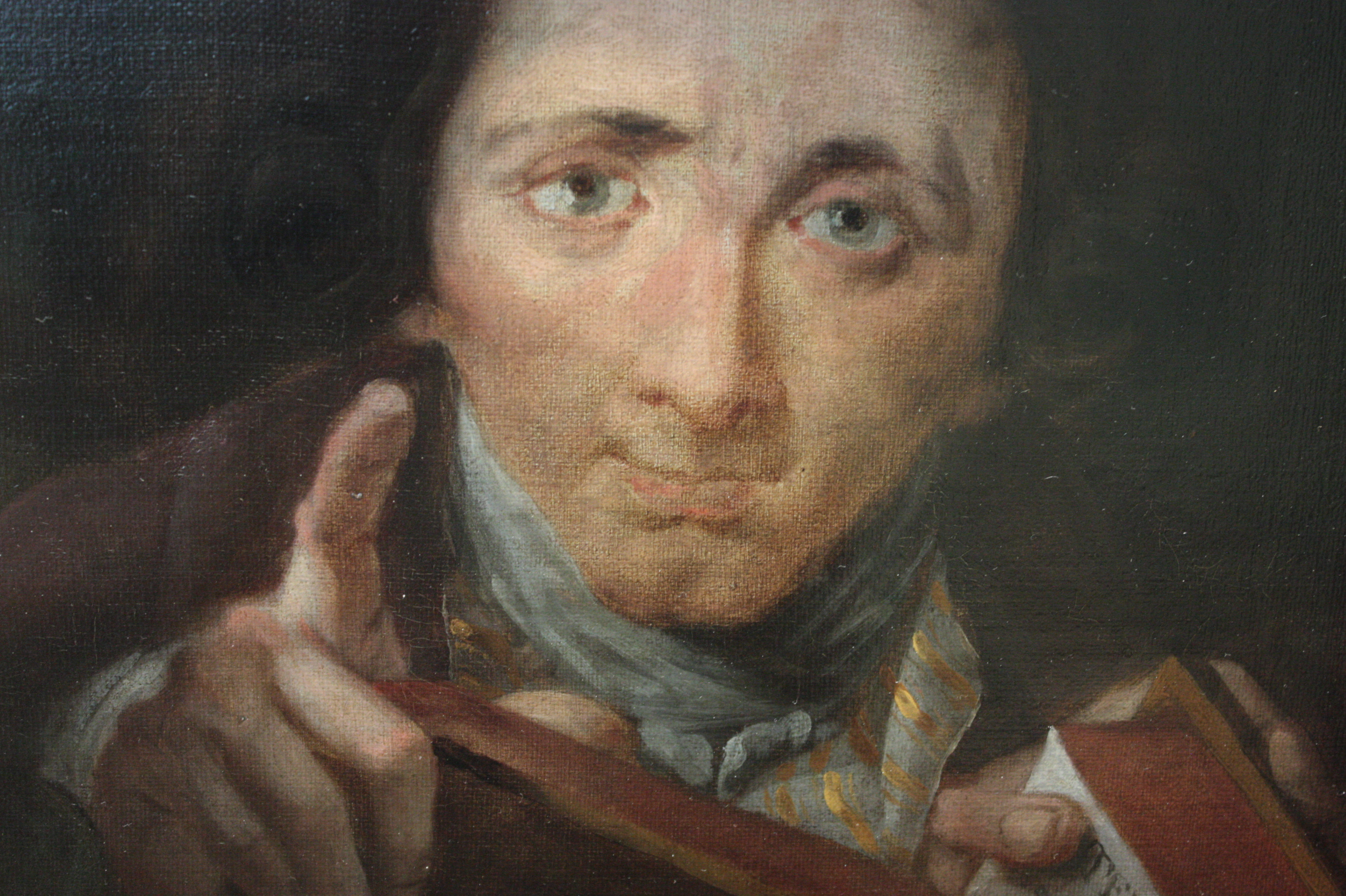
John Brown by Alexander Runciman c.1785

John Brown was born around 1752, in Edinburgh, Scotland, the son of a watchmaker. He studied in Edinburgh at the Trustees' Academy. Around 1769 he traveled to Rome, where he became a pupil of Alexander Runciman. They became strong friends.

For the next eleven years he lived in Rome. In Italy and Sicily he made sketches of the ruins of ancient buildings for his Scottish patrons, William Townley and Sir William Young, and sent drawings to the Royal Academy.

Brown worked on a small scale and favoured pencil, pen and wash as his media. Notable among his drawings are a number of genre scenes, such as Two Men in Conversation (c. 1775–80; Courtauld Institute, London), which show the influence of Henry Fuseli, with whom Brown was friendly.

In 1780 Brown returned to Scotland, and over the next several years drew many portraits of dignitaries, including twenty-five portraits of members of the Society of Scottish Antiquaries.

He lived in London in 1786–87, and exhibited miniature portraits. He returned to Scotland in ill health and died at Leith, Edinburgh's harbour area, in 1787.
