= Howard Butterworth =

Scottish artist

- Born: June 29, 1945 (age 80); Rochdale
- Website: www.howardbutterworth.co.uk

Howard Butterworth (born June 1945) is a Scottish landscape artist working in the North East of Scotland.

Butterworth moved to Aberdeenshire from Yorkshire, England in the 1960s.

In 2006 he created fifteen oil paintings of the River Dee, Aberdeenshire, which were sold for up to £13,000 each, with 30% of the proceeds donated to the River Dee Trust. Queen Elizabeth II purchased one of the paintings.

He has an art gallery, run by his daughter, located between Banchory and Aboyne.
