= Peter Alexander Hay =

Scottish artist

The Eve of St. Agnes by Peter Alexander Hay

Peter Alexander Hay (1866–1952) R.I., R.S.W., R.B.C. was a Scottish genre, still-life, portrait and landscape watercolourist. His work was part of the painting event in the art competition at the 1932 Summer Olympics.
