= Charlie Mitchell =

Charlie Mitchell may refer to:

- Charlie Mitchell (American football) (1920–1999), American football player
- Charlie Mitchell (baseball) (born 1962), American baseball player
- Charlie Mitchell (chef) (born 1992), American chef
- Charlie Mitchell (footballer) (born 1948), Scottish American soccer player and coach
- Charlie Mitchell (hurler) (born 2003), Irish hurler
- Charlie Mitchell (EastEnders), a fictional character on BBC soap opera EastEnders

== See also ==
- Charley Mitchell (disambiguation)
- Charles Mitchell (disambiguation)
