= George Buchan Simpson =

British businessman (1820–1892)

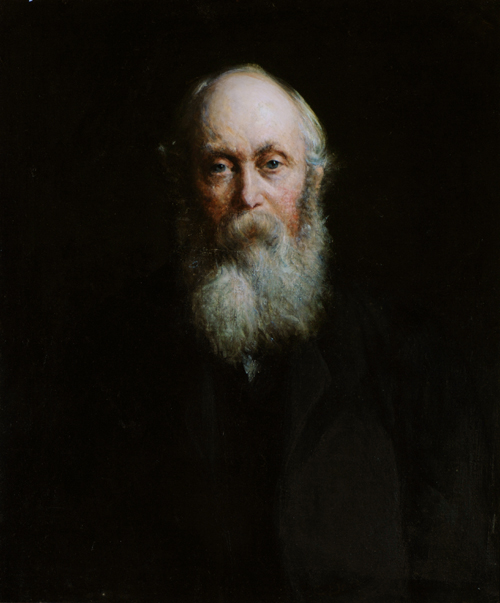
- Portrait of G. B. Simpson by Charles L. Mitchell, c. 1891.
- Born: 10 October 1820; Dundee, Scotland
- Died: 1 July 1892 (aged 71); Edinburgh, Scotland
- Occupations: Jute merchant, art collector, art patron, connoisseur
- Spouse: Margaret Maria Shaw
- Children: two sons and four daughters
- Writing career
- Pen name: G. B. Simpson
- Genres: Art collections, Numismatics, Art patronage

George B. Simpson (10 October 1820 – 1 July 1892) was a Scottish art collector, connoisseur and patron of Scottish painters. He financed his interests through his wealth acquired as a linen manufacturer and jute merchant in Dundee. He is "Dundee’s Forgotten Maecenas" according to a recent academic paper.

== Life ==
George Buchan Simpson was born in Dundee on 10 October 1820. His father was Robert Simpson, a shipmaster and later a flax merchant, and his mother was Janet Buchan. He was educated at Mr. Gilbert’s School in Meadow Entry, Dundee. He married Margaret Maria Shaw on 10 June 1856 at Fettercairn in Kincardineshire. They had two sons and four daughters - Robert John, Jessie, Catherine, Florence, Eleanor and Kenneth. He died in Edinburgh on 1 July 1892.

== Business career ==
Simpson trained in linen manufacturing with Messrs. Alexander Easson and Charles Clark at the Dens Works in Dundee. By the mid-1850s he had gone into partnership with William Ritchie (c.1818-1902) and their firm, Messrs. Ritchie, Simpson & Co., which began with flax spinning mills in Maxwellton and Hawkhill. Later the firm had works in Ward Road, Nelson Street and Lower Pleasance. A decade later the firm had diversified into jute manufacturing. Simpson’s increasing prosperity by that time enabled him to move to Seafield House in fashionable Broughty Ferry. (Grove Academy was later built on the site of this house). He began also to rival local patrons in the arts. However, a downturn in trade in the 1870s brought an end to his partnership with Ritchie. He struggled on with his manufacturing business and eventually retired in 1886. Thereafter he devoted himself to his arts patronage.

== Arts patronage ==
Simpson supported artistic talent and befriended painters such as William MacTaggart, George Paul Chalmers, W. Q. Orchardson, Sam Bough, James Cassie and Alexander Fraser. He was strict in what he expected from these artists. "No Simpson landscape was usually considered complete without the interpolation of a human or animal motif, from boys fishing to cattle grazing." In 1867, Simpson was appointed convener of the committee which organised an art exhibition during the visit of the British Association to Dundee. Simpson was also an ardent collector of books and all kinds of objets d'art. He had a collection of rare books dating from the fifteenth to the 18th centuries and in October 1879 he displayed this collection in Dundee Museum for benefit of his fellow citizens. His collections of coins and medals were sold off in a sale lasting five days. A collection of Simpson's correspondence with George P. Chalmers and Edward Pinnington is to be found in the Royal Scottish Academy's George B. Simpson Collection.

== Professional memberships and appointments ==
- Fellow of the Society of Antiquaries of Scotland, 1870.
- Member of the Numismatic Society of London
- Justice of Peace for Forfarshire
- Member of Broughty Ferry School Board

== Sources ==
- Helen Smailes. "Dundee’s Forgotten Maecenas? G. B. Simpson and the Patronage of Modern Scottish Art". Journal of the Scottish Society for Art History, Vol. 14, 2009–2010, pp. 29–39.
- Dundee Year Book, 1892, Obituary Notices, p. 79.
- Births, marriages, deaths and census information available at the General Register Office for Scotland, Scotland's People Centre in Edinburgh, and also here
