= Charles Mitchell =

Charles Mitchell or Mitchel may refer to:

== Art and entertainment ==
- Charles William Mitchell (1854–1903), English pre-Raphaelite painter
- Charles Louis Mitchell (1859–1918), Scottish artist
- Charles Mitchell (songwriter) (1904–1972), American songwriter of the 1930s and 1940s
- Charles Mitchel (1920–1996), Irish actor and television newsreader
- Chuck Mitchell (1927–1992), American actor
- Mitchy Slick (Charles Mitchell; born 1973), American rapper

== Sport ==
- Charles Mitchell (footballer) (1883–1945), British soccer player
- Charlie Mitchell (American football) (1920–1999), defensive back in the National Football League
- Charles H. Mitchell (1940–2025), American academic administrator and American football player
- Charlie Mitchell (footballer) (born 1948), Scottish American former soccer defender and coach
- Charlie Mitchell (baseball) (born 1962), baseball player
- Charles Mitchell (American football) (born 1989), American football player
- Charles Mitchell (basketball) (born 1993), American basketball player
- Charles Reklai Mitchell (born 1982), Palauan-American footballer
- Charley Mitchell (boxer) (1861–1918), English boxer
- Trey Mitchell (strongman) (Charles Mitchell III, born 1993)

== Politicians ==
- Charles B. Mitchel (1815–1864), American politician
- Charles B. Mitchell (1842–1899), American politician in Mississippi
- Charles F. Mitchell (1806–1865), U.S. representative from New York
- Charles L. Mitchell (1844–1890), U.S. representative from Connecticut
- Charles Lewis Mitchell (1829–1912), state legislator in Massachusetts
- Charles Richmond Mitchell (1872–1942), Canadian lawyer, judge, cabinet minister in Alberta

== Other people ==
- Charles Mitchell (legal scholar) (born 1965), professor of law at University College, London
- Charles Mitchell (colonial administrator) (1836–1899), colonial administrator in the British Colonial Service
- Charles Mitchell (shipbuilder) (1820–1895), British shipbuilder
- Charles Mitchell (c. 1848–1876?), mulatto slave, owned by James Tilton, who escaped from the Washington Territory to the British Crown Colony of Victoria in 1860
- C. Ainsworth Mitchell (1867–1948), English chemist and forensic scientist
- Charles Bayard Mitchell (1857–1942), American bishop of the Methodist Episcopal Church
- Charles E. Mitchell (1877–1955), American banker
- Charles Edward Mitchell (1870–1937), American diplomat to Liberia
- Charles Hamilton Mitchell (1872–1941), Canadian civil engineer and military intelligence officer
- Charles S. Mitchell (1856–1922), American newspaper publisher and editor

== See alos ==
- Charlie Mitchell (disambiguation)
