= American International =

American International may refer to:

- American International Group, a Fortune 500 insurance company
- American International Pictures, a defunct movie production company
- The American International Building, a skyscraper in New York City
- American International University-Bangladesh, university in Dhaka, Bangladesh
- American International College of Springfield, Massachusetts
