= Chuck Mitchell (disambiguation) =

Chuck Mitchell was an actor.

Chuck Mitchell may also refer to:

- Chuck Mitchell, Joni Mitchell's first husband
- Chuck Mitchell, fictional character in Are We Done Yet?
- Detective Chuck Mitchell, fictional character in Police Station
- Chuck Mitchell, fictional character in The Conners

== See also ==
- Chucky Mitchell, footballer
- Charles Mitchell (disambiguation)
