= Edward Pinnington =

- Born: 1 January 1846; Blairgowrie, Perthshire, Scotland, U.K.
- Died: 22 June 1921 (aged 75); Thornton, Fife U.K.
- Occupations: Writer; biographer; art historian; journalist
- Spouse: Margaret Forbes
- Children: Three sons
- Writing career
- Genres: Non-fiction, biography, art history, journalism

Edward Pinnington (1846–1921) was a Scottish art historian, biographer and journalist. He is mainly known for his authoritative biographies of Scottish artists but he also wrote several articles on Robert Burns and his family.

== Life ==
According to census records, Edward Pinnington was born in Blairgowrie, Perthshire in 1846, though no birth records are available to confirm this. His father was John Hardman Pinnington, an Excise Officer, and his mother, Ann Fishwick. The family seems to originate from Lancashire, England and they lived in various parts of Scotland, namely, the 1841 census: Rose Street, Dundee; and the 1851 census: Logie in Clackmannanshire. The family eventually settled in the Rowans, Cupar Road, Auchtermuchty. Pinnington married Margaret Forbes (1861–1936) on 21 October 1885 in Edinburgh. They subsequently had three sons John Noel (1886–1917), Edward Forbes (1888–1939) and Donald Stanley (1891–1976) who was awarded an OBE and Lloyd's Medal for Bravery at Sea during the Battle of the Atlantic. Edward Pinnington died in Thornton, Fife on 22 June 1921, aged 75.

== Career ==
According to his obituary, Pinnington began his working life as a journalist in the United States and was for a number of years the editor of Scotch American. However, there is as yet no corroborating record of this part of his life, though his style of writing suggests a training in journalism. In 1881, he was living in Edinburgh and by 1891 he had settled in Montrose, living with his spinster sister, Mary Ann, while his wife and family lived with her parents in Glasgow. It seems that his interest in art history began when he researched and published the life and work of the Montrose artist, George Paul Chalmers. Only a hundred copies of this massive tome were printed in 1896, and it is likely that Pinnington was commissioned to write and edit it. Between 1896 and 1912, he produced a formidable stream of books and articles and was an art critic for several Scottish newspapers. It appears that around 1912, the family moved to Argentina. At any rate, his wife and two elder sons are recorded as incoming passengers from Buenos Aires arriving at Liverpool on 22 October 1914. Pinnington himself presumably returned separately. According to his obituary, the family settled in Auchtermuchty at the family home, around 1914. Pinnington seems to have published nothing thereafter, though extracts from his unpublished biography of Sam Bough were published in The Carlisle Journal in 1922, after his death (for details see below).

== Unpublished letters ==
Twenty one letters and a postcard written by Pinnington to George B. Simpson (1820–1892) have survived. They are held in the Royal Scottish Academy's George B. Simpson Collection. These cover the period from 9 March 1891 to 29 September 1891. They mainly concern Pinnington's research into George Paul Chalmers though there is also mention of Pinnington's articles on Robert Burns

== Publications ==
=== Art books ===
- The Art Collection of the Corporation of Glasgow. Glasgow: T. & R. Annan & Sons, 1898
- George Paul Chalmers, R.S.A., and the Art of his Time. Glasgow: T. R. Annan & Sons: Glasgow, 1896.
- Sir David Wilkie and the Scots School of Painters, Edinburgh: Oliphant, Anderson and Ferrier, 1900, ("Famous Scots Series")
- Sir Henry Raeburn R.A . London : Walter Scott Publishing Co Ltd, 1904
- Montrose Public Library by Edward Pinnington.
- A Catalogue of Thirty-Two Paintings by William McTaggart, R.S.A. with a preface by Edward Pinnington. Edinburgh: Scottish Gallery, 1901.
- Projected but unpublished: Life of Sam Bough RSA. (Apart from the extracts published in The Carlisle Journal in 1922.)

=== Published articles ===
In the Burns Chronicle and Club Directory, published by the Burns Federation, Kilmarnock:

- 'Burns Ode for Washington's Birthday.' No. IX, Jan. 1900, pp. 51–65.
- 'The Two Jeans.' No. XIV, Jan. 1905, pp. 96–102.
- 'In the Nursery of the Burneses.' No. XVII, Jan. 1908, pp. 16–23.
- 'Honest Allan.' (Part I), No. XIX. Jan. 1910, pp. 78–89.
- 'Honest Allan.' (Part II), No. XX. Jan. 1911, pp. 62–76.
- 'The Politics of Burns.' No. XXI, Jan. 1912, pp. 75–95.

In the Good Words, ed. by Donald Macleod, published in London by Isbister & Co. Ltd:

- 'Sam Bough, R.S.A. 1897, pp. 597–604.
- 'Jade'. 1898, pp. 166–173.
- 'A Glasgow Art Collection' (first paper). 1898, pp. 247–252.
- 'A Glasgow Art Collection' (second paper). 1898, pp. 324–329.
- 'A Study of Old Dundee'. 1898, pp. 744–751.
- 'Finlaystone'. 1898, pp. 823–829.
- 'William McTaggart, R.S.A.' 1899, pp. 750–756.
- 'The National Gallery of Scotland' (first paper). 1901, pp. 445–452.
- 'The National Gallery of Scotland' (second paper). 1901, pp. 532–540.
- 'A Night on a Scots Salmon River'. 1901, pp. 669–674. [The river North Esk near Montrose]

In The Art Journal, New Series, published in London by H. Virtue & Co. Ltd:

- 'George Paul Chalmers, R.S.A.' 1897, pp. 83–88.
- 'Statues of Robert Burns'. 1897, pp. 238–242.
- 'Robert Brough, Painter.' 1898, pp. 146–149.
- 'Robert Scott Lauder, R.S.A. and his Pupils.' 1898, pp. 339–343 & pp. 367–371.
- 'A Scot's Memorial Reredos.' 1901, pp. 282–284. [Found in a Montrose church.]
- 'Hugh Cameron, R.S.A.' 1902, pp. 17–20 & pp. 297–300. [Born in Edinburgh in 1835.]
- 'Sir Noel Paton, R.S.A.' 1902, pp. 70–72.
- 'Alexander Fraser, R.S.A.' 1904, pp. 375–379.
- 'Tom Scott, R.S.A.' 1907, pp. 17–21.
- 'Mr. George Pirie.' 1907, pp. 364–366.

In The Carlisle Journal, 1922

- 21 extracts from his unpublished biography of Sam Bough were published from 20 January 1922 to 16 June 1922. The biography was to have been published by T & R Annan & Sons, Glasgow.

== Sources ==
- Births and deaths information available at the General Register Office for Scotland, Scotlands People Centre in Edinburgh, and also at http://scotlandspeople.gov.uk.
- Census information available at www.ancestry.com.
- 'The Late Mr. Edward Pinnington.' Unattributed obituary in The Montrose Standard. Information supplied by the staff of Montrose Public Library. There is also a short obituary in The Glasgow Herald, Friday, 24 June 1921, p. 9, but it is only a paraphrase of parts of the Montrose Standard obituary.
- Access to bound volumes of the Burns Chronicle and Club Directory, Good Words and The Art Journal, courtesy of the Mitchell Library, Glasgow.
