= Saga (restaurant) =

Restaurant in New York City

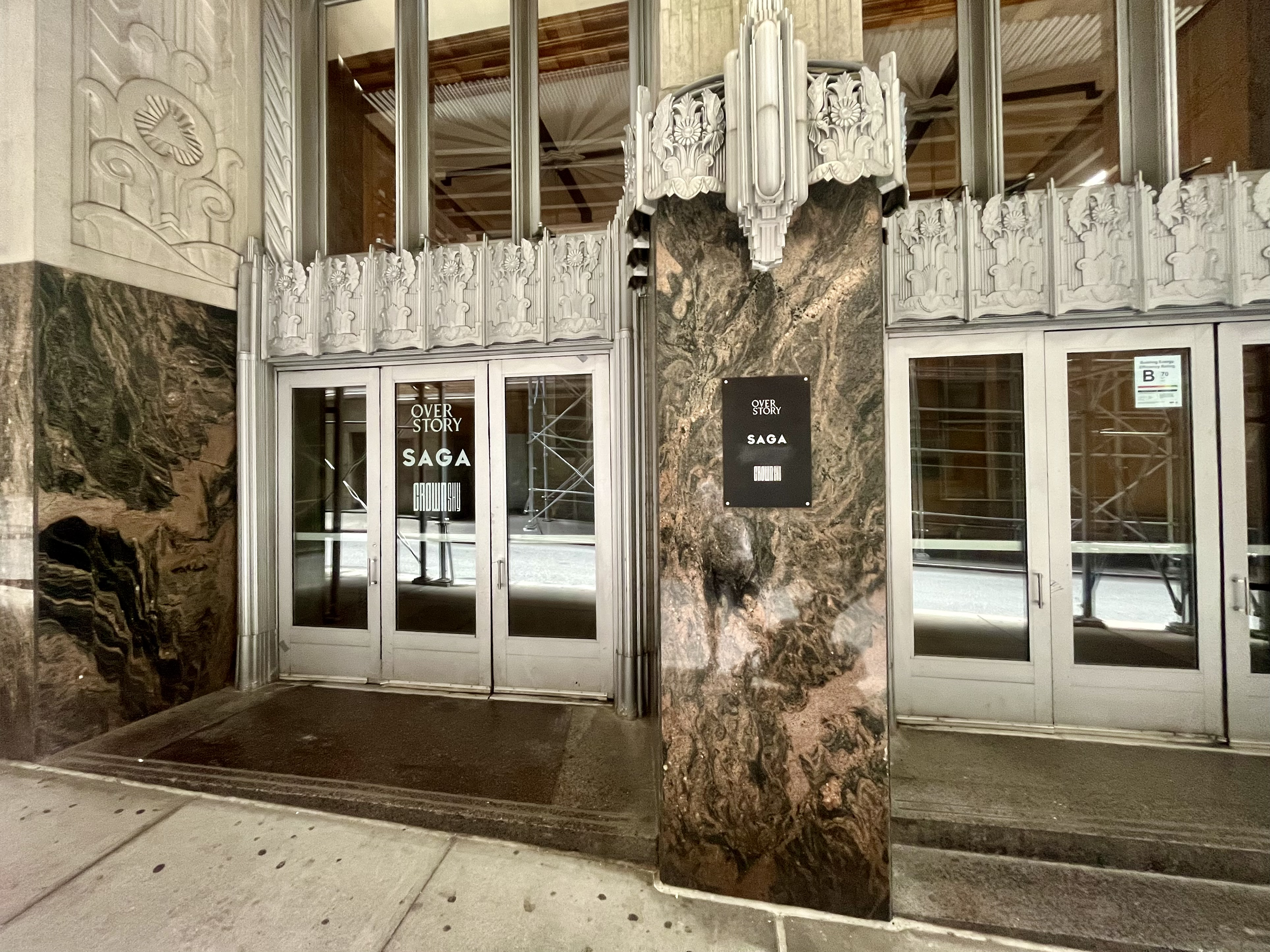
- Entrance to Saga, Overstory, and Crown Shy
- Interactive map of Saga

Restaurant information
- Established: August 25, 2021
- Owner: Kent Hospitality Group
- Manager: Kevin Anderson
- Head chef: Charlie Mitchell
- Pastry chef: Anushana Sharma
- Food type: Soul food
- Rating: (Michelin Guide)
- Location: 70 Pine Street, New York City, New York, 10005, United States
- Coordinates: 40°42′23″N 74°0′28″W
- Reservations: Required, available 1st of each month
- Website: Official website

Saga is a restaurant in New York City located on the 63rd floor at 70 Pine Street in the Financial District. The restaurant has received two Michelin stars and serves a choice of two tasting menus serving American food with a continental European approach. The head chef is Charlie Mitchell; taking over James Kent's job after his death. They are associated with and upstairs from Crown Shy; another Michelin Star restaurant; as well one floor downstairs from the cocktail bar from the same group OverStory; which was ranked as the third best bar in the world and the second best in the United States behind Double Chicken Please on The World's 50 Best Bars in 2023 with the menu including one cocktail from said bar. Time Out New York has rated Saga 4 out of 5 stars.

== See also ==
- List of Michelin-starred restaurants in New York City
