= Charlie Mitchell (chef) =

American chef (born 1992)

- Born: 1992 (age 33–34); Detroit, Michigan, U.S.
- Education: Schoolcraft College
- Culinary career
- Cooking style: New American soulful
- Rating
- Michelin stars
- Current restaurants
- Saga, Manhattan, NY (2024-present)
- Previous restaurants
- Clover Hill, Brooklyn Heights, NY (2020, 2022-2024); Jônt, Washington, D.C. (2020); Eleven Madison Park, Manhattan, NY (c. 2016); Benu, San Francisco, CA (c. 2015)
- Television show
- Bobby's Triple Threat – Guest judge
- Awardss
- Michelin Guide 2022 New York Young Chef Award; James Beard 2024 Award for Best Chef – New York State; Food & Wine 2026 Best New Chefs

Charlie Mitchell (born 1992) is an American chef and restaurateur specializing in soul food with a fine dining approach. Born in Detroit, Michigan, he began his culinary career in his early twenties after leaving college, completing his first formal stage at Benu in San Francisco. He has worked in several fine dining restaurants throughout San Francisco, New York City, and Washington, D.C. In 2021, Mitchell helped to reopen Clover Hill in Brooklyn Heights. As executive chef and co-owner of Clover Hill, he earned his first Michelin star, making Mitchell New York City's first Black chef to receive the award.

In 2022, Mitchell received the Michelin Guide New York Young Chef Award, and in 2024, Mitchell was awarded the James Beard Award for Best Chef: New York State. In early 2025, Mitchell left Clover Hill to become the executive chef of the two-Michelin-starred Saga restaurant in Manhattan's Financial District. Since 2022, Mitchell has appeared on Good Morning America, Today, CBS Saturday Morning, and Bobby's Triple Threat. Alongside his television appearances, he has also been a guest on multiple podcasts and has headlined guest chef dinners across the United States and the Caribbean. In 2025, Saga retained its two-Michelin-star rating with Mitchell as executive chef.

== Early life ==
Charlie Mitchell III was born in Detroit, MI, in 1992 to Cassandra Hall and Charlie Mitchell Jr. His family lived on the West Side of Detroit during Mitchell's adolescence and moved to Southfield, Michigan, when he was a teenager. Mitchell attended Schoolcraft College in a suburb of Detroit; he did not complete a degree.

== Career ==
At 19 years old, Mitchell began his culinary career at 24 Grille in downtown Detroit. While working as a valet, his friend asked a sous chef to get Mitchell a job in the kitchen. This kitchen experience informed Mitchell's decision to pursue fine-dining. He later became part of the Forest Grill team, reaching sous-chef in under three years, in Birmingham, Michigan under Executive Chef Nick Janutol.

Mitchell trained in several fine dining restaurants, many with Michelin stars. His first experience with haute cuisine came through a stage at Benu, the first three Michelin-starred restaurant in San Francisco. In 2016, Mitchell moved to New York City, where he attended culinary school briefly. Mitchell left the program after deciding that the hands-on experience that he received while working was more beneficial than the cost of continuing his studies. After leaving culinary school, Mitchell began seeking employment by searching for nearby restaurants on the internet, subsequently joining the brigade at Eleven Madison Park as chef de partie under Daniel Humm. Mitchell also gained experience in various other fine-dining restaurants, including Betony (now closed), Per Se, Blue Hill, and One White Street, where Mitchell served as executive sous-chef.

=== Clover Hill ===
In 2019, Mitchell planned to move to Norway to continue his career but was unable to make the move because of COVID-19 lockdowns. When the lockdowns began, he instead returned to Detroit before moving to Washington, D.C. While in Washington, D.C., Mitchell helped to open Jônt in 2020, which now holds two Michelin stars. During his time in D.C., he also worked at Bresca, which holds one Michelin star. He returned to New York City in 2021.

In 2022, Mitchell joined Clay Castillo and Gabriel Merino as co-owner, partner, and executive chef of Clover Hill in Brooklyn Heights, marking his first head of kitchen role. As chef de cuisine, Mitchell helped to shape the restaurant's concept, menu, and environment. Musician Laura Lee Ochoa described Clover Hill as her "favorite" Michelin-starred restaurant, noting the distinctive atmosphere created by Mitchell's choices, including the music played during service. Mitchell created the playlists of music that played during dinner services, typically including genres such as R&B, soul music, and hip-hop.

Less than a year after Clover Hill reopened, Mitchell was awarded the Michelin Guide New York Young Chef Award and earned the restaurant's first Michelin star. He is also New York City's first Black chef to earn a Michelin star.

==== Reception at Clover Hill ====
Critics such as Helen Rosner have described his cooking at Clover Hill as ingredient-driven and precise. In 2024, Clover Hill was ranked 46th out of the 100 best restaurants in New York City by food critic Pete Wells, who highlighted Mitchell's use of seasonal ingredients. In his review, Wells noted that Mitchell's commitment to his cooking was evident in the dishes being served. Also in 2024, Mitchell was awarded the James Beard Award for Best Chef, becoming the only chef to be awarded by the James Beard Foundation from the city that year. Helen Rosner of The New Yorker noted that Mitchell's cooking at Clover Hill had "the subtlety and precision of any Manhattan-billionaire canteen," while maintaining a straightforward service style, free of narrative presentations that were often seen in other Michelin-starred restaurants.

=== Saga ===
After it was announced that Mitchell would be joining Saga as executive chef, Daniel Humm (of Eleven Madison Park) told Food & Beverage Magazine that "[Mitchell's] cooking has a rare combination of precision, creativity, and soul – making him the perfect chef to carry Saga's legacy forward." Before the reopening of Saga in early fall 2025, Mitchell traveled and was guest chef at several events.

Mitchell has served as the executive chef of Saga, a two Michelin-starred restaurant in Manhattan, N.Y., since July 2024. He took over the role of executive chef after founder James Kent unexpectedly died. In his role as executive chef, he creates the menu as well as curating the environment of the restaurant, including music and decor. At Saga, Mitchell has maintained a focus on simplicity. Tammie Teclemariam of Grub Street described a transition to a more minimal presentation style under Mitchell, replacing the more elaborate presentations used under Kent. Dishes are presented with minimal description instead of a narrative on the inspiration of the dish, with food writers commenting that the simplified presentations allowed the dishes to stand on their own. His menu planning begins with the selection of local, seasonal ingredients, around which he develops each dish. As of 2025, Mitchell is also a partner of the Kent Hospitality Group, formerly Saga Hospitality, alongside Kelly Kent – James Kent's widow – and Danny Garcia – winner of season 21 of Top Chef and executive chef of Time & Tide.

With Mitchell at the helm, Saga has retained its two Michelin star rating and was rated 33rd on North America's 50 Best Restaurants list for 2025. In September 2026, Mitchell was named as one of Food & Wine's Best New Chefs.

== Culinary approach ==
Mitchell has described his approach to kitchen leadership as prioritizing collaboration and support of young cooks, in contrast with the culture of kitchen brigades that he had worked in. A chef who has worked with Mitchell for several years, Max Guillaume, has stated that working under Mitchell involves frequent collaboration. Chef Kent provided guidance for Mitchell at the beginning of his career as executive chef by pushing him to "stick to the craft, and the rest will fall in line."

=== Cuisine ===
Mitchell primarily cooks in the tasting menu style with a focus on Japanese fish and local ingredients. The menus that he creates are changed seasonally and are modified daily depending on the ingredients being used. Many of the foods that Mitchell cooks are reminiscent of southern soul food, for one of his summer menus he included tempura-style fried fish, cornbread with a caviar topper, and potato salad.

=== Influences ===
Food was used by his family as a means of celebration and community. Mitchell has credited his grandmothers and family gatherings centered on food for sparking his early interest in cooking. While being interviewed by The Ultimate Dish Podcast, Mitchell recounted how as a child his grandmothers would feed everyone and would always have food available. He then said that being able to welcome people into his restaurant any day of the week and to always have food available ties his work to the memories of his childhood. In October 2022 during an interview with The Michelin Guide Mitchell spoke of how much a "good meal can change someone's day," something he learned from watching his grandmother cook. Mitchell also credits Nick Janutol for providing his foundations in fine dining, primarily what is expected of cooks in fine dining kitchens and how to cook.

== Guest chef appearances ==
- November 29, 2023: Chef Gabriel Kreuther and Mitchell cooked for the Dewar's Double Double blended malt launch dinner at The Blond.
- February 28, 2024: As part of "Restaurants Week", a month-long event hosted by the Bermuda Tourism Authority, Mitchell prepared a four-course meal for the final dinner of the event at the Loren at Pink Beach.
- June 22, 2024: For the 50th anniversary of the Rockhouse Hotel and 20th anniversary of the Rockhouse Foundation, Chef Mitchell participated in the "Dinner on the Beach" series in Jamaica with Andre Fowles. The dinner focused on local ingredients, and Mitchell commented that the experience helped him to learn to "let the ingredients tell you what to do with them."
- May 5, 2025: Chef Camari Mick of The Musket Room and Mitchell cooked at the GQ after-party for the 2025 Met Gala.
- June 6, 2025: Mitchell joined Gavin Kaysen at his restaurant, Demi, as a guest chef for a special series titled the "North Star Series." The series included several chefs from Michelin-recognized restaurants. The menu for the North Star series featured a tasting menu and beverage pairings. Other chefs included in the series were husband-wife team Kyle and Katina Connaughton, from SingleThread, and Brandon Jew, from Mister Jiu's.
- August 14–17, 2025: Mitchell was among the chefs that were featured at the Middleburg, Virginia, "Family Reunion," a four-day food festival.
- September 9, 2025: Frasca Food and Wine of Boulder, Colorado, hosted Mitchell and his team from Saga for a one-night guest chef dinner.
- October 2, 2025: Mitchell appeared as a guest judge on Bobby's Triple Threat. He judged 3 rounds between Maneet Chauhan and "the Titans" – Michael Voltaggio, Brooke Williamson, and Ayesha Nurdjaja.

== See also ==
- Haute cuisine – Type of French cuisine
- Saga (restaurant) – Restaurant in New York City
- Soul food – Ethnic cuisine of Black Americans
- Tasting menu – Collection of several dishes in small portions served as a single meal
