= Charley Mitchell =

Charley Mitchell may refer to:

- Charley Mitchell (boxer) (1861–1918), world heavyweight boxing title contender
- Charley Mitchell (American football) (1940–2025), professional American football player

== See also ==
- Charlie Mitchell (disambiguation)
