= James Cassie =

Scottish painter

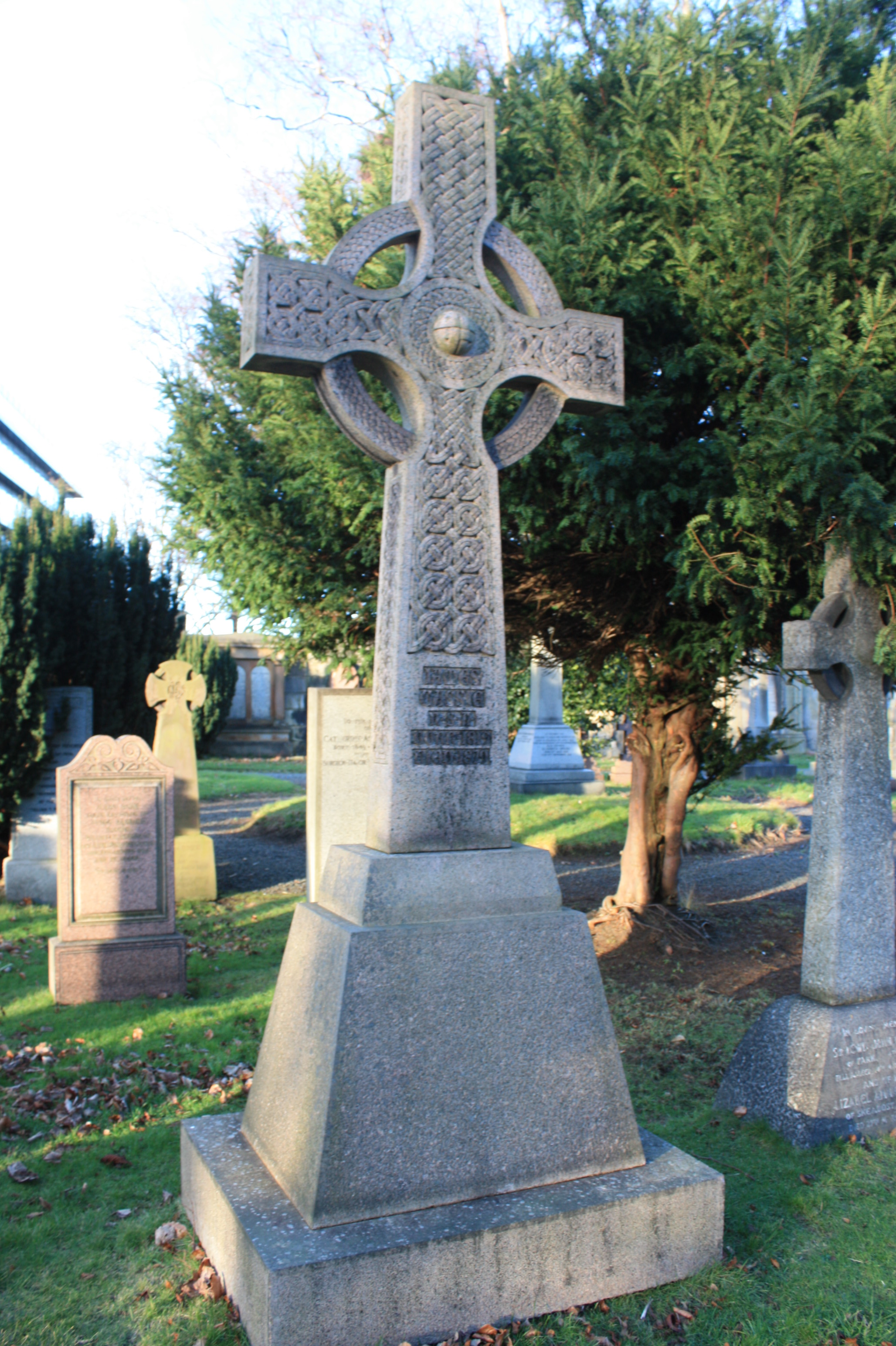
The grave of James Cassie, Dean Cemetery

James Cassie RSA (1819 – 11 May 1879) was a Scottish marine landscape, portrait, genre and animal painter.

== Life and work ==
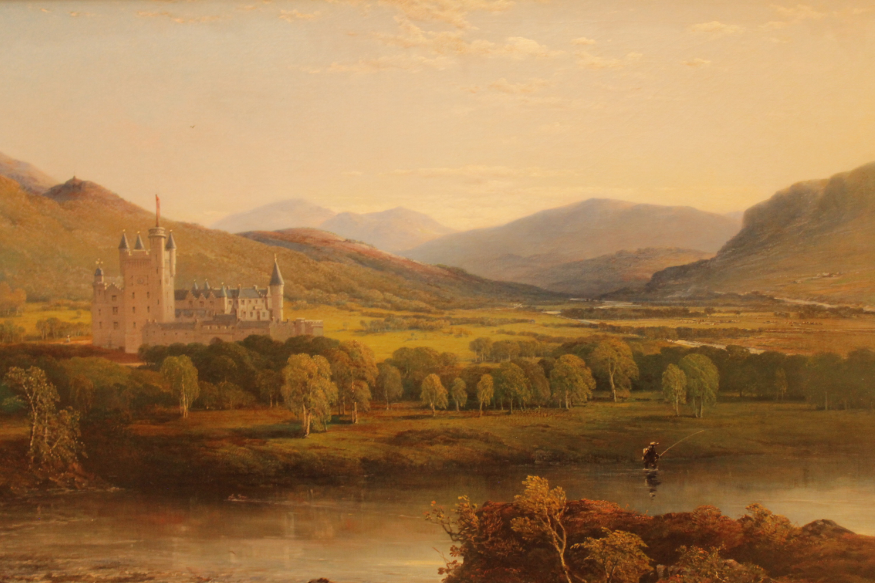
Balmoral Castle by James Cassie 1856

Cassie was born at Keith Hall, Inverurie in Aberdeenshire, in 1819. A childhood accident left him permanently lame. He determined on art as a career and became a pupil of James Giles RSA, a painter of highland scenery and animals. Cassie settled in Aberdeen, where the sea and fisherfolk on its shores provided inspiration for his art.

In his style, he preferred broad harmonious effects to elaborate detail, and he most excelled at marine landscapes. However, he also painted animals, portraits and domestic scenes. He worked in both oils and watercolour, and showed several pictures at the Royal Scottish Academy (RSA), the Royal Academy (RA), and other London exhibitions. In 1869, he was elected an Associate of the RSA and moved to Edinburgh, where he remained for the rest of his life. He was also a member of the Royal Scottish Society of Painters in Watercolour (RSW). In February 1879, he was elected a full member of the RSA, but his health had been failing for some time and he died on 11 May that year.

Cassie was a friend of John Phillip, who painted a portrait of him. An anecdote describes how he and Philip were on a sketching holiday together, in Aberdeenshire and the northern Highlands, when they chanced to meet fellow artist Sam Bough at a remote hostelry. Bough drew some sketches on the spot for the two friends, which Cassie described as "just beautiful".

Cassie is buried in the northern section of Dean Cemetery in Edinburgh on the north side of its central path, towards the western end.

== Selected works ==
- Holy Island Castle.
- Chalk Cliffs, Sussex.
- A Highland Goatherd.
- The Mouth of the Mersey.
- The Mussel Gatherers.
- Morning — East Coast of Scotland (in the Scottish National Gallery).
- Dumbarton Castle Sunset (1874).
