= 70 Pine Street =

Residential skyscraper in Manhattan, New York

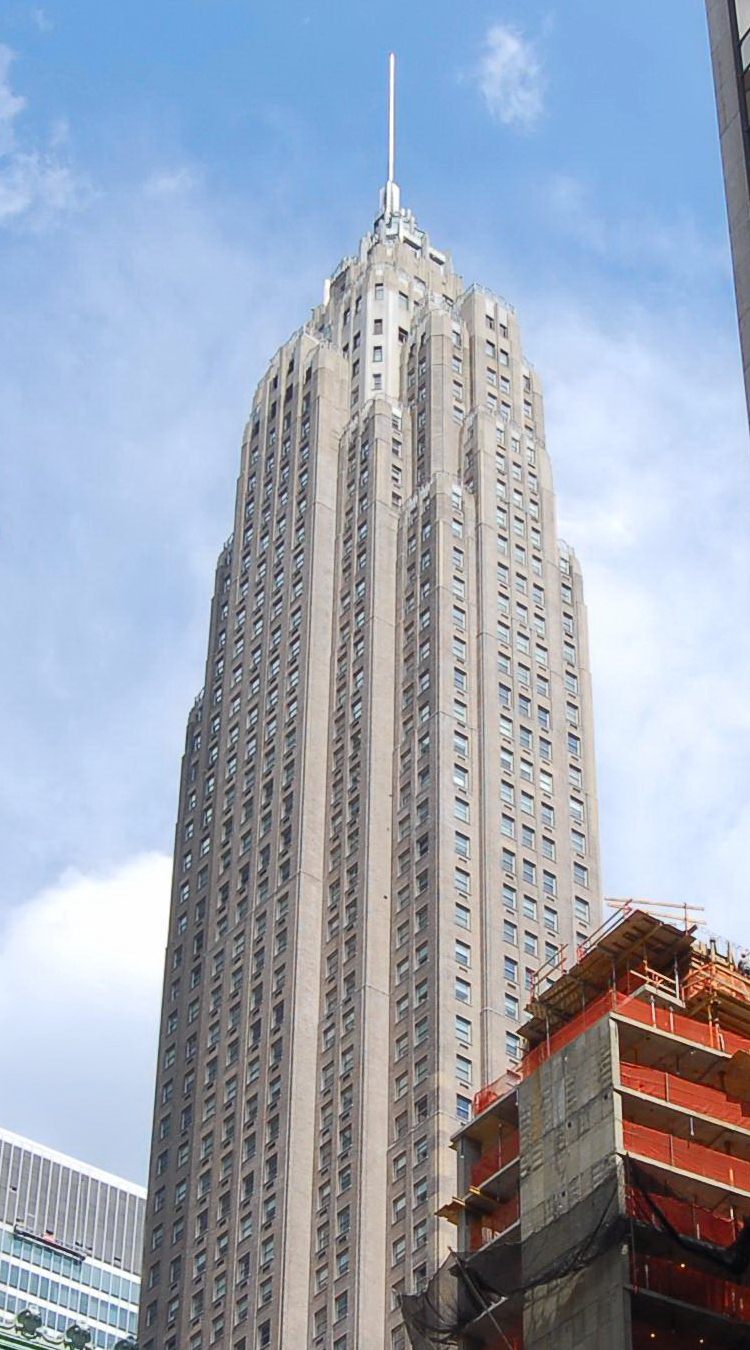
- 70 Pine Street in 2009
- Interactive map of the 70 Pine Street area
- Former names: American International Building

General information
- Type: Residential (converted from offices)
- Architectural style: Art Deco
- Location: 70 Pine Street, Manhattan, New York, United States
- Coordinates: 40°42′23″N 74°00′27″W
- Construction started: 1930
- Completed: 1932
- Opening: May 13, 1932
- Cost: $7 million (equivalent to about $200 million in 2025)
- Owner: Eastbridge Group, AG Real Estate

Height
- Architectural: 952 ft (290 m)
- Roof: 850 ft (260 m)
- Top floor: 800 ft (240 m)

Technical details
- Floor count: 67
- Floor area: 864,988 sq ft (80,360.0 m^{2})
- Lifts/elevators: 18

Design and construction
- Architects: Clinton and Russell, Holton & George
- Developer: Rose Associates
- Structural engineer: Taylor Fichter Steel Construction
- Main contractor: James Stewart & Co. Builders

Website
- 70pine.com

New York City Landmark
- Designated: June 21, 2011
- Reference no.: 2441, 2442

70 Pine Street (formerly known as the 60 Wall Tower, Cities Service Building, and American International Building) is a 67-story, 952-foot (290 m) residential skyscraper in the Financial District of Lower Manhattan, New York City, New York, U.S. Designed by the architectural firm of Clinton & Russell, Holton & George in the Art Deco style, 70 Pine Street was constructed between 1930 and 1932 as an office building. The structure was originally named for the energy conglomerate Cities Service Company (later Citgo), its first tenant. Upon its completion, it was Lower Manhattan's tallest building and, until 1969, the world's third-tallest building.

The building occupies a trapezoidal lot on Pearl Street between Pine and Cedar Streets. It features a brick, limestone, and gneiss facade with numerous setbacks. The building contains an extensive program of ornamentation, including depictions of the Cities Service Company's triangular logo and solar motifs. The interior has an Art Deco lobby and escalators at the lower stories, as well as double-deck elevators linking the floors. A three-story penthouse, intended for Cities Service's founder, Henry Latham Doherty, was instead used as a public observatory.

Construction was funded through a public offering of company shares, rather than a mortgage loan. Despite having been built during the Great Depression, the building was profitable enough to break even by 1936, and ninety percent of its space was occupied five years later. The American International Group (AIG) bought the building in 1976, and it was acquired by another firm in 2009 after AIG went bankrupt. The building and its first-floor interior were designated as official New York City landmarks in June 2011. The structure was converted to residential use in 2016.

== Site ==
70 Pine Street is in the Financial District of Lower Manhattan in New York City, New York, U.S. It sits on a land lot bounded by Pine Street to the south, Pearl Street to the east, and Cedar Street to the north. The roughly trapezoidal site covers 32,000 square feet (3,000 m^{2}), measuring 247 feet (75 m) on Pine and Cedar Streets by 116 feet (35 m) on Pearl Street. The terrain slopes downward to the east, toward Pearl Street, so that there is an upper lobby (accessed from Pine Street) and a lower lobby (accessed from Pearl Street). Neighboring buildings include 56 Pine Street and the Down Town Association building to the northwest; 90–94 Maiden Lane to the north; 48 Wall Street to the southwest; and 60 Wall Street to the south.

== Architecture ==
70 Pine Street is a 67-story building rising 952 feet (290 m). (Note: The defunct Emporis cites a different figure of 66 stories.) The roof is 850 feet (260 m) above ground, while the top story is 800 feet (240 m) high. The skyscraper has a Gothic-like, spire-topped appearance. The architectural firm Clinton & Russell, Holton & George designed 70 Pine Street in the Art Deco style; the structure was the last large commission by these architects. Of that firm's principals, Thomas J. George was likely the most involved with the design. James Stewart & Company was the general contractor, Taylor Fichter Steel Construction was the structural engineer, and John M. Parrish was the project's general superintendent.

The building was constructed as part of an ongoing skyscraper race in New York City, which resulted in the city having the world's tallest building from 1908 to 1974. When completed, 70 Pine Street was the third-tallest building in the world, after the Empire State Building and the Chrysler Building in Midtown Manhattan, holding that rank until 1969, when the North Tower of the World Trade Center surpassed it. The building surpassed the Manhattan Company's building at 40 Wall Street by 25 feet (7.6 m) to be Lower Manhattan's tallest building.

=== Form ===
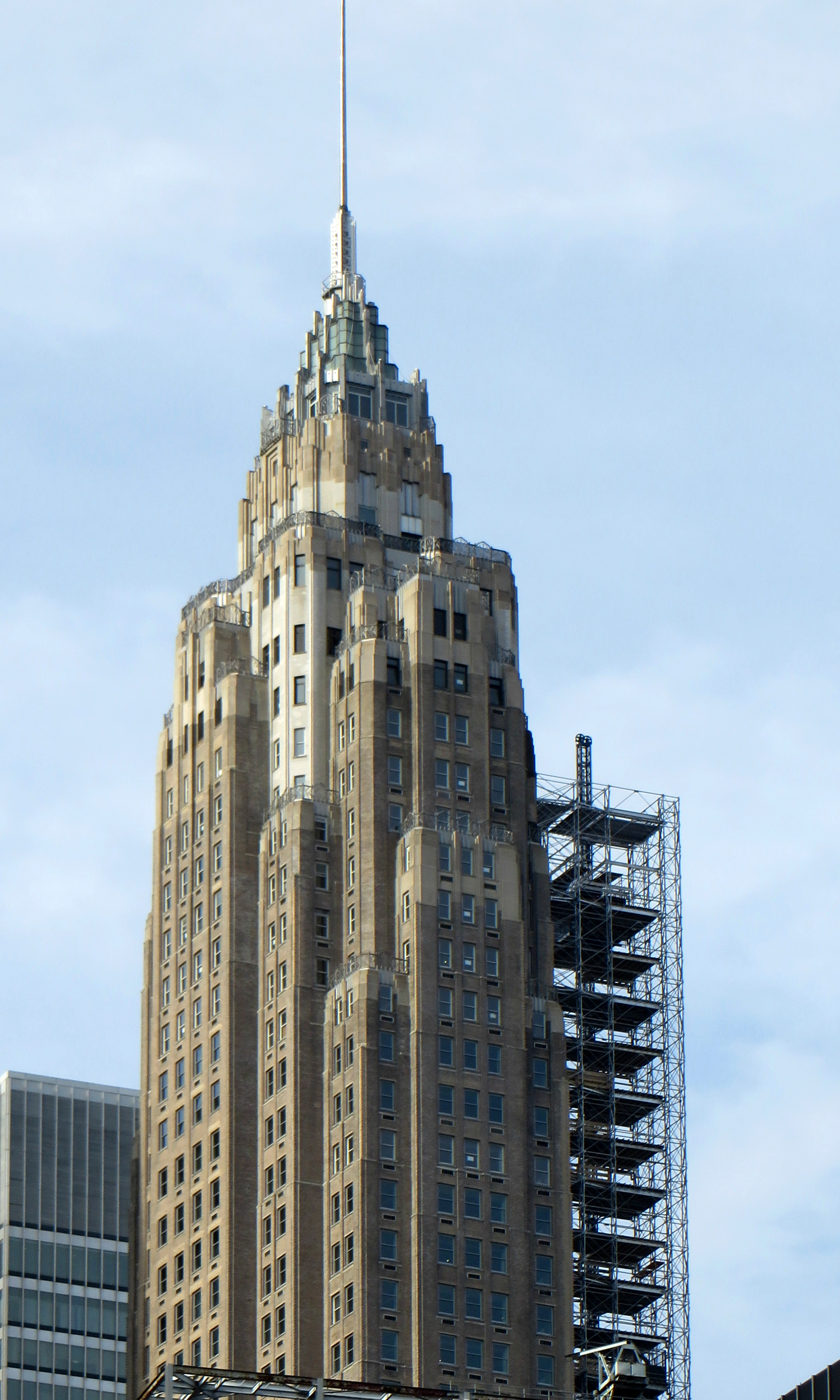
Upper section of the building, showing the small terraces on each setback

70 Pine Street features numerous setbacks on its exterior. Though setbacks in New York City skyscrapers were mandated by the 1916 Zoning Resolution in order to allow light and air to reach the streets below, they later became a defining feature of the Art Deco style. To maximize rentable space while complying with the 1916 Zoning Resolution, the setbacks were placed at regular intervals, with the tops of each setback forming a diagonal line. The setbacks on the north–south and east–west elevations alternate.

The building's 11th through 31st floors gradually step back from the base. The building's shaft begins above the 32nd floor and rises to the 54th or 56th floor, where the corners of the shaft taper off. The intermediate levels contain smaller setbacks, which were used as private terraces for the offices on the respective floors. There were multiple setbacks on each side, so the upper floors contained up to 20 sides. The top stories are one-fourth the size of the lowest stories.

Above the 67th-floor observation deck is the building's spire, which rises 124 feet (38 m) and weighs 8 short tons (7.1 long tons; 7.3 t). It is composed of a glass lantern rising 27 feet (8.2 m) and topped by a stainless steel pinnacle extending another 97 feet (30 m). The author Dirk Stichweh characterized the spire as giving the impression of a mountain peak covered with snow. The spire had a beacon, which the publicist Edwin C. Hill described as being "visible for 200 miles at sea and inland", though the beacon could actually be seen only from 20 miles (32 km) away. W. Parker Chase, writing in 1932, characterized the spire as being "almost sensational in its 'differentness'".

=== Facade ===
The entrance portals and lower-story windows are lavishly decorated. The lower stories of the facade are covered with Indiana limestone, placed above a water table of Minnesota granite. Red-and-black Morton Gneiss wraps the ground floor. The upper stories are clad with four shades of buff-colored brick, which darken toward the building's peak. A parapet with a limestone coping surrounds each coping. An extensive lighting system, consisting of 400-watt lamps, highlights the building's features at night. The presence of the lamps was influenced by Cities Service's role as an energy provider. An early publicist for 70 Pine Street said that Cities Service founder Henry Latham Doherty was personally involved in the structure's design and that "he insisted on dignity with beauty, to the absolute avoidance of the garish, the flamboyant, and the over colorful." Doherty wanted the building to appear "exclusive, rich, yet simple and even a little severe".

70 Pine Street was one of the first buildings to use aluminum extensively on its facade. Cliff Parkhurst (Note: Sometimes spelled "Clif") of the Parkhurst Organization designed the aluminum ornamentation of 70 Pine Street. These ornamental features include reliefs above each set of entrance doors, spandrels with sharp arrises above the lower-story windows, and a ventilation grille on Cedar Street. The reliefs above the doors are designed with motifs of butterflies and sunflowers, which appear as an abstract pattern from a distance. In addition, there were 6,000 windows, ten million bricks, 9,000 cubic feet (250 m^{3}) of marble, and 24,000 short tons (21,000 long tons; 22,000 t) of steel used in 70 Pine Street's construction. The black and pink marble in the building was transported from Minnesota and Tennessee.

==== Entrances ====
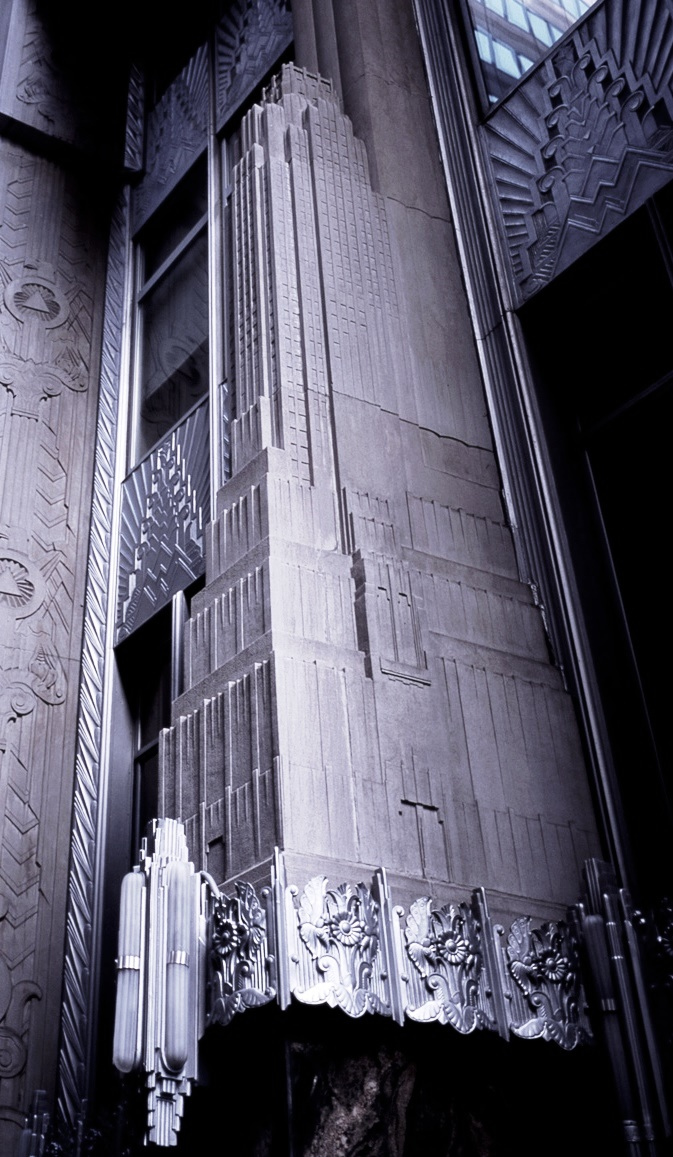
A miniature model of the building, incorporated between the eastern entrance portals on Pine and Cedar Streets

70 Pine Street has five entrances. Four primary entrances, two on Pine Street and two on Cedar Street, all lead to the main lobby. Another entrance on Pearl Street, which was formerly located under the Third Avenue elevated line, has a simpler design and leads to a lobby on the lower level. All of the streets adjoining the building are narrower than the typical street in Manhattan: Pine Street is 25 feet (7.6 m) wide, while Cedar Street is 35 feet (11 m) wide. Because of the slope of the terrain, the western entrances are at the same level as the street, and the eastern entrances are accessed by short flights of steps rising from the street. All four entrances are designed with Art Deco patterns.

The eastern entrances on Pine and Cedar Streets are near the centers of these elevations; they consist of large four-story portals with stepped arches. Each arch is divided by a limestone pillar that contains a freestanding limestone relief of 70 Pine Street. The design of these pillars, each 14 feet (4.3 m) tall, may have been influenced by Rene Paul Chambellan. (Note: Self-referential reliefs were also used in other New York City landmarks such as 20 Exchange Place, 30 Rockefeller Plaza, 500 Fifth Avenue, the Chrysler Building, the Empire State Building, the Fuller Building, and the Woolworth Building.) Architectural critic Robert A. M. Stern wrote that 70 Pine Street's reliefs "surveyed the crowds of workers as a carved Madonna would bless the pilgrims of a Gothic cathedral." There were three metal doors on either side of the pillars. Above the doors are four tiers of sash windows; the lowest such tier was originally composed of glass louvers, which reduced wind pressure when the doors were being opened, but these were later replaced with glass panes. Along the interior reveals of both portal arches are reliefs containing the triangular logo of Cities Service. Inside each entrance were staircases leading to the upper and lower lobbies.

The western entrances on Pine and Cedar Streets are near the western end of the building and are two stories tall. Each portal contains two sets of revolving doors.

=== Interior ===
At the time of 70 Pine Street's construction, developers had to consider skyscrapers' profitability in relation to their height. 70 Pine Street was intended to accommodate between 7,000 and 8,000 employees, more than nearly every other skyscraper at the time. The interior spaces were therefore designed with high capacity in mind. The building contains 864,988 sq ft (80,360 m^{2}) of interior space. When it opened, there was 1,045,000 square feet (97,100 m^{2}) of gross floor area, of which 680,000 square feet (63,000 m^{2}) was available for lease. Offices were arranged in a "U" shape, wrapping around the mechanical core on the north, east, and south. The northern and southern elevations of the facade are staggered because of the setbacks, maximizing natural light in each office.

==== Lobby ====
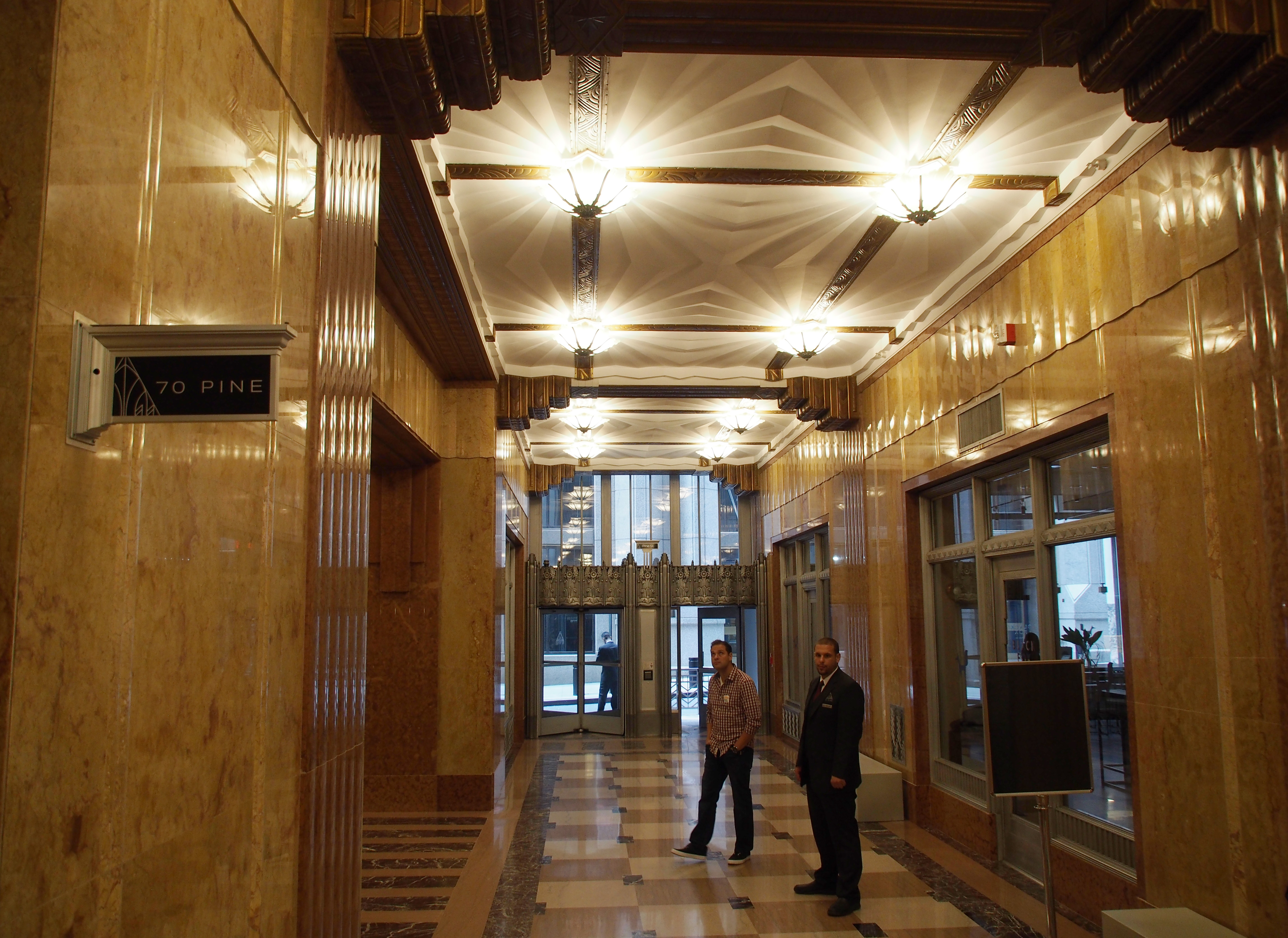
The lobby

The first-floor lobby is designed in the Art Deco style and is arranged into six hallways. Two of the hallways are 110 feet (34 m) long, traveling north to south between the pairs of entrances on Pine and Cedar Streets, while three other hallways are 140 feet (43 m) long and travel west to east; there is also a wide central hall. The passages are 10 to 20 feet (3.0 to 6.1 m) wide, with the widest section of the lobby near Pine Street, where there is an information booth. The lobby is oriented slightly west, away from the elevated lines that formerly overshadowed Pearl Street, so that the westerly entrances could be located at ground level and so that the skybridge to 60 Wall Street would be possible. The layout of the lobby allowed visitors to pass from Pine to Cedar Street.

Inside each entrance are retail spaces that face the first-floor lobby. Four storefronts were located on the southern portion of the lobby. A 2015 New York Times article noted that, until the early 2000s, these retail spaces contained such stores as "a drugstore, a bookstore, a tobacconist and a telegraph office". There are stairs on the southern portion of the lobby near Pine Street, as well as at the eastern portion near Pearl Street; these stairs ascend to the second floor and descend to the basement lobby. There were also escalators between every level from the basement to the sixth floor, near the western entrance on Pine Street.

The basement lobby is a simpler version of the first-floor lobby, serving mainly as a boarding area for the lower decks of 70 Pine Street's former double-deck elevators. The upper decks of these elevators were served from the main lobby; the elevators are arranged along the central hall and the northernmost east–west corridor. The elevator doors are designed with Native American motifs, such as zigzags and sunbursts, along with the Cities Service logo. The elevator frames themselves contain stepped arches. One critic said the use of separate elevator lobbies would "cut the possibility of elevator flirtations exactly in half".

The lobby is decorated with marble walls, plaster ceilings, and aluminum grilles. Despite Doherty's desire for "dignity with beauty", the lobby is highly ornamented with multicolored marbles from Europe, including Roman and golden travertine, Belgian Black, Belgian Grand Antique, Champville, Levanto, and Tinos marbles. The walls are mostly yellow marble, divided by vertical piers of dark-red marble, while the white and pink marble floor panels are arranged in a checkerboard pattern. Large, jagged corbels surround the white plaster ceiling, which has colorful relief bands, which emanate from elements such as the lighting fixtures. Cliff Parkhurst furnished the elaborate metalwork in the lobby. A writer for The New York Times compared the building's lobby to "something Bernini would have designed if he'd lived to see the Jazz Age."

==== Other interior spaces ====
The basement contained a bank vault with the most advanced security systems available at that time. There was also a 400-seat eatery known as the Tower Restaurant, as well as other businesses such as a barbershop, beautician, chiropodist, florist, manicurist, hat cleaner–shoe shiner, sandwich shop, and photostat store. On the fourth floor was a clinic for people who worked in the building. One tenant, boxer Artie McGovern, operated an athletic club on the seventh floor, which was reportedly visited by over a thousand men daily and included a gymnasium, handball and squash courts, ping-pong tables, and golf facilities. On the 29th floor, there was a library filled with law books and documents, which was made available only to tenants. This library had 16,000 volumes and was staffed by a librarian with a bar certification.

Just below the observatory was a conference room with leather paneling. The 62nd through 64th floors contained Cities Service's executive offices, which also had exterior terraces. Doherty's office on the 61st floor was decorated in light colors and was designed to resemble a living room, with couches, chairs, small tables, and other furniture. Cities Service's oval-shaped boardroom occupied almost the entire 64th floor and had leather paneling and high ceilings.

As of 2025, the skyscraper has several amenities, including the Elite fitness center operated by New York Sports Club on the lower level, a food market, and several lounges. Since its 2015–2016 conversion, 70 Pine Street includes 612 residential apartments. The residences are arranged as studio apartments or one- or two-bedroom units and are generally outfitted with wooden floors. Another 132 units are run as hotel rooms by Lyric, a startup company funded by Airbnb. Retail tenants include a gourmet market and a high-end restaurant in the lobby. The building also contains a fitness and recreation center, including a screening room, bowling alley, indoor golf facility, and a game room in the former bank vault in the basement.

==== Observation deck ====
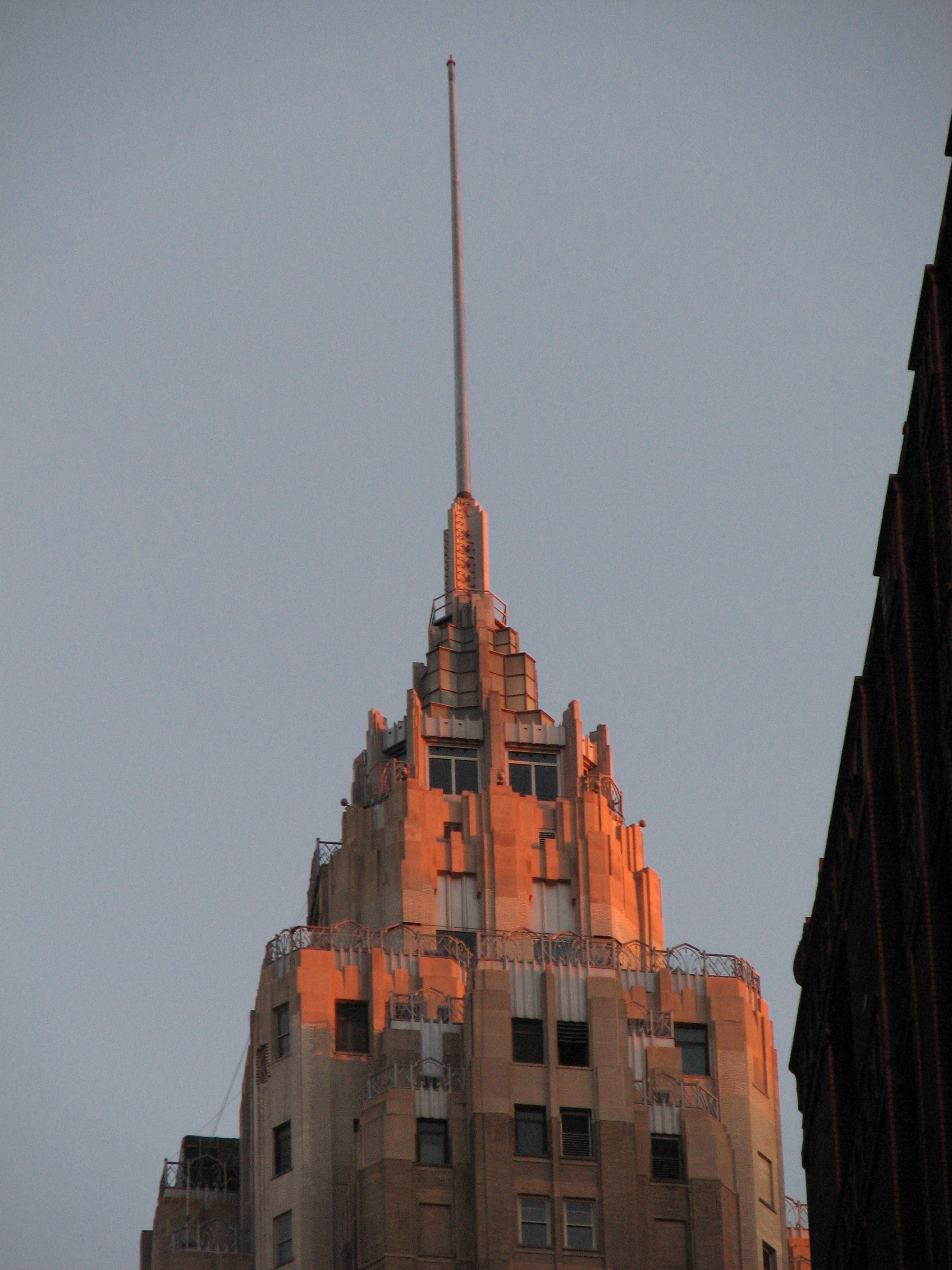
The spire at sunset

The top three floors were originally slated to contain Doherty's private penthouse apartment. The suite included a gym and a squash court, and Doherty's bed was mounted on a motorized platform that could slide out onto the terrace. He ultimately never lived in the space.

In July 1932, the private suite opened to the public as an observation deck, which comprised an open-air platform with a 23-by-33-foot (7.0 by 10.1 m) enclosed glass solarium on the 66th floor. The deck operated from 10 a.m. to 6 p.m. each day and charged 50 cents (Note: equivalent to $12 in 2025) for admission, although tenants and Cities Service employees received a 50% discount. It was served by a five-passenger elevator that rose through the floor slab and then retracted. The glass solarium contained doors at each of the corners, which were chamfered, as well as on the north and south sides; these doors led to one of six terraces with slate tiles. Decorations from France, Italy, and Spain adorned the observation deck. The deck charged 40 cents for admission in 1939; by comparison, the deck at the Empire State Building cost $1.10 to enter. (Note: The Cities Service Building deck's admission fee is about $9.26, while the Empire State Building deck's admission fee is about $25.46, in 2025.)

During World War II, the attraction was closed to the public because it overlooked the nearby Brooklyn Navy Yard, an active military installation. Until the 1973 construction of the World Trade Center, it was the highest observation deck of any building in Lower Manhattan. The deck was permanently closed to the public before 1975. Afterward, it was used as a private office for AIG's employees. In 2019, as part of the building's 2010s conversion into residential apartments, James Kent and Jeff Katz turned the top four stories into the fine-dining restaurant Saga. Crown Shy, a 120-seat restaurant, opened on the ground floor as well.

=== Mechanical features ===
==== Elevators ====
The building has 18 elevators, a decrease from the original 24 elevators. These were divided into six banks of four in the first-floor lobby. (Note: Abramson 2001, pp. 84–86, cites the building as having had 25 elevators, or one for every 20,000 square feet (1,900 m^{2}) of rentable space.) These originally consisted of eight double-deck elevators, which served alternating floors; six express elevators, which ran nonstop from the lobby to serve the upper floors; eight "local" elevators, which served the lower floors; and two freight elevators, which served all floors. All of the elevators were able to serve approximately 10,000 people every hour. In an emergency, it was estimated that the elevators, along with the escalators serving the lower floors, could clear the building in 35 minutes. The elevator doors in the main lobby are ornately designed, resembling those at the Fred F. French Building, 608 Fifth Avenue, and the Chrysler Building. Each elevator has a double-leaf aluminum door with diamond and trefoil patterns cast in one piece. The elevator doors in the lobbies contain octagonal relief panels sculpted by Chambellan. These reliefs alternately show a woman with an oil lamp and a man with an electric turbine. In the 2015–16 renovation, several of the elevator shafts were converted to mailrooms on the lobby floor. The central elevator bank also includes a "fake" elevator door in the same art deco design, which leads to the building's fire control room.

Because of the limited lot size of 70 Pine Street and the setbacks that further restrict the size of the upper floors, it would have been unprofitable under normal building practices if the building were taller than 48 stories. Engineers from Otis Elevator Company told Doherty that double-deck elevators could solve the problem. As such, the company manufactured eight double-deck elevators, marking the first installation of Otis double-deck elevators. The double-deck elevators operated as express elevators, serving the 29th through 60th floors; another separate, single-deck elevator served the top six floors. The lower deck of each elevator served odd-numbered floors, while the upper deck served even-numbered floors. The Cedar Street portion of the first-floor lobby provided access to elevators that served only the building's lower floors, while the Pine Street portion had elevators that served higher floors. During off-peak hours, only the upper deck of each double-deck elevator was used.

The Real Estate Record and Guide stated that the double-deck elevators, long anticipated by developers, were "permitted by special provision in the new elevator code". Compared to 11 or 14 standard elevators, the double-deck elevators reportedly saved $200,000 in construction costs (Note: About $2.868 million in 2024) and made available an additional 40,000 square feet (3,700 m^{2}) (Note: The New York Times and Trager 2003, p. 471 state that up to 40,000 square feet (3,700 m^{2}) of total space was saved. The Washington Post says 24,000 square feet (2,200 m^{2}) of rentable space was saved.) at a time when office space could be rented at an average rate of $3.50 per square foot ($37.7/m^{2}) per year. (Note: About $65.63 per square foot in 2025) Columnist Sam Love disagreed, saying that "the odds and the evens in the Cities Service Building will never see each other although they are the nearest neighbors", referring to the floor numbers. The double-deck elevators were removed in 1972 and replaced with single-story cabs. The double-deck elevators had reportedly been unpopular because the lower lobby entrance was not completed, and a proposed subway entrance was not opened. The Citigroup Center adopted the same idea in the 1970s, becoming possibly the first building in New York City after 70 Pine Street to have double-deck elevators.

==== Other features ====
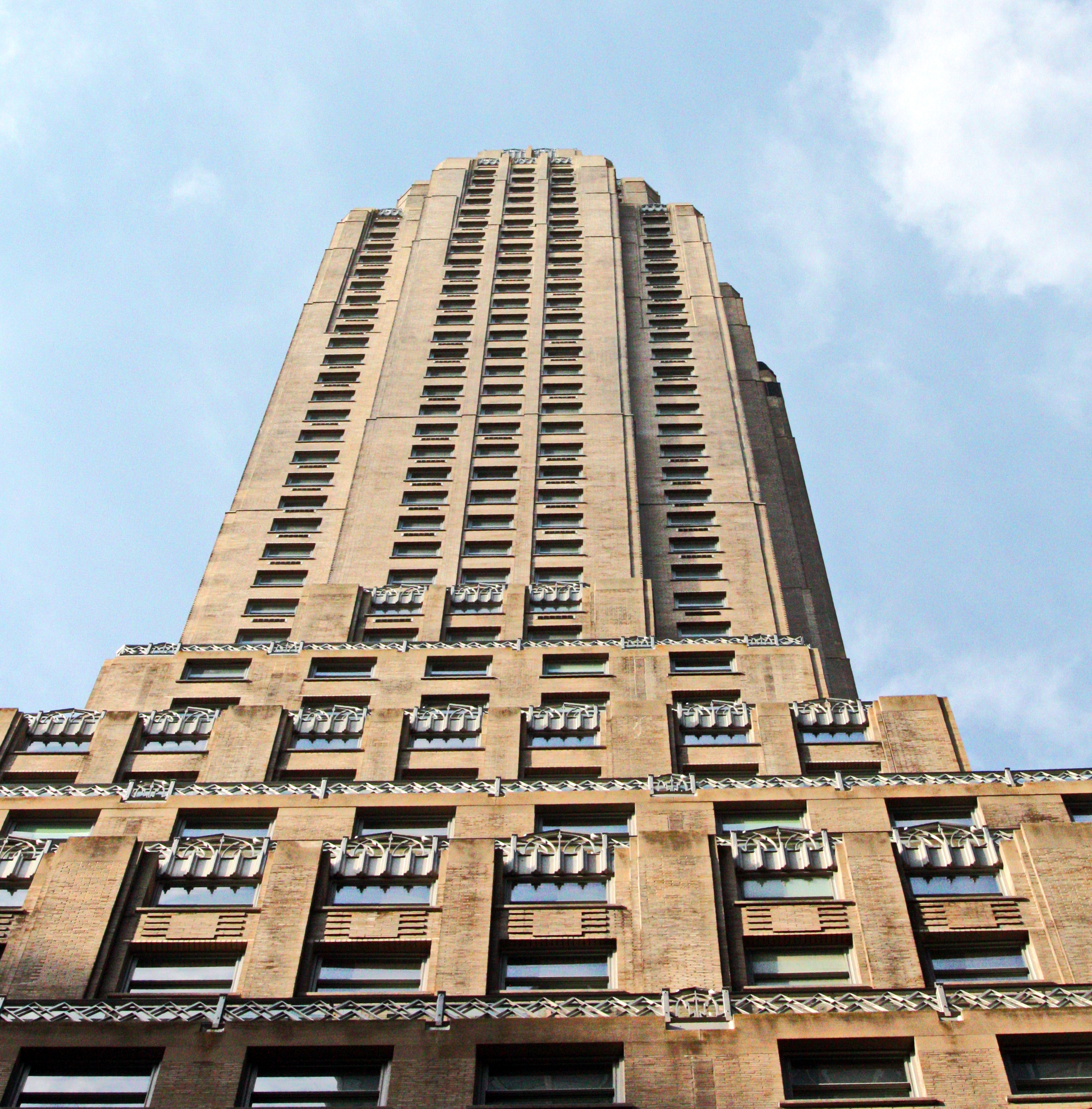
Looking up from ground level

On the 16th floor, a sky bridge connected 70 Pine Street with 60 Wall Street. There was another connection, a tunnel, between the two buildings. The connections enabled 70 Pine Street to initially claim a Wall Street address, which was perceived as more distinguished than a regular address in the Financial District. The bridge was destroyed in 1975, along the original 60 Wall Street, to make way for a larger building on that site. At the time, it was one of a few sky bridges in the city. (Note: Other nearby buildings with sky bridges included the Trinity and United States Realty Buildings and 20 Exchange Place to 55 Wall Street. These might have inspired the creation of 70 Pine's sky bridge. In addition, sky bridges existed between the Metropolitan Life Insurance Company Tower and Metropolitan Life North Building; the Fashion Institute of Technology; Gimbels department store, now Manhattan Mall, at Herald Square; the Bloomingdale's flagship at 60th Street; and Hunter College.) In 1979, a replacement bridge was built, connecting the sixth and seventh floors of 70 Pine Street to the seventh and eighth floors of 72 Wall Street. A permit to demolish that sky bridge was issued in 2014, and the demolition was completed the next year.

When it opened, 70 Pine Street featured escalators between its first through sixth floors; the escalators operated in the peak direction, running upstairs in the morning and downstairs in the afternoon. The escalators reportedly enabled everyone on the basement through the sixth floor to evacuate within 10 minutes. At the time of 70 Pine Street's completion, these stories housed Cities Service's clerical staff, and studies had shown that escalators occupied less space than elevators between these stories. This was one of the first uses of escalators in a major office building. Though the Empire State Building had also included escalators between its lobby and mezzanine, 70 Pine Street was modeled on the layout of a department store, the first office building in New York City to be designed in this manner. These escalators were hidden behind a false marble wall.

The foundation is composed of 49 piers, which are arranged in four rows and descend 24 feet (7.3 m) to the underlying bedrock. 70 Pine Street also included a hot-water heating system, which replaced the standard boiler systems used in many contemporary skyscrapers. High-velocity pumps propelled water to radiators beneath the windows in each office. Each radiator contained movable louvers that could control the heat in each office. During the winter, a system of chilled water pipes cooled the lowest six stories. The building also had a "unit ventilating system", which occupied spaces over the radiators and inside the walls, providing ventilation without any dust or noise. Above each radiator were fans, which drew in air from either indoors or outdoors, filtered and warmed the air, and distributed the warm air throughout each office using ceiling ducts. This eliminated the need for fan rooms, which typically occupied large amounts of space, and also allowed tenants to close their windows during the summer, particularly before air conditioning became popular. Cities Service installed the unit-ventilating system on the lower part of the building above the fifth floor, and tenants on the upper stories could also install the system in their own offices.

== History ==
Henry Latham Doherty had gained his wealth by leading numerous companies in the manufactured gas and electric utility sectors in the late 19th and early 20th centuries. He formed the Cities Service Company as a utility firm in 1910, and Doherty's business interests grew extensively in subsequent years. At the time, his main offices were located at 60 Wall Street (built 1905 and demolished 1975), just south of 70 Pine Street's site, which he had occupied since 1906. This structure measured 15 stories high at its front, on Wall Street, and 27 stories high at its rear, on Pine Street.

=== Development ===
==== Planning ====
Doherty, who already owned several Lower Manhattan properties, purchased 60 Wall Street in December 1924 to expand the structure. Thomas J. George of Clinton & Russell presented plans in March 1927 for a modern slab-like structure on Wall Street. That October, George modified the plans, which now called for a 60-story structure shaped like a turret. Doherty formed the Pine Street Realty Company in January 1929, having failed to develop "a great business centre" near Battery Park. Clinton & Russell were hired as architects and proposed two plans for the site: a simple slab rising from the ground and a Gothic Revival design rising 60 floors. The New York City Department of Buildings rejected these plans.

The Pine Street Realty Company then started buying land across Pine Street, acquiring twelve buildings in January 1929 to form a plot with 17,000 square feet (1,600 m^{2}). The site was in the core of the Financial District, near the Third Avenue elevated line, and was surrounded by shorter buildings. Another five plots were acquired via lease in November 1929, and the Cities Service Company was in negotiations to acquire the Down Town Association building as well. At the time, the company planned to build between 25 and 50 stories. Two more lots were leased in July 1930. In total, the Pine Street Realty Company acquired 23 lots, which all contained low-rise three- to five-story masonry buildings, at a total cost of $2 million, (Note: About $28.681 million in 2024) relatively cheap for the time. The economist W. C. Clark investigated the planned Cities Service Building's design and, in October 1929, shared his findings at the Engineers' Club. He found that taller buildings on small lots could be profitable, provided that these included double-deck elevators due to the lot's small size. As a result, the proposed Cities Service Building was most economically viable as a 63-story building.

Clinton & Russell, under the leadership of Thomas George, designed the new building in the Art Deco style. This contrasted with the firm's earlier works, which were largely designed in the classical style; the original partners died before 70 Pine Street was constructed. Doherty submitted the building's architectural plans to the Department of Buildings in May 1930. The structure was slated to have 63 stories and cost $7 million. (Note: About $104.318 million in 2024) It was one of several buildings that Doherty planned to erect in Lower Manhattan, though none of the other projects were realized because of a lack of funding following the Great Depression. After the building plans were submitted, the height was increased to 66 stories, and a spire was added, increasing the total height to 950 feet (290 m) or 952 feet (290 m). The Cities Service Building thus beat the 927-foot (283 m) 40 Wall Street to become the tallest building in Manhattan south of 34th Street. August H. Fromm oversaw the building's planning and construction.

==== Construction ====
Construction started in May 1930 and continued for 24 months. Demolition of existing buildings and site excavation began almost immediately after the building plans were submitted. The western portion of the site was the first to be cleared. Some 100,000 short tons (89,000 long tons; 91,000 t) of soil were removed from the site, which was excavated to as deep as 60 feet (18 m). The foundation took 245,000 worker-hours to complete. Work was complicated by the presence of a holdout tenant, Nik Coutroulas, a cafeteria operator who held a lease on one of the existing buildings and also operated a Lindy's franchise. Doherty's company could not reach a lease agreement with Coutroulas prior to the start of work. After Coutroulas's building was demolished, he sued Doherty for damages, eventually receiving $5,000 in compensation. (Note: About $75 thousand in 2024)

Construction was funded using a then-unconventional method: a public offering of stock. Henry L. Doherty & Co. sold $15.7 million (Note: About $233.971 million in 2024) of interest-free shares, which Cities Service described at the time as "financially unique among large New York office buildings". The company operated local branch offices in several cities, each of which had to raise a certain amount of money before October 1930. Each office had to meet a different quota: the Spokane, Washington, office had to raise $91,500, while the New York City office was required to raise $3 million. (Note: In modern terms, the Spokane office had to raise $13.636 million, while the New York City office had to raise $44.708 million in 2024.) This avoided the need for the building's owners to obtain a mortgage loan.

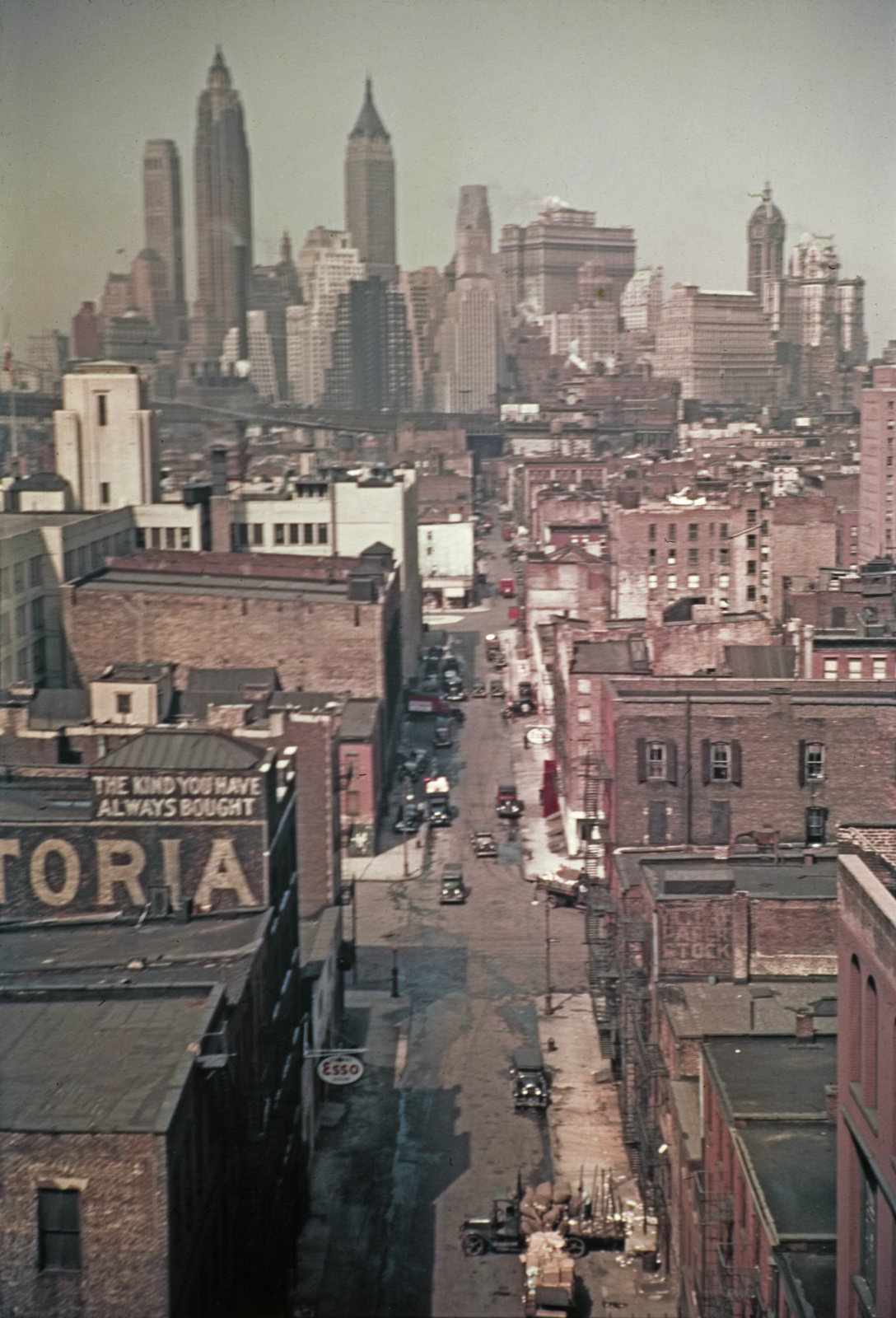
70 Pine Street (in background; second from left) in 1938

The project involved large amounts of materials, including 10 million bricks, 23.5 million pounds (10.7 kt) of cement, and 24,000 short tons (21,000 long tons; 22,000 t) of steel. The steel structure was built at an average rate of three floors per week. The New York Times reported in April 1931 that the steel had been erected to the 27th floor. By mid-1931, steel frame construction had reached the 59th floor, while the facade had been built up to the 50th floor. At the time, 70 Pine Street's construction employed 600 workers, and the structure had no official name. Workers had been on the project for 119,000 hours without any major accidents. The spire was installed in October 1931. The sky bridge between 70 Pine Street and 60 Wall Street was completed in February 1932, at which point the building at 70 Pine Street became known as the 60 Wall Tower.

=== Cities Service ownership ===
By early 1932, the 60 Wall Tower was completed. The city's Department of Buildings gave the building a temporary occupancy certificate in March 1932, followed by a permanent certificate that August. The building was dedicated on May 13, 1932, Doherty's 62nd birthday. The event celebrated Doherty's reinstatement as executive of Cities Service after he took a six-year hiatus from the position due to health problems. It included a luncheon attended by 200 businessmen; the dedication of Doherty's bronze bust; the spire's floodlighting; and a radio announcement that Doherty made from the spire. Cities Service also issued a pamphlet to advertise its new building.

Tenants had started moving into 70 Pine Street before its official dedication. Upon opening, the second through seventeenth floors were occupied by about 3,000 employees of Cities Service. The remaining floors were leased to a large range of tenants, including manufacturers, lawyers, accountants, and the Western Union Telegraph Company. At the time of the building's opening, its tenants included 31 law firms, 21 investment firms, eight insurance companies, and 18 companies in other industries. Most tenants on the upper floors were lawyers, who took advantage of the 29th-floor law library. The second and third floors were also occupied by the Emergency Unemployment Relief Committee. Additionally, more than 200 people worked for the building itself under the supervision of building manager Edgar J. Smith. These included an all-female staff of elevator operators, most of whom were redheads "recruited largely from the ranks of unemployed showgirls".

The building was reportedly two-thirds rented by 1933, but it did not reach 90 percent occupancy until 1941. Later tenants included the Federal Reserve Bank of New York, which took space in 70 Pine Street in 1941. The radio station WGYN also established its studios and transmitter at 70 Pine Street when it was founded in December 1941, and it continued to broadcast from there until May 1950. Cities Service refinanced the building with a $5.3 million, (Note: About $49.482 million in 2024) 20-year mortgage loan in March 1950.

One portion of 70 Pine Street was under separate ownership from the rest of the building and could be physically separated if necessary. The estate of aviator Cortlandt F. Bishop, which owned a 10,000-square-foot (930 m^{2}) section of the structure, leased it to a wholly owned subsidiary of the Cities Service Company, Sixty Wall Tower Inc. In June 1950, the land under the building was placed for auction by the New York Trust Company on behalf of Bishop's estate. After World War II, Cities Service downsized its Manhattan staff and leased out several lower floors. Merrill was one such tenant, leasing ten floors in a 1957 transaction and ultimately moving 3,400 of its 8,600 employees to 70 Pine Street by 1965. Though Cities Service became known as Citgo in 1965, the building retained the "Cities Service Building" name.

=== AIG ownership ===
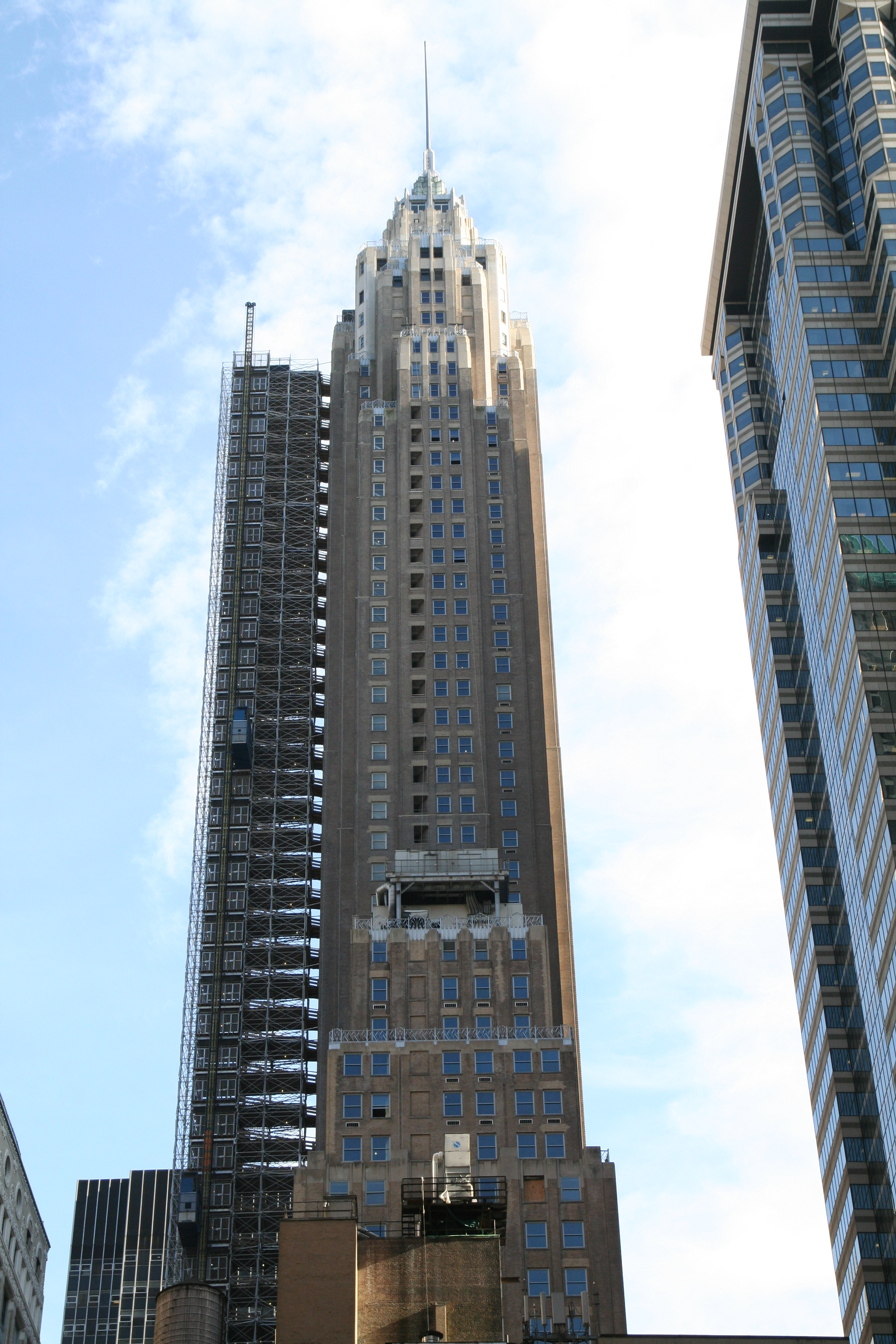
Being renovated, 2014

Citgo announced in November 1973 that it would move its executive headquarters to Tulsa, Oklahoma, and sell off 70 Pine Street and several other buildings in Manhattan. The move would affect about 250 personnel at 70 Pine Street. Citgo subsequently moved to Tulsa in 1975. The following year, the building was purchased for $15 million by the American International Group (AIG), (Note: About $64.173 million in 2024) which wanted to double the amount of space available for its 500 New York City employees. 70 Pine Street was renamed the American International Building, and AIG workers moved into the structure over the next two years. AIG occupied the lowest 26 stories and leased out 250,000 square feet (23,000 m^{2}) to other companies, such as law firms, securities firms, and brokerages.

Under AIG's ownership, the lobby was renovated, as was the observation deck, which became a private office. The sky bridge to Wall Street was demolished in 1975 when the previous building at 60 Wall Street was razed. By the 1990s, the building's tenants also included the Starr Foundation, which had been established by AIG founder Cornelius Vander Starr and paid no rent for its offices. AIG bought the nearby 175 Water Street in 1995 but kept its headquarters at 70 Pine Street. AIG refurbished the building's elevators in the late 1990s. Restoration architect HLW International used blueprints from Otis, the original elevators' manufacturer, to redesign the single-deck elevator cabs in the style of the original double-deck cabs.

70 Pine Street continued as AIG's world headquarters until the 2008 financial crisis, when the company went bankrupt and received a bailout from the U.S. government. To repay the federal government, AIG decided to sell off its assets in March 2009. AIG announced in June 2009 that it had reached an agreement to sell the building and to relocate. The building was acquired by developer Youngwoo & Associates and the Kumho Investment Bank, which spent a combined $150 million on 70 Pine Street and 72 Wall Street. This amounted to $100 per square foot ($1,100/m^{2}), about 80 percent less than what AIG could have received for the building before the 2008 financial crisis, according to Crain's New York Business.

=== Residential and hotel conversion ===
Youngwoo initially planned to renovate 70 Pine Street's upper stories into condominiums, which would be sold for $2,000 per square foot ($22,000/m^{2}). The lower floors were to be rented to office tenants for $33 to $35 per square foot ($360 to $380/m^{2}), a 25 to 30 percent decline from asking rates before the late-2000s recession. Because of an oversupply of office space in Lower Manhattan, few companies were willing to lease the 500,000 square feet (46,000 m^{2}) of vacant office space at 70 Pine Street. Furthermore, a decline in demand for luxury condominiums in Manhattan, spurred by the 2008 recession, prompted Youngwoo to cancel its condo-conversion plan. Kumho Investment Bank then hired Sciame Development to take over the project in 2011. That June, Kumho agreed to sell the building to MetroLoft Management. This prompted Sciame to sue Kumho for breach of contract.

MetroLoft finalized its acquisition in January 2012, with plans to turn 70 Pine Street into an apartment building or a combined hotel/apartment complex with about 1,000 total units. MetroLoft sold 70 Pine Street to Rose Associates later that year. Rose and DTH Capital transformed 70 Pine Street into a mixed-use building featuring luxury rental apartments and a variety of retail and restaurants starting in 2015. Leasing of the residential units started in December 2015. The renovation was completed the next year, with leasing beginning in February 2016. DTH and Rose obtained $375 million in financing from a syndicate led by Brookfield Properties in May 2017. This was replaced in 2019 with a $386 million mortgage loan from Goldman Sachs.

Unlike the top floors of other converted residential buildings, which were generally turned into penthouse apartments, Rose decided to convert the top floors of 70 Pine Street to amenity areas instead. The ground story and upper floors were originally slated to house restaurants by April Bloomfield and Ken Friedman, who withdrew from the project in mid-2016. Ultimately, James Kent and Jeff Katz's restaurant Crown Shy opened on the ground floor in 2019. Mint House opened a 132-unit hotel for business travelers inside the building in November 2020. The Overstory bar opened on the 64th floor in August 2021, and the Saga restaurant opened atop the building that month. In early 2024, DTH and Rose refinanced the building with $395 million from Goldman Sachs.

== Impact ==
The completed building received an award from the Downtown League in 1932, recognizing it as the best structure completed in the Financial District in the preceding twelve months. It attracted attention from figures such as the photographer Weegee, who, in 1946, took many photographs of the building's tenants and services. According to author Daniel Abramson, Weegee "was fascinated by this city within a city, its swift transportation, its towering height and subterranean depth, its busy thousands of tenants and visitors, and the unobtrusive, night-and-day efficiency of its service staff". The skyscraper was featured in pictures of Lower Manhattan, such as A New York Canyon, a 1932 image by W. K. Oltar-Jevsky. Other photographs, depicting seaplanes and blimps flying over 70 Pine Street, reinforced the building's association with the Jazz Age.

In 1981, architectural critic Paul Goldberger described 70 Pine Street, 1 Wall Street, and several buildings on nearby John Street as "an echo of the jazz age life". Goldberger wrote of the building's spire in 1983: "[T]he lighting is simple and elegant. A lovely translucent glass crown forms the top of the Art Deco setback spire, and at night it glows softly in the midst of the somber financial district." Another New York Times critic, James Vescovi, wrote in 2005 that the lobby was "a paradigm of Art Deco style: sunburst ceilings, filigreed radiator grilles, marble floors in black and earth tones, and elevator doors emblazoned with zigzags and Aztec-like figures." The New York City Landmarks Preservation Commission (LPC) considered designating 70 Pine Street's exterior and its first-floor interior as city landmarks in March 2011, and the building was designated as such on June 21, 2011. When 70 Pine Street became a New York City landmark, The New York Times wrote: "With its tiered glass lantern and stainless steel spire, it is an icon of the Lower Manhattan skyline."

== See also ==
- Art Deco architecture of New York City
- List of New York City Designated Landmarks in Manhattan below 14th Street
- List of tallest buildings in New York City
- List of tallest buildings in the United States
- List of tallest buildings in the world
