= George Paul Chalmers =

Scottish painter (1833–1878)

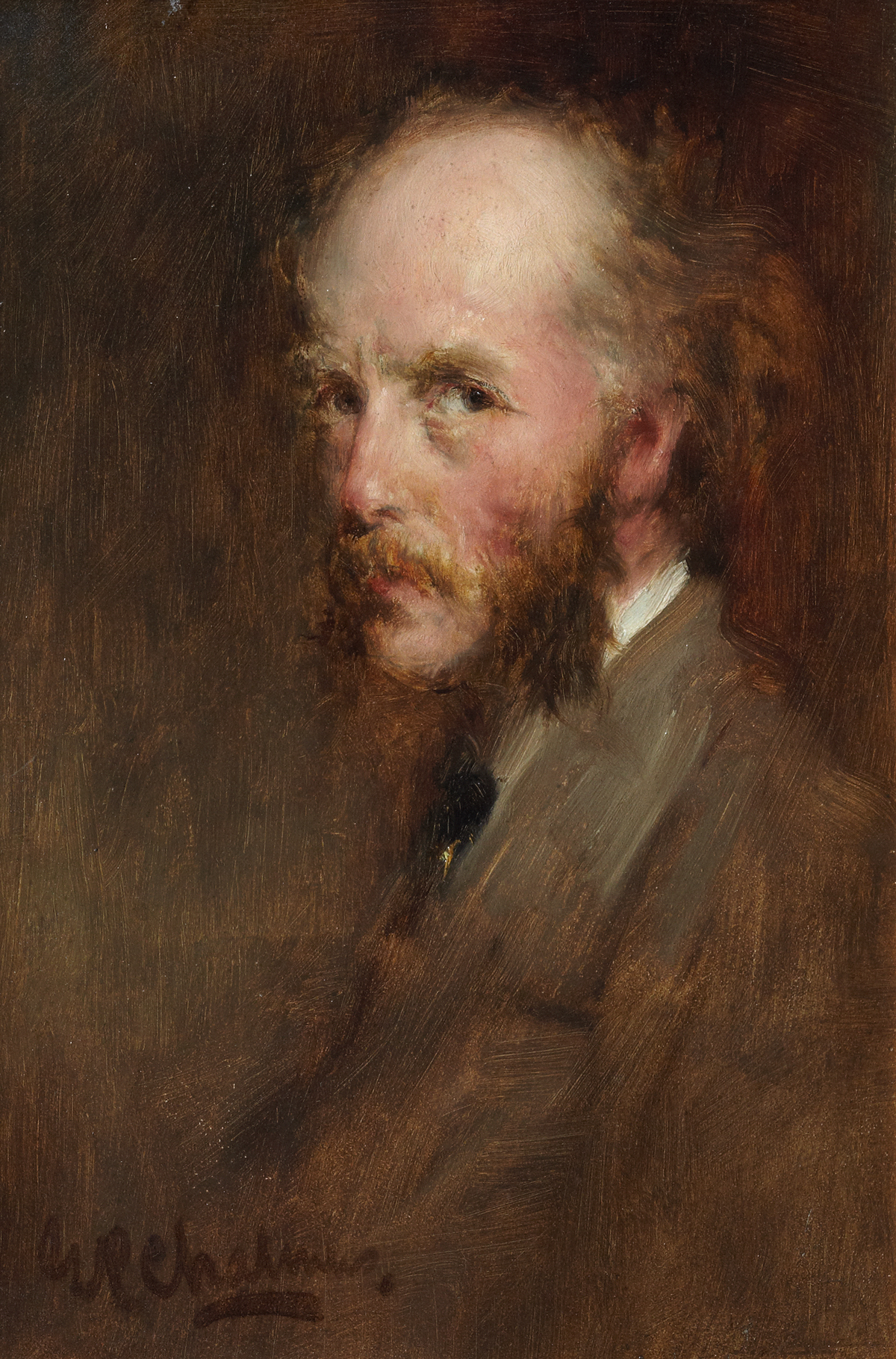
- Self-portrait
- Born: 1833; Montrose
- Died: 20 February 1878 (aged 44–45); Edinburgh
- Occupation: painter

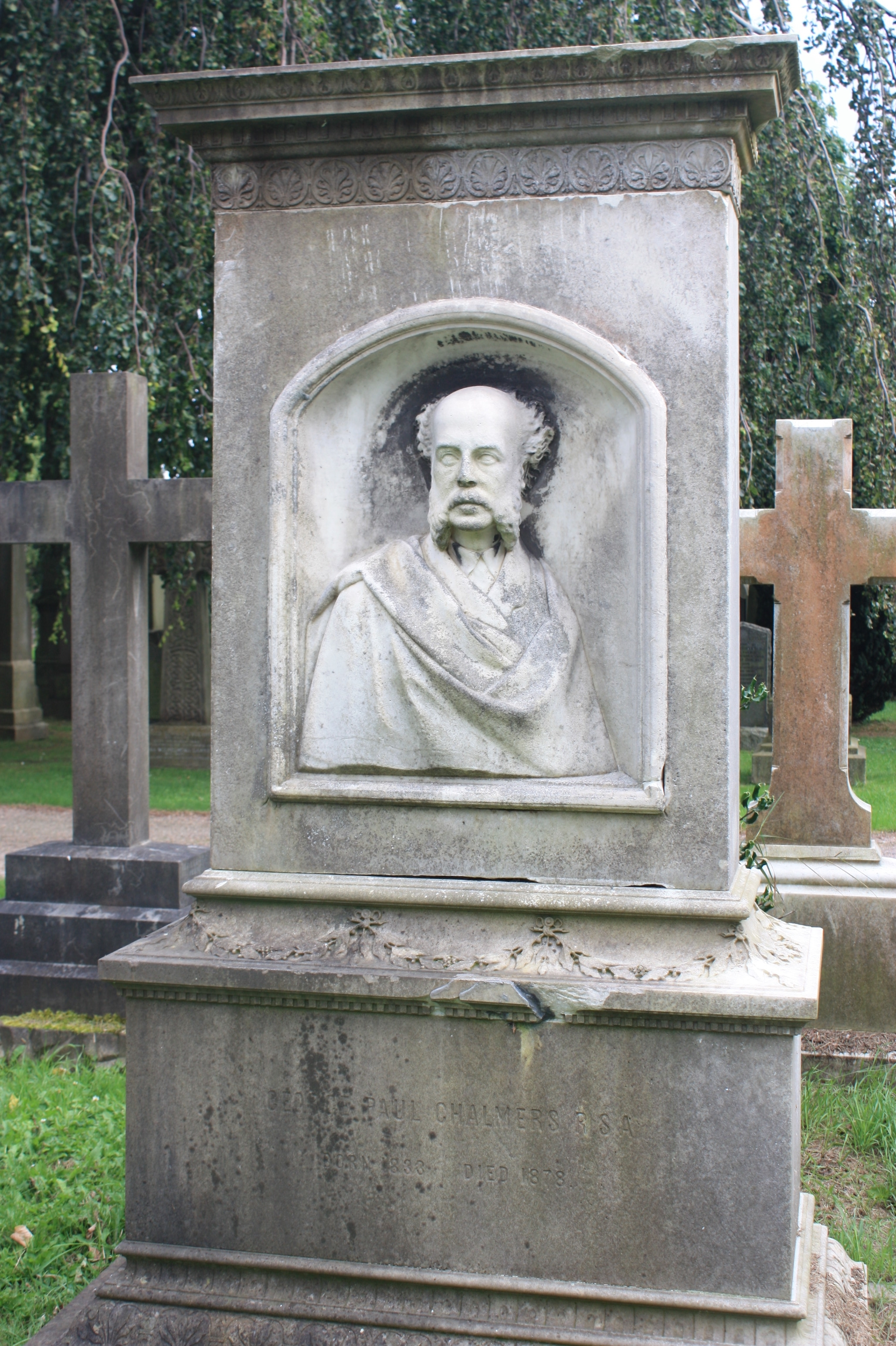
Grave of George Paul Chalmers, Dean Cemetery

George Paul Chalmers RSA (1833 – 20 February 1878) was a Scottish landscape, marine, interior and portrait painter.

== Life ==
Chalmers was born at Montrose, the son of a captain of a coastal vessel, and at the age of twenty he started to study at the Trustees Academy in Edinburgh under Robert Scott Lauder. He was nicknamed The Angus Rembrandt. He started painting portraits including those of many artists such as Jozef Israëls (1824–1911) "the most respected Dutch artist of the second half of the nineteenth century", which was painted together with Hugh Cameron, the portrait painters William McTaggart (1835–1911) and John Pettie (1839–1893); the paintings of the later two artists are in the collection of the National Galleries of Scotland. He also painted the interiors of houses and cottages like the Cranbrook Colony painters and some Dutch painters but he turned to landscapes and seascapes later in his career. The best of these are The End of the Harvest (1873), Running Water (1875), and The Legend (National Gallery of Scotland, Edinburgh). He became an associate (1867) and a full member (1871) of the Royal Scottish Academy.

His life was cut short in 1878 when he was violently mugged just off Charlotte Square in Edinburgh and died as a result of his injuries. He was by then firmly established as one of the most important Scottish artists of his period. He and his work were celebrated in a sizeable volume written and edited by Edward Pinnington, produced in collaboration with his patron, George B. Simpson. Copies of Chalmers' correspondence with Simpson from 1864 to 1873 are held in the Royal Scottish Academy's George B. Simpson Collection. He was one of the teachers to the Scottish marine painter James Campbell Noble (1846–1913).

A portrait of Chalmers by the portrait painter John Pettie hangs in the National Portrait Gallery, London. Chalmers has over 65 oil paintings in public ownership in the United Kingdom.

He is buried in Dean Cemetery in Edinburgh, just west of the city centre. The grave has a sculpted bust of Chalmers, facing the north path of the original cemetery.

== See also ==
- List of Scottish artists
