= Clover Hill (restaurant) =

Restaurant in New York City

- Interactive map of Clover Hill

Restaurant information
- Established: December 2019
- Manager: Clay Castillo
- Head chef: Sam Rogers
- Chef: Rob Kent
- Rating: (Michelin Guide)
- Location: 20 Columbia Place, Brooklyn, New York, 11201, United States
- Coordinates: 40°41′35.4″N 73°59′55.4″W
- Website: Official website

Clover Hill was a restaurant in New York City. The restaurant served American cuisine and received a Michelin star. Time Out New York rated Clover Hill 5 out of 5 stars. The restaurant closed in October 2025.

== History ==
Clover Hill originally opened in December 2019 with Stephan Ilnyckyj as its executive chef, who worked at Betony, Estela, and Eleven Madison Park. The restaurant closed in 2020 because of the COVID-19 pandemic. Then owners and partners Clay Castillo and Gabriel Merino reopened the restaurant in 2022 with executive chef Charlie Mitchell who worked at the restaurant prior to the 2020 pandemic. Clover Hill received its first Michelin star the same year that it reopened. In 2024, Clover Hill was recognized by food critic Pete Wells as number 46 out of 100 best restaurants in New York City. Wells noted the use of seasonal ingredients by then executive chef Charlie Mitchell. In early 2025, Charlie Mitchell left Clover Hill to become the executive chef of Saga. Chef Sam Rogers, who worked at Noma, Momofuku Ko, Jungsik, and Per Se, was named as its new executive chef. Clover Hill closed permanently in October 2025.

== See also ==
- List of Michelin-starred restaurants in New York City
