= James Kent (chef) =

American chef (1979–2024)

- Born: Jamal James Kent; May 2, 1979; Lower Manhattan, New York City, U.S.
- Died: June 15, 2024 (aged 45); New York, U.S.
- Education: Le Cordon Bleu, London, Paris; Johnson & Wales University
- Years active: 1993–2024
- Spouse: Kelly Kent
- Children: 2
- Culinary career
- Current restaurant(s): Saga Crown Shy

Jamal James Kent (May 2, 1979 – June 15, 2024) was an American chef. In 2010, he won the Bocuse d'Or USA. Kent and his commis Tom Allan went on to represent the U.S. at the international finals of Bocuse d'Or the following year, in Lyon, France, where they placed tenth.

== Career ==
=== Early career ===
He was trained at Le Cordon Bleu and Johnson & Wales University. Kent started his culinary career at the age of 15 as a summer apprentice at Bouley. After completing school, he worked in the New York kitchens of Babbo, Jean-Georges, and Gordon Ramsay.

=== Eleven Madison Park ===
In 2007, Kent joined Eleven Madison Park originally as a line cook but soon became sous chef too, and eventually chef de cuisine. It was during this time Eleven Madison Park went to three Michelin stars, received four stars from the New York Times, and a spot on the San Pellegrino list of the World's 50 Best Restaurants.

=== NoMad ===
Kent joined The NoMad in the fall of 2013 as executive chef. Later that year, the restaurant received its first Michelin star. He departed in 2017 to pursue his first solo project.

=== Saga and Crown Shy ===
Kent operated the restaurants Crown Shy and Saga, which are both located at 70 Pine St. in New York City. As of 2023, Crown Shy held one star from the Michelin Guide, while Saga holds two stars. He was also partner and executive chef at Overstory, a bar located one floor above Saga.

On June 7, 2024, Kent opened five new food stalls on Pacific Park's boardwalk.

== Death ==
Kent died in New York on June 15, 2024, at the age of 45. The cause of death was a heart attack.

== Awards and distinctions ==
In winning the Bocuse d'Or USA contest arranged at the Hyde Park campus of the Culinary Institute of America on February 6, 2010, Kent prepared for the fish dish Scottish "Label Rouge" salmon pavé with leeks, Osetra caviar and Sauce Fumet Blanc, garnished with roulade with Alaskan king crab, relish of cucumber and Meyer lemon, chilled mousse with tartare and roe, pickled heirloom beets with crème fraiche, dill and black pepper. For the meat dish Kent served spring lamb with bacon wrapped saddle with piquillo peppers and provençale herbes, vol-au-vent of braised gigot with sweetbreads and preserved lemon, zucchini with Lynnhaven chèvre frais and mint, tart of tomato confit with basil, niçoise olives and fromage blanc.

== Personal life ==
Kent is survived by wife, Kelly, and two children, son Gavin and daughter Avery.

His grandmother was Sue Mingus.
