= Charles Louis Mitchell =

Scottish artist (1859–1918)

Charles Louis Mitchell (26 February 1859 – 30 May 1918) was a Scottish artist who gained a local reputation as a painter of landscapes and later of portraits. He was born in Laurencekirk on 26 February 1859. His father was David Mitchell, a farmer, and his mother, Mary Ferguson. He was educated in Montrose and Aberdeen before travelling to Germany where he studied art briefly. Initially, he worked as a bank clerk before joining the Dundee Graphic Art Association in 1891. He exhibited with them till 1900 and worked from a studio at 26 Ward Road, Dundee. He was commissioned to restore a collection of 18th century portraits belonging to Lord Gardenstone. One of his portraits (c. 1891) was of George B. Simpson who was doubtless one of his patrons. He married Agnes M. Baxter at Dundee on 31 July 1900. He visited the US frequently and eventually settled in Pittsburgh where he died on 30 May 1918.
