= Artie McGovern =

American exercise instructor

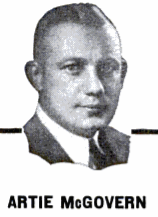
Artie McGovern

Arthur McGovern (born 1892, died 1942, at age 54) was a personal trainer to the titans of Broadway and Wall Street at his Madison Avenue gym. A former flyweight boxer, he shot to fame by reconditioning Babe Ruth after his disastrous 1925 season. Jack Dempsey, Gene Sarazen, John Philip Sousa and Paul Whiteman were among his other celebrity clients.

In December, 1925, Babe Ruth started working out at McGovern's gymnasium. He put Ruth on a rigorous program of diet, exercise and arid rest. There are photographs of McGovern working with Ruth in the August 1926 issue of the Physical Culture magazine, titled, "Brought Back By Physical Culture". McGovern has been described as a "prominent practitioner" of physical culture. Ruth came out of his 1925 slump to hit 47 home runs in 1926, and a record 60 homers in 1927.

McGovern was also the author of a 1935 fitness book title The Secret of Keeping Fit. He died in Manhattan, New York.
