= Jônt (restaurant) =

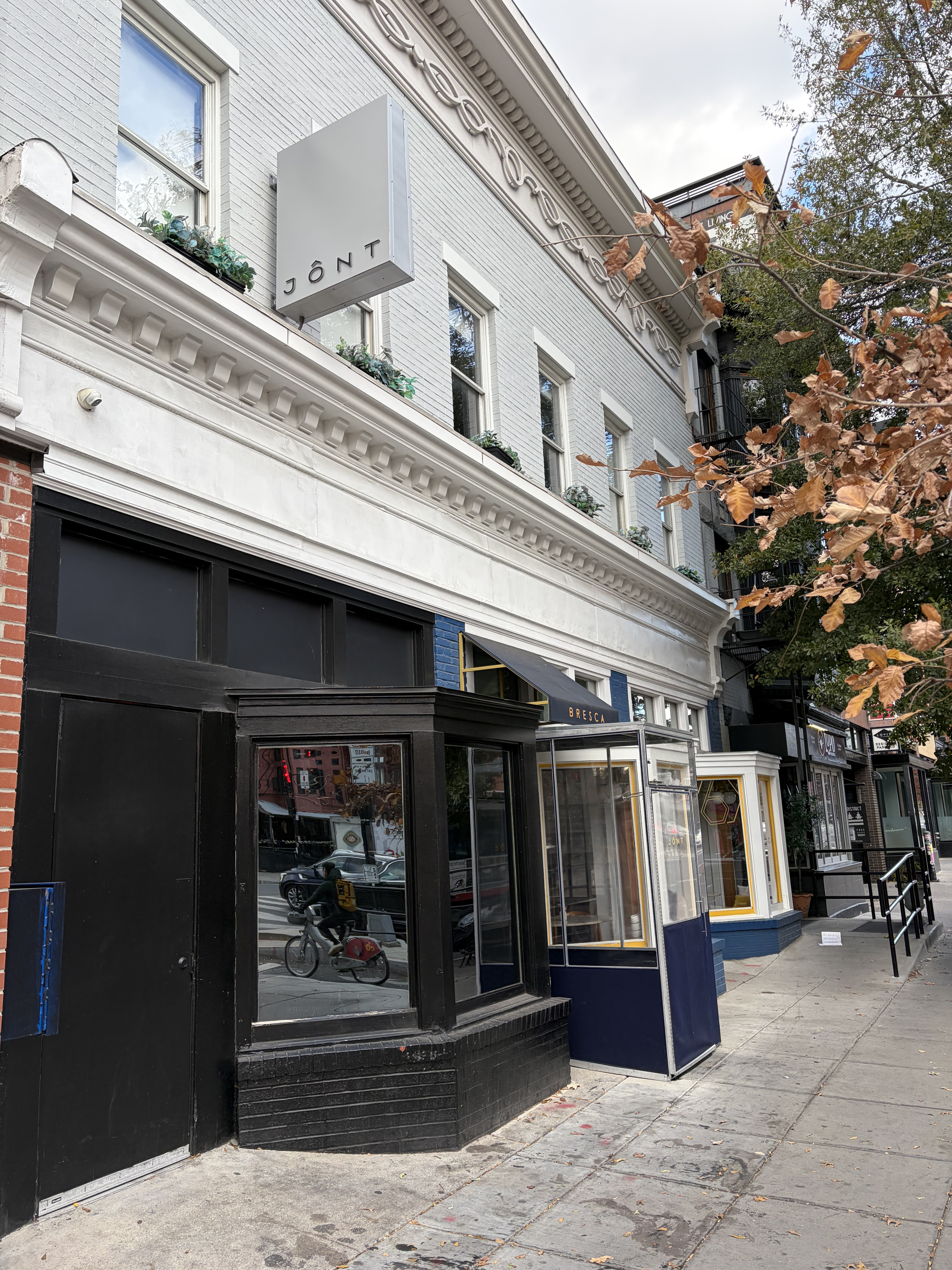
- The restaurant's exterior in November 2025
- Interactive map of Jônt

Restaurant information
- Established: 2020
- Owner: Ryan Ratino
- Head chef: Ryan Ratino
- Dress code: Casual
- Rating: (Michelin Guide)
- Location: 1904 14th Street NW, Washington, D.C., 20009, United States
- Coordinates: 38°54′57″N 77°1′56″W
- Reservations: Suggested
- Website: jontdc.com

Jônt is a restaurant in Washington, D.C., in the United States. Operated by chef Ryan Ratino, the restaurant was established in 2020 and has received two Michelin stars. The interior has a 14-seat counter. The menu has included live scallop, Dungeness crab with koshiibuki rice, and dry-aged duck.

== See also ==
- List of Michelin-starred restaurants in Washington, D.C.
