= Crown Shy =

Restaurant in New York City

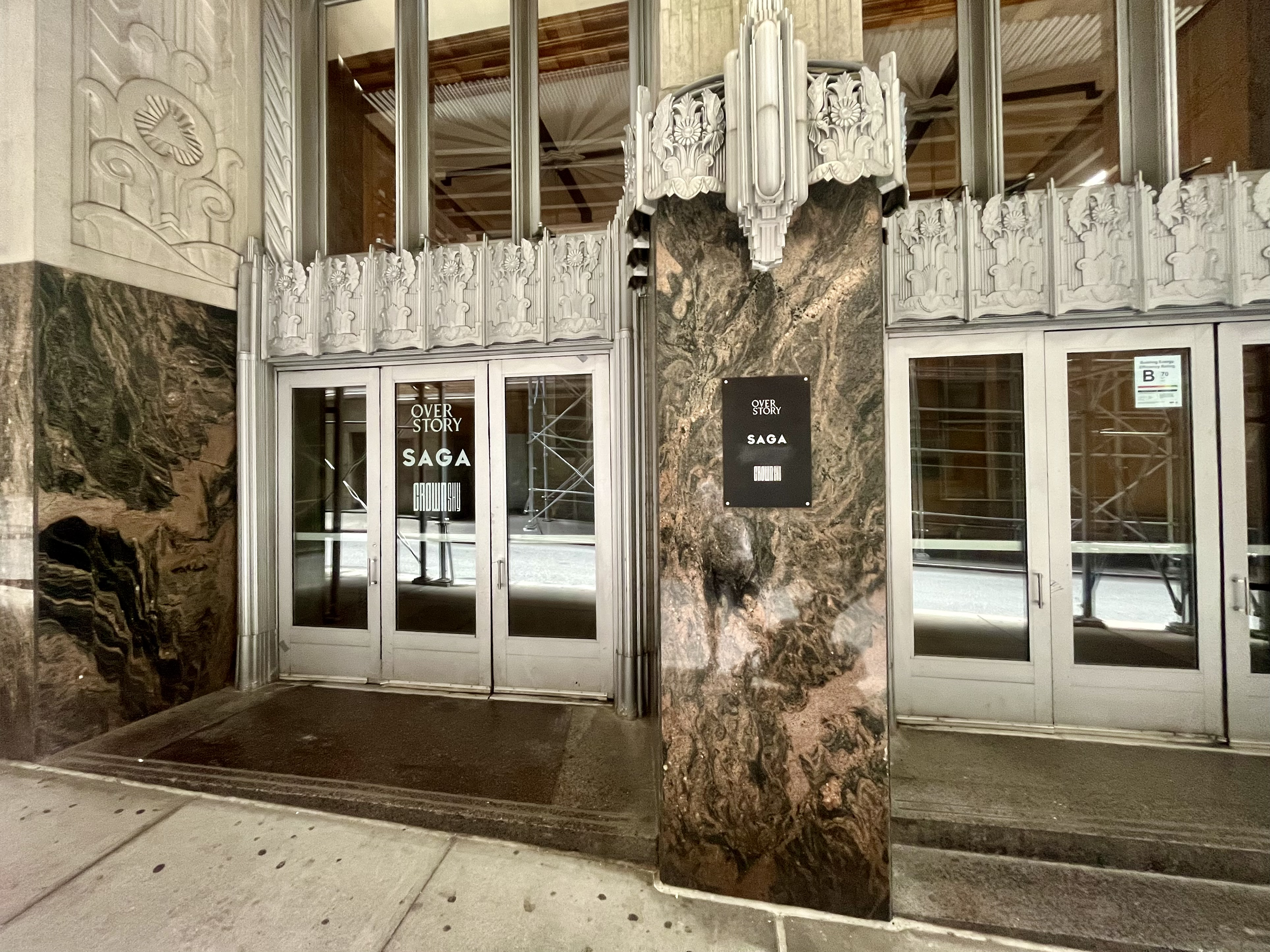
- The entrance to the restaurant at the exterior of 70 Pine Street in 2024
- Interactive map of Crown Shy

Restaurant information
- Established: March 2019
- Food type: American
- Rating: (Michelin Guide)
- Location: 70 Pine Street, New York City, New York, 10005, United States
- Coordinates: 40°42′23″N 74°0′28″W
- Website: www.crownshy.nyc

Crown Shy is a restaurant in New York City, New York in the Financial District. It is located on the ground floor of 70 Pine Street and is associated with Saga; a 2 star Michelin Star restaurant on the 63rd floor; and OverStory, a cocktail bar on the 64th floor which was ranked as the third best bar in the world and the second best in the United States behind Double Chicken Please on The World's 50 Best Bars in 2023. The restaurant serves American cuisine and has received a Michelin star.

== See also ==
- List of Michelin-starred restaurants in New York City
