= Charlie Mitchell (American football) =

American football player (1920–1999)

No. 37, 16
- Positions: Defensive back, guard

Personal information
- Born: December 28, 1920; Oilton, Oklahoma, U.S.
- Died: 2 April 1999 (aged 78)
- Listed height: 6 ft 0 in (1.83 m)
- Listed weight: 188 lb (85 kg)

Career information
- High school: Neosho (MO)
- College: Missouri; Tulsa
- NFL draft: 1944: 28th round, 293rd overall pick

Career history
- Chicago Bears (1945); Green Bay Packers (1946)

Career NFL statistics
- Games played: 10
- Games started: 1
- Interceptions: 1
- Stats at Pro Football Reference

Charles Everett Mitchell Jr. (December 28, 1920 – April 2, 1999) was a defensive back in the National Football League (NFL). He was drafted in the twenty-eighth round of the 1944 NFL draft by the Chicago Bears and later played with the team during the 1945 NFL season. The following season, he played with the Green Bay Packers.
