= Charlie Mitchell (baseball) =

American baseball player (born 1962)

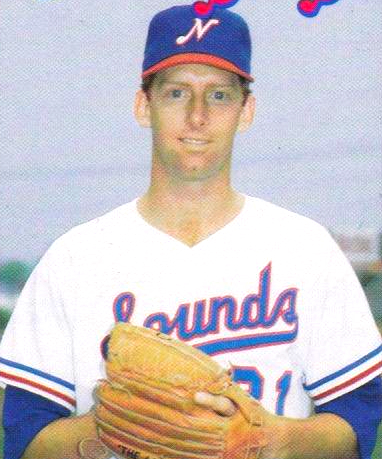
- Mitchell with the Nashville Sounds in 1988
- Pitcher
- Born: June 24, 1962 (age 62); Dickson, Tennessee, U.S.
- Batted: Right Threw: Right

MLB debut
- August 9, 1984, for the Boston Red Sox

Last MLB appearance
- September 10, 1985, for the Boston Red Sox

MLB statistics
- Win–loss record: 0–0
- Earned run average: 4.00
- Strikeouts: 9

Teams
- Boston Red Sox (1984–1985)

Charles Ross Mitchell (born June 24, 1962) is an American former Major League Baseball pitcher who played for the Boston Red Sox. He was drafted by the Red Sox in the fourth round of the 1982 amateur draft. Mitchell played his first professional season with the Elmira Pioneers in 1982 and his last with the Nashville Sounds in 1991.

Mitchell is the brother of fellow former major league pitcher John Mitchell.
