= Sam Bough =

English-born landscape painter

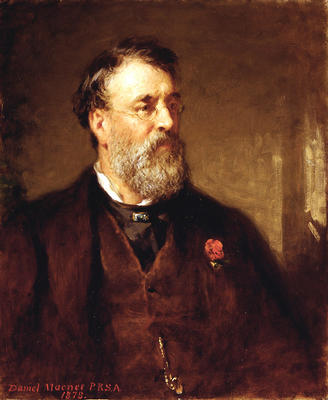
Sam Bough - 1878 by Daniel Macnee

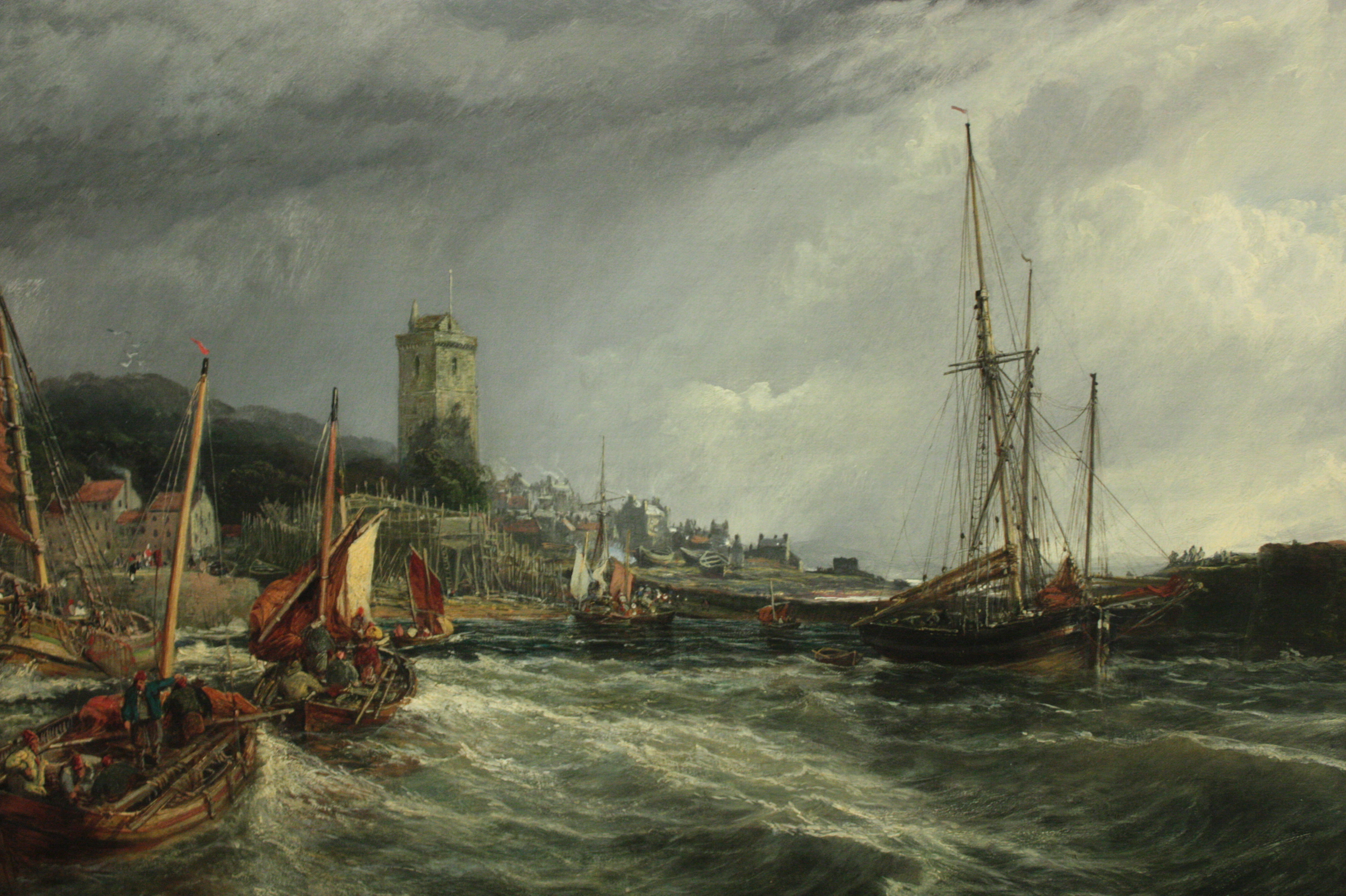
Dysart Harbour in 1854 by Sam Bough RSA, National Gallery of Scotland

Samuel Bough RSA (8 January 1822 – 19 November 1878) was an English-born landscape painter who spent much of his career working in Scotland.

== Life ==
He was born the third of five children in Abbey Street, Carlisle in northern England, the son of James Bough (1794-1845), a shoemaker, and Lucy Walker, a cook. He was raised in relative poverty, but with a keen encouragement in the arts.

He was self-taught but mixed with local artists such as Richard Harrington and George Sheffield, and was strongly influenced by the work of J. M. W. Turner. After an unsuccessful attempt to live as an artist in Carlisle he obtained a job and as a theatre scenery painter in Manchester in 1845, later also working in Glasgow in the same role. Encouraged by Daniel Macnee to take up landscape painting he moved to Hamilton from 1851-4 and worked there with Alexander Fraser. In Cadzow Forest (1857, Bourne Fine Art), influenced by Horatio McCulloch, is a 'magnificent' portrait of two ancient trees. In 1854 he moved to Port Glasgow to work on his technique of painting ships and harbours. He also began supplementing his income by illustrating books, before moving to Edinburgh in 1855.

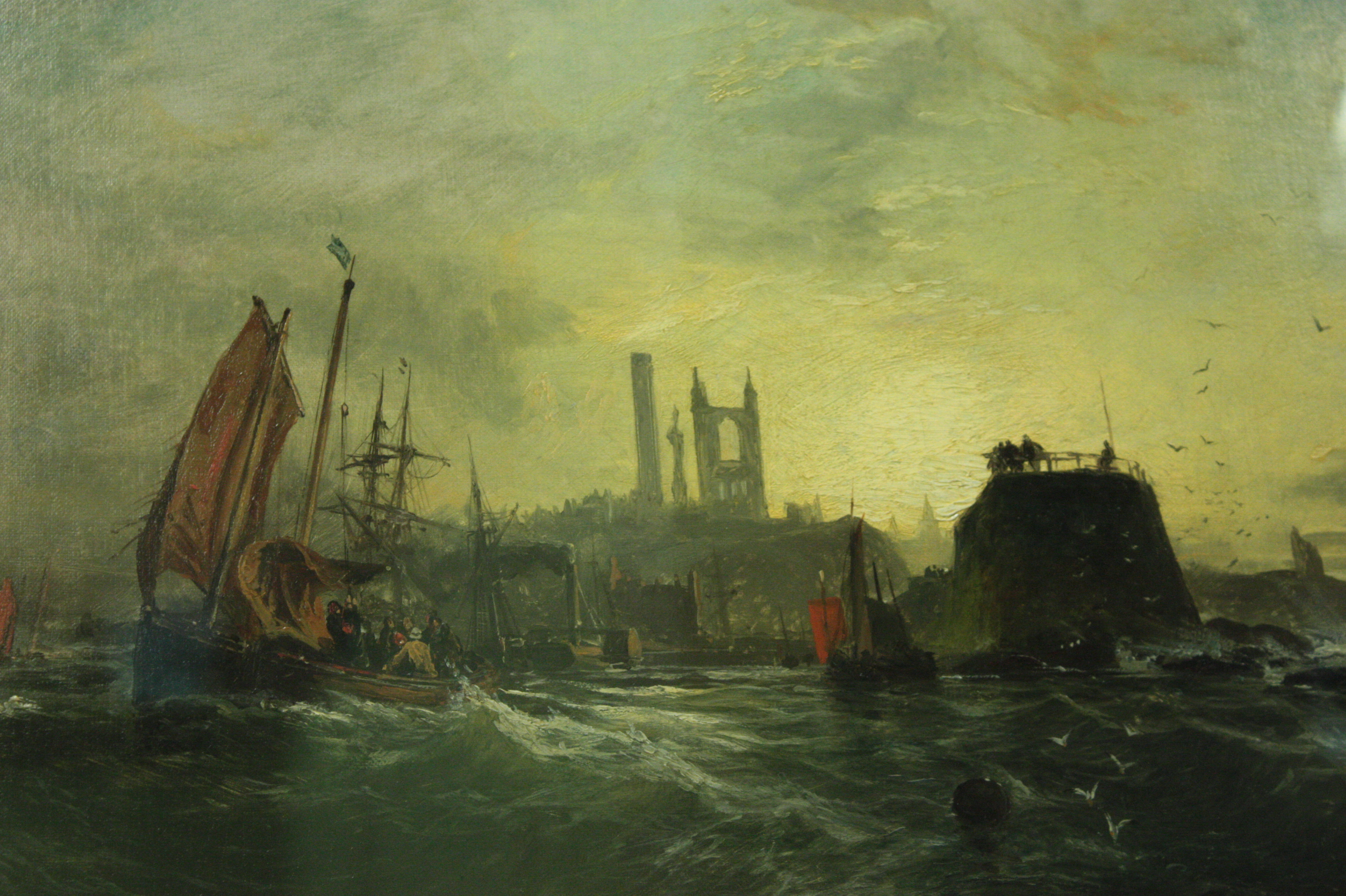
Off St Andrews by Sam Bough (1856, oil on canvas), National Galleries of Scotland

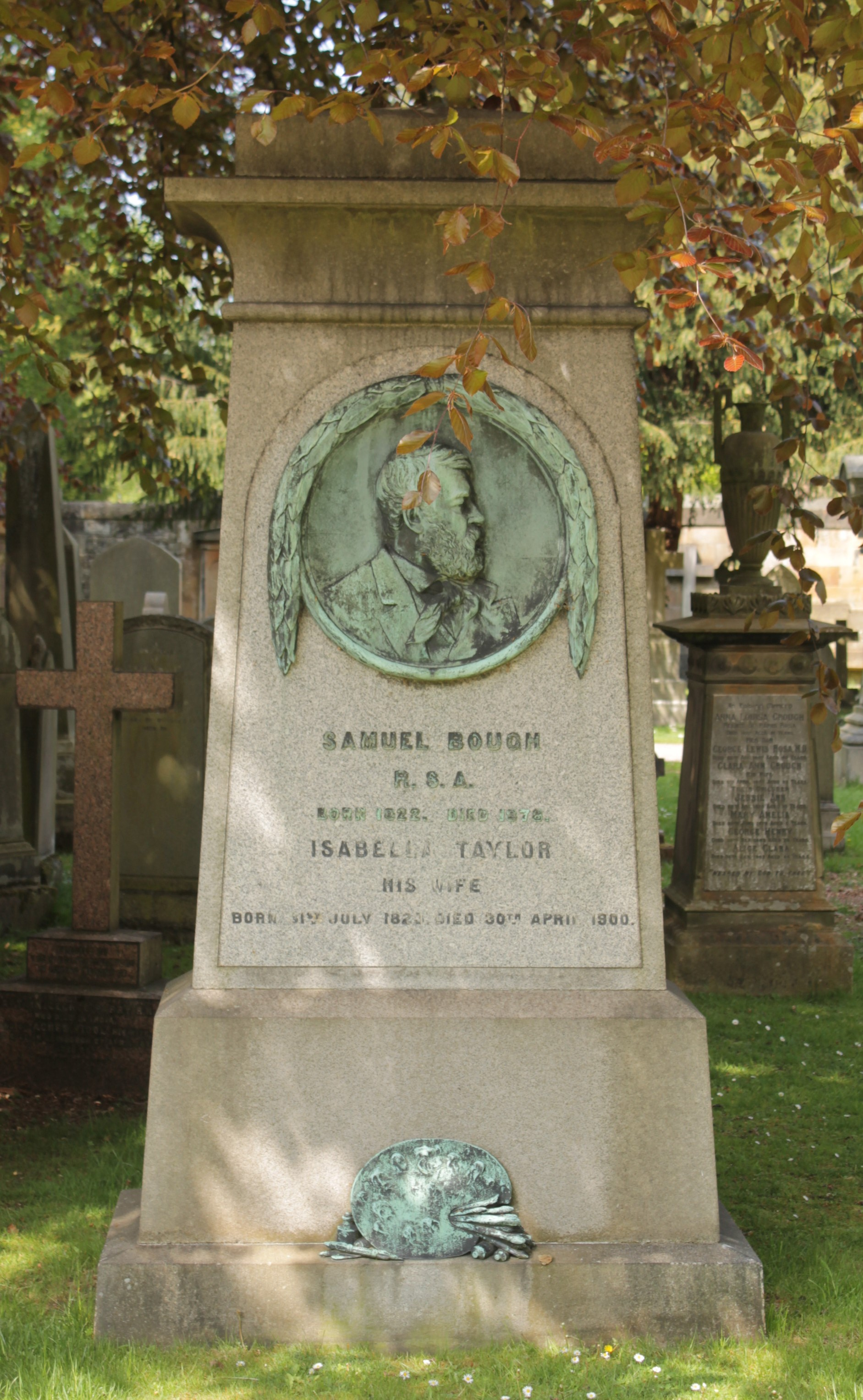
The grave of Sam Bough, Dean Cemetery

On coming to Edinburgh he lived in a terraced house at 5 Malta Terrace in the Stockbridge area of the city. Following Turner's example, he became a skillful painter of seaports. Examples include St. Andrews (Noble Grossart) and The Dreadnought from Greenwich Stairs: Sun Sinking into Vapour (1861, private collection).

He later fell out with McCulloch (their dogs apparently taking sides in the dispute). He was admired by Robert Louis Stevenson and painted a view of his house at Swanston, and the construction of Dubh Artach lighthouse. The engineering work for the latter was undertaken by the brothers Thomas and David Stevenson, Robert Louis' father and uncle respectively.

His health began to fail in 1877 and in January 1878 he suffered a stroke. He died of prostate cancer at his later home, Jordan Bank Villa in Morningside, on the south side of the city. R. L. Stevenson penned a glowing obituary of Bough.

He was buried in Dean Cemetery Edinburgh on 23 November 1878. The grave bears a bronze medallion of his head by William Brodie and faces over a southern path to the south terrace.

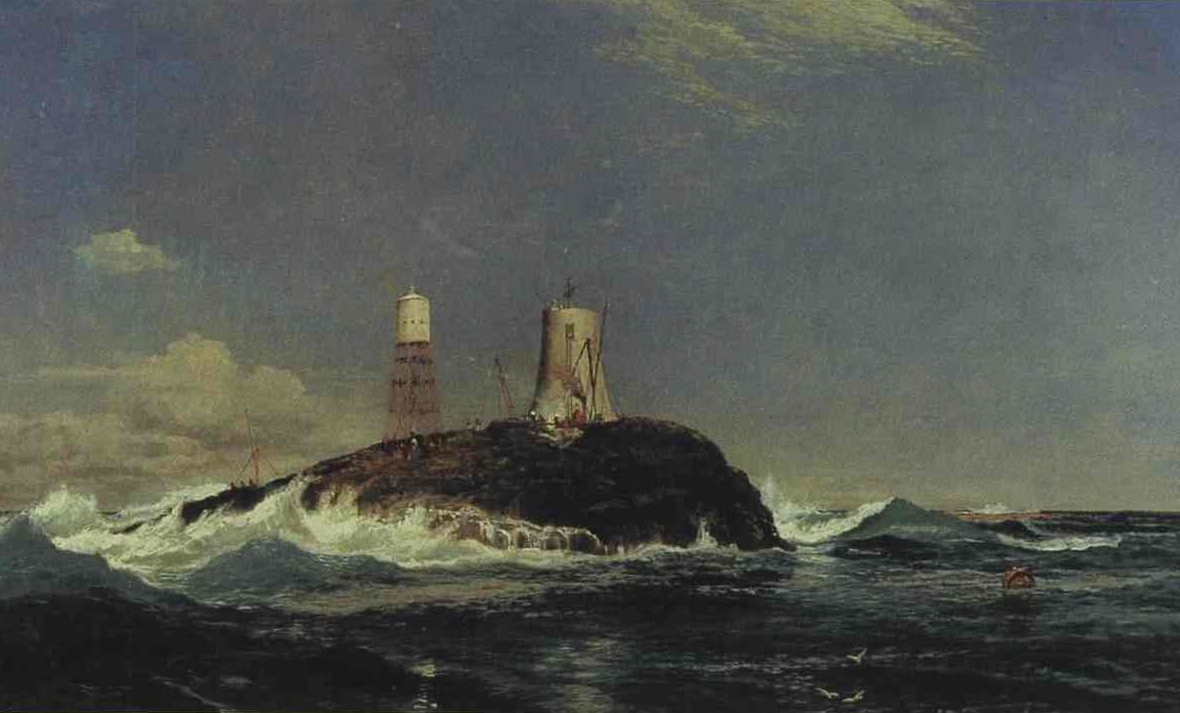
Dhu Heartach Lighthouse, During Construction by Sam Bough
