= Society of Eight =

Scottish art exhibiting society

- Formation: 1912
- Founded at: Edinburgh
- Dissolved: 1939
- Purpose: Artist Group
- Headquarters: 12 Shandwick Place
- Location: Edinburgh, Scotland
- Services: Exhibition Galleries
- Fields: Arts
- Members: Maximum of 8 artists

The Society of Eight was an artistic grouping of Scottish painters. The Society set up its own gallery space in Edinburgh to exhibit their work. It was founded in 1912 and last exhibited in 1938. The Society did not reform after the Second World War.

== Purpose ==
The aim of the society was to help bridge the artistic divide between Glasgow and Edinburgh. Despite, for example, the Glasgow School of Art having an international reputation and producing a multitude of famous artists, the Royal Scottish Academy seemed to rather cater to Edinburgh and the east coast of Scotland instead. As an illustration of this: a glance at the RSA's Guthrie Award winners through the years shows surprisingly very few Glasgow and west coast based winners in their list, the vast majority being Edinburgh and east coast based winners.

The Glasgow and the western artists founded their own institutes to promote their work instead, like the Glasgow Institute - which later was bestowed its own Royal title, as the Royal Glasgow Institute of the Fine Arts - and the Paisley Art Institute; and created further organisations like the Glasgow Society of Lady Artists, the Glasgow Society of Painters and Sculptors, and the Glasgow Art Club.

The Society of Eight attempted to bring everyone together by having its own exhibition space for the grouping of Glasgow and Edinburgh painters involved. By keeping the membership limited to Eight and selected others invited before offering membership, it aimed to produce a higher standard of exhibition than the general exhibitions of the R.S.A. and R.G.I.

== Membership ==
The Society of Eight had a fixed limited membership. A new artist could only be elected to the Eight, when one of the existing members left the Society, resigned their membership or died.

The membership cost was 7 pounds and 5 shillings per year. That membership entitled the artist to show around twenty paintings in their exhibition gallery at 12 Shandwick Place, Edinburgh.

=== Entrance to the exhibition ===
In 1915 the Society of Eight raised £75 for the Belgian Relief Fund from its entrance fees to the exhibition. That sum was provided by the organisation's secretary C. E. Stewart, a writer to the signet. During the First World War, entrance to the exhibition was free to soldiers, sailors and nurses in uniform. The standard cost for entry was 1 shilling, but a season ticket for repeat entries that year was 3 shillings. In 1917, entry was 1 shillings and 3 pence, but a proportion of that went to charity for the war effort. The Society of Eight raised over £164 for the Edinburgh Red Cross Fund that year.

Despite inflation, prices for entry went down as the exhibition became more popular. By the last exhibition of 1938, entry was charged at 6 pence.

== Founder members ==
The original members of the Society of Eight were:

Name	Born	Associated with	Left Society
Patrick Adam	Edinburgh	Edinburgh	died 1929
David Alison	Dysart, Fife	Edinburgh	lapsed 1935, re-admitted 1937
James Paterson	Blantyre	Glasgow	died 1932
James Cadenhead	Aberdeen	Edinburgh	died 1927
John Lavery	Belfast, Northern Ireland	Glasgow	
Harrington Mann	Glasgow	Glasgow	lapsed 1916, died 1937
Francis Cadell	Edinburgh	Edinburgh	died 1937
Alexander Garden Sinclair	Kenmore, Perthshire	Edinburgh	resigned 1928, died 1930

== First exhibition ==
From the Edinburgh Evening News of Wednesday 13 November 1912:

EDINBURGH. A new enterprise in art exhibitions, so far as Edinburgh is concerned, is to be inaugurated tomorrow in the New Gallery, 12 Shandwick Place. Eight artists have associated themselves as 'The Society of Eight' and they have taken a lease of these galleries, in which they propose holding at periodic intervals exhibitions free from the trammels that generally are connected with large societies. They can decorate the place in their united wisdom and they have done it exceedingly well, while the pictures are grouped so that each artist's work can be examined by itself, a condition which enhances the individual value, and does not detract from the general effect.

== Newer members ==
As the original members began to die off or resigned, newer members were invited to exhibit in the Society. William York Macgregor was the first of the newer members, replacing Harrington Mann whose membership lapsed in 1916. Unfortunately Macgregor himself did not last long as a member.

Samuel Peploe formally joined in 1926, after the death of William York Macgregor in 1923. He first was an invited guest at the Society of Eight in 1915, 11 years before.

This replacement was not without criticism at the time. The Aberdeen Press and Journal of Friday 8 January 1926 stating:

We must here express the regret that the place in the Eight of the late W. Y. Macgregor should have been filled by Mr Peploe. This artist's work is an unhappy mean between that of Messrs Sinclair and Cadell. While a better draughtsman than Sinclair and less of a revolutionary than Cadell, he has neither the purity atmospheric fidelity of the one nor the vivid power to arrest of the other.

The Dundee Courier of Friday 8 January 1926 described the new appointment more guardedly:

Mr S. J. Peploe, A.R.S.A., new entrant to the Society, and his five pictures claim the more attention. Also very advanced in his method, it may be that he is actually ahead of popular understanding, which catches up but slowly. There is brilliant work in his sea pieces, but their crowded foregrounds seem to give one no alighting place. We seek for something which ought to be there, and wonder if have missed it—or the painter. We come away with a sense of restlessness.

Henry John Lintott was elected a member in 1928 on the death of James Cadenhead.

Alexander Garden Sinclair failed to exhibit any works in the 1928 exhibition, and resigned before the 1929 exhibition. In his place John Duncan was elected a member. Duncan's work was first seen in the Society of Eight's exhibition of 1915 as loaned artwork.

This change was greeted positively. The Scotsman of Tuesday 8 January 1929 stated:

The place left vacant by the resignation of that refined and personal landscape painter, Mr A. G. Sinclair, who had been a member for many years, has been filled by the election of Mr. John Duncan. This change, if weakening the Society on the landscape side, has strengthened it on the figure side. Mr Duncan's idiosyncratic art also introduces a new note, and helps to give further variety to an exhibition in which personality has invariably been in evidence .

Patrick William Adam died at the end of 1929. He had already provided his paintings for the 1930 Society exhibition. Adam was replaced by William George Gillies as a member for the 1932 exhibition.

David Alison let his membership lapse, so for the 1935 exhibition the two obvious candidates of Archibald McGlashan and William MacTaggart were elected as members of the Society of Eight. The Society was back to full numbers, but unfortunately it did not last. Samuel Peploe died in 1935 and John Duncan resigned his membership. The 1936 Society exhibition was run with 6 members:- Francis Cadell, W. G. Gillies, John Lavery, Henry John Lintott, Archibald McGlashan and William MacTaggart.

The gesture of inviting David Alison into the 1936 exhibition, made him re-consider his membership and the Society of Eight were now up to 7 members for the 1937 exhibition. Francis Cadell's death in 1937 saw the number of members fall to 6 for the 1938 exhibition.

Name	Born	Associated with	Elected ᵜ	Left Society
William York Macgregor	Finnart House, Garelochhead	Glasgow	1919	died 1923
Samuel Peploe	Edinburgh	Edinburgh	1926	died 1935
Henry John Lintott	Brighton, England	Edinburgh	1928	
John Duncan	Dundee	Edinburgh	1929	resigned 1935
William George Gillies	Haddington, East Lothian	Edinburgh	1932	
William MacTaggart	Loanhead, Midlothian	Edinburgh	1935	
Archibald McGlashan	Paisley	Glasgow	1935	

ᵜ Shows year first exhibited as a member of the Society of Eight

== Guest exhibitors ==
Usually the exhibition admitted one invitee each year as a guest, though that number could increase if a member fell short filling their allocation in the annual exhibition. To be an invited guest indicated that the Society of Eight favoured their work; and often an invitee would be later asked to become a member when a vacancy arose in the Society.

James Guthrie - associated with the Glasgow School - was a guest exhibitor with the Society in 1912. Edward Arthur Walton - associated with the Glasgow School - was a guest exhibitor with the Society in 1913.

Paintings from James McNeill Whistler were loaned to the exhibition in 1914. Other loaned works were those of William Nicholson, William Orpen, Édouard Manet, Frank Brangwyn, Philip Connard, William McTaggart, the Edinburgh artist James Pryde, the Valenican artist Joaquín Sorolla and the Danish artist Vilhelm Hammershøi. The loaned pieces were from J. J. Cowan of Murrayfield, Edinburgh; Alexander Maitland; M. L. P. Jardine; John Kirkhope and P. J. Ford.

Samuel Peploe and Henry John Lintott were guest exhibitors in 1915. Loaned pictures saw the artists William McTaggart, James Lawton Wingate, John Duncan and Edward Arthur Walton represented.

The Society of Eight exhibition of 1916 ran with 7 painters, as Harrington Mann was absent from the exhibition.

Their 6th exhibition at the end of 1917 and start of 1918 saw invited painters Alexander Ignatius Roche, William York Macgregor, James Whitelaw Hamilton and the sculptor James Pittendrigh Macgillivray.

In 1919 William York Macgregor formally replaced Harrington Mann as a member of the Society of Eight. Invited artists were Samuel Peploe, Walter Grieve and the Edinburgh College of Art sculptor Percy Portsmouth.

By 1921 Harrington Mann was an invited artist of the Society he helped found. Others invited that year were Samuel Peploe, Thomas Corsan Morton and Percy Portsmouth.

The 1922 invites were James Lawton Wingate and sculptor James Pittendrigh Macgillivray.

The death of William York Macgregor in 1923 was not yet filled by the Society but it increased the space for invitees in the exhibition. Invited works of 1924 included that of Walter Sickert, James Lawton Wingate, Thomas Corsan Morton and the Scottish sculptors James Pittendrigh Macgillivray, Alexander Carrick, Benno Schotz, Phyllis Bone and Kate Campbell Muirhead. Macgregor's space was not filled in 1925; invited artists were Paul Gauguin with his Vision After the Sermon, Roland Strasser, the Edinburgh College of Art principal Gerald Moira, and the sculptor Alice Meredith Williams.

In 1926 with Samuel Peploe formally becoming a member, space for invites was limited though William Macdonald and William Crozier were invited.

In 1927 William MacTaggart was an invitee to the Society exhibition.

There was 4 invitees to the 1928 exhibition, due to Alexander Garden Sinclair not providing works to this year's exhibition. These were: David Foggie, George Leslie Hunter, Robert Gemmell Hutchison and Hamish Constable Paterson - the son of original member James Paterson.

On the death of Patrick Adam in late 1929, the 1931 exhibition ran with only 7 members. There were invited works from William MacTaggart, Adam Bruce Thomson, David Foggie and the late William Crozier. The 1932 exhibition saw invitees Michael de Torby, Hamish Constable Paterson and work by the late member Alexander Garden Sinclair.

On the death of James Paterson in 1932, the 1933 exhibition ran with only 7 members. William MacTaggart and Archibald McGlashan were the invitees. The 1934 exhibition still had 7 Society members; the invitees were:- Hubert Wellington, Robert Sivell, John McLauchlan Milne and Archibald McGlashan.

The 1936 exhibition only had 6 members so invites went to former member David Alison, Duncan Grant, Robert Gemmell Hutchison, Robert Sivell, John Henry Lorimer and Audrey Lintott. The exhibition also held works by Samuel Peploe as a memorial.

Audrey Lintott was an invitee to the 1937 exhibition. Invites to this exhibition were limited, as it was deemed a Silver Jubilee exhibition marking 25 years of the Society of Eight. It instead highlighted works of all its past members.

Francis Cadell died in 1937. The Society of Eight once again became 6 elected members for the 1938 exhibition. The exhibition showed a number of Cadell paintings as a memorial; and once again extended invites to artists to exhibit in their gallery. Once again, after his 1936 invite, an invite went to Duncan Grant from Rothiemurchus, Aviemore - and a now regular invite went to Audrey Lintott. Other invitees were:- John Maxwell, Hugh Adam Crawford and John Nash from London, England.

== Last exhibition ==
The Society of Eight's last exhibition was in 1938. Francis Cadell had recently died and his paintings were included in the exhibition.

From the Edinburgh Evening News of Friday 14 January 1938:

STYLISH PAINTERS SOCIETY OF EIGHT EXHIBITION LATE F. C. B. CADELL’S WORKS The 26th exhibition of the Society of Eight, which will open to the public to-morrow, is, as usual, a colourful and interesting show, though actually only six living members are exhibiting. The heavy loss sustained by the society in the death of Mr F. C. B. Cadell will not be fully apparent until next year, since a fine collection of his works is on view in the present exhibition. For the rest, Messrs David Allison, W. G. Gillies, Sir John Lavery, H. J. Lintott, Archibald A. McGlashan, and William MacTaggart fully maintain the high standard of this society of competent and stylish painters. Mr Gillies leads off with a dozen works, in which he revels in the joy of flowing rhythms and daring colour. A particularly happy colour arrangement is “Autumn Moon,” in which touches of green are beautifully placed in relation to a scheme of reds and warm greys. His “West Ross-shire” may be a little too vigorous for some tastes, but contains some very interesting linear rhythms, and there is a fine quality of fluid paint in “Loch Tay.”
Poetic Quality
Next in order comes Mr Lintott, as restrained as Mr Gillies is voluptuous, but with a lovely poetic quality in all his works. The most important, “Spring Fantasy,” has all the true Lintott qualities—charming colour, expressive and meticulous drawing, and a finely realised effect of flowing movement. A small landscape, “Noonday” is full of mellow sunshine, and “A Sussex Garden” has the authentic atmosphere of its subject. Two invited flower pieces by Audrey Lintott are well-handled examples of this genre. Mr Alison, who occupies the next section of this wall shows three portraits, all first rate, and a number of landscapes, still-life studies, and flower pieces, which make up a convincing demonstration of his skill in the handling of paint. The “Still-life with Flowers” is notable for harmonious gradations of colour and tone; and a landscape, "Strathcona" for its interesting pattern.
Child Studies
The strength of Archibald McGlashan’s painting could not be better illustrated than by the 21 works on exhibition. Mostly small in size, these paintings possess a carrying power on which distance has no effect, and though some of them have the appearance of quick sketches, there is a deal of thoughtful elimination of unessentials behind their apparent casualness. As usual with this painter, studies of children predominate, and very attractive they are. “Head of a Child” and “Child Asleep” are among the best, and a landscape, “Capri,” is a notable example of simplification. At the far end of the gallery Mr MacTaggart revels with as much gusto as does Mr Gillies at the other, but in a different motif. It is at times difficult to follow Mr Gillies’ conception of form, but with Mr MacTaggart the natural forms are there, noted, organised, and set down with an entirely individual sense of rhythm and a sheer joy in the handling of paint. A considerable proportion of Mr MacTaggart’s works are Norwegian scenes, in which the predominating note of blue is in interesting contrast to his Scottish work. A large “Still-life with Guitar” is a striking design, and there is a telling realisation of the open air in “View of Oslo.”
The Famous Red Chair
Almost the whole of the next wall is devoted to the Cadells, a finely representative collection, covering the main aspects of the work of this very individual painter. Interiors, with the famous red chair, still-life studies, the vivid and stylistic “Lady in Black,” some lovely Iona colour harmonies, the geometrical “ Still-life with Fan,” and the restrained "lnterior, Regent Terrace" have all been seen before, but one is profoundly grateful for .this chance 10 see them again, And in the small gallery are a few examples of that unique Cadell facility in conveying some human peculiarity by three lines and a dot or so, with an economy of means and a psychological insight peculiarly his own. Sir John Lavery is represented by four of his Coronation sketches in colour, very slick and suggestive notes, and there are also invited works by Duncan Grant and John Nash. The exhibition will remain open until February 5.

There was no exhibition in 1939 from the Society. The Edinburgh Evening News of Saturday 7 January 1939 reported:

NO SOCIETY OF EIGHT EXHIBITION It is announced that one of the oldest groups of artists exhibiting representative works — the Society of Eight — will not hold an annual exhibition this year and will thus break a succession of 26 displays which have been held each year in Edinburgh. Of the original eight members, only two remain — Sir John Lavery and Mr David Alison. The Society lost Mr S. J. Peploe and Mr F. C. B. Cadell within the last three years, and the vacancies had not been filled when the exhibition was held last year.

== Legacy ==
In terms of bridging the Glasgow - Edinburgh divide, the Society of Eight had a limited impact. It was never seen as a 50:50 venture, the term to describe the society was usually 'Edinburgh based'. Its exhibition space was in Edinburgh, never in Glasgow. Starting at the outset as a 5:3 split for Edinburgh to Glasgow painters, a more frequent split was 6:2 for Edinburgh to Glasgow painters. Indeed only John Lavery was a constant for Glasgow throughout the Society's lifetime.

The Society of Eight did succeed in bringing a high quality exhibition annually throughout its run, by its limited membership and its selected guest exhibitors. As an indication of this, it took a few years before the famous Scottish Colourist Samuel Peploe formally became a member.
