= Cadenhead =

Cadenhead is a surname. Notable people with the surname include:

- Bradley Cadenhead, sex offender and founder of 764 (organization)
- James Cadenhead (1858–1927), Scottish landscape and portrait painter
- Rogers Cadenhead (born 1967), American computer book author and web publisher
