= Annie Macdonald =

Annie Macdonald may refer to:

- Annie MacDonald, British courtier
- Annie S. Macdonald, Scottish artistic bookbinder
- Annie MacDonald Langstaff, Canadian law student, legal activist, supporter of women's suffrage and woman aviator
