= Guild of Women-Binders =

The Guild of Women-Binders was a British organization founded to promote and distribute the work of women bookbinders at the turn of the 20th century. It was founded by Frank (Francis) Karslake in 1898, and disbanded in 1904. It helped sell bindings produced by women binders already practicing, and instituted training programs to teach other women.

== History ==
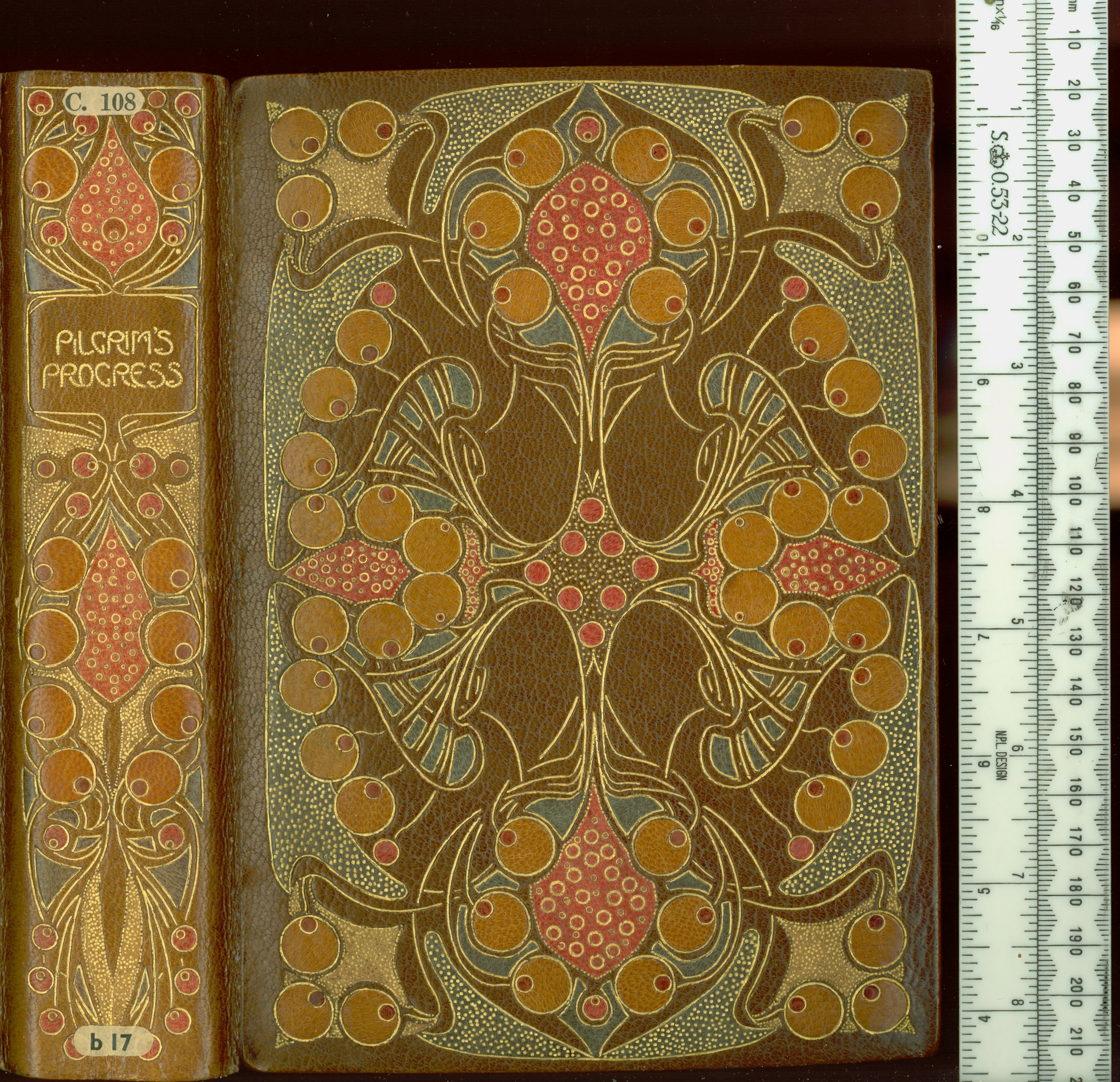
An edition of The Pilgrim's Progress produced by the Guild of Women Binders, held at the British Library. Likely bound by Gwladys Edwards.

Frank Karslake was a London bookseller, and a founder and financial backer of the Hampstead Bindery. At the 1897 Victorian Era Exhibition at Earl's Court, he encountered several bindings by women, including Annie S. Macdonald, on display, and his interest was piqued. Soon after, he invited several women binders to exhibit their work in his London shop; this "Exhibition of Artistic Bookbinding by Women," which ran from November 1897 to February 1898, garnered a substantial amount of interest from the public, and convinced him that promoting women's bookbindings could be a profitable venture, if perhaps partially for the novelty. Whatever his motivations, Karslake soon began acting as an agent to women binders already practicing, such as Annie MacDonald and Edith and Florence de Rheims.

By May 1898, the Guild of Women Binders was open as a business venture, headquartered at Karslake's bookstore at 61 Charing Cross Road. Karslake "saw that more money could be made by teaching to bind than by only binding and selling books. He maintained that women were well-suited to be bookbinders, due to their "inborn reverence for the beautiful" and their deftness of hand. He focused on both promoting the work of women already engaged in bookbinding, and training additional women to create bindings. Every member of the Guild received training in hand-bookbinding, and were offered employment after they completed this training.

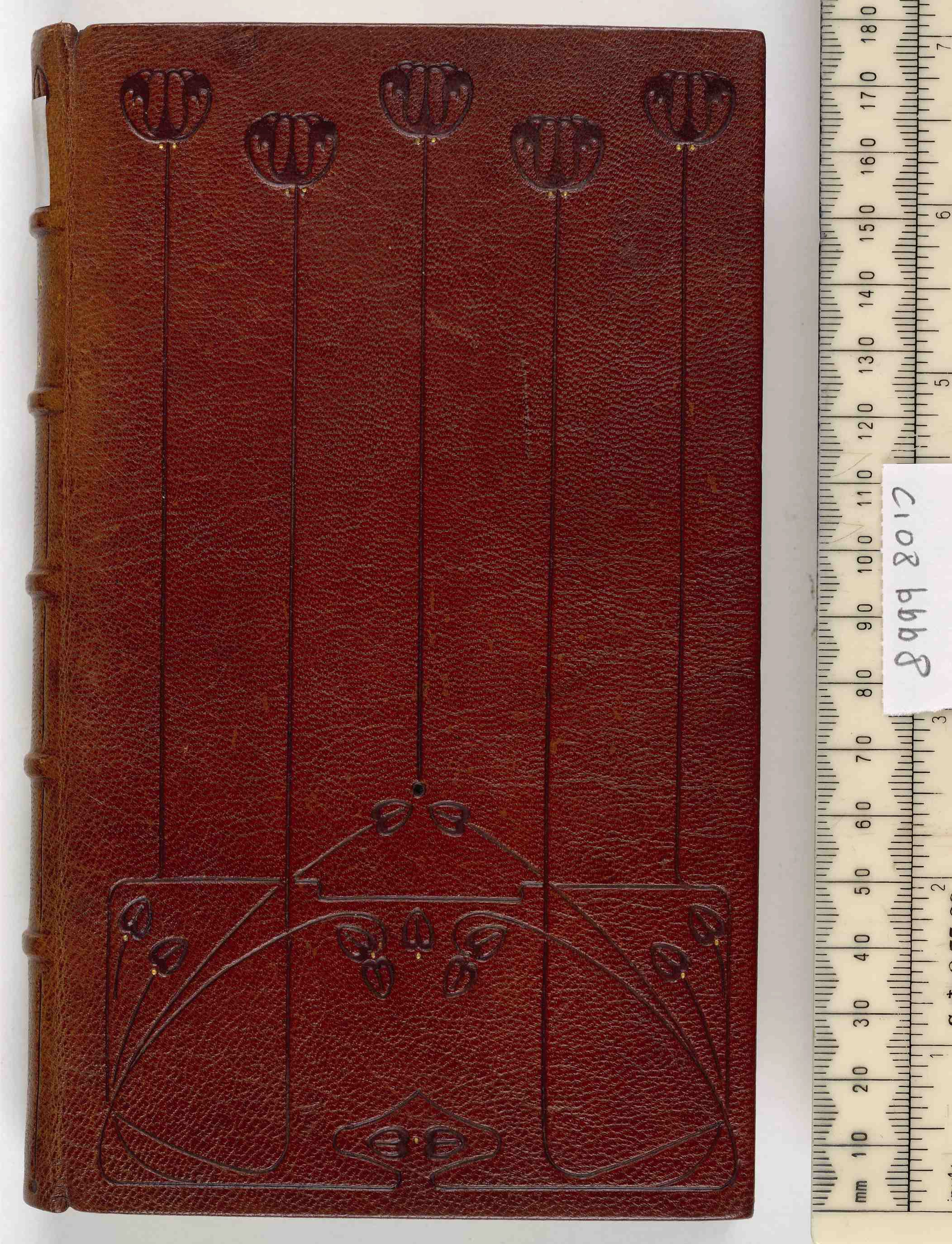
An edition of "Poems descriptive of rural life and scenery" by John Clare, produced by the Guild of Women Binders, held at the British Library.

Members and associates of the Guild of Women Binders carved out a niche for themselves at the end of the 19th century by producing fine, artistic bindings by hand in an era when bookbinding was becoming increasingly mechanized. As part of its training efforts, the Guild set up a workshop, headed by Karslake's daughter Constance, near the Hampstead Bindery in 1899. The Guild accepted for training only women with an art school background, likely limiting them to a small pool of middle-class women; by 1903, they had an estimated 25-30 students. In keeping with the artistic styles of the time, many of the bindings featured Art Nouveau patterns, with sweeping lines and elegantly curved shapes. Karslake's advertising claimed that each binding was decorated with a unique pattern, though several patterns seem to have been variations of others.

The Guild promoted and sold not only its own bindings, but also those of other groups such as the Chiswick Art Guild. Consequently, the presence of a stamp of the Guild of Women Binders on a book may not necessarily mean that it was created by the Guild unless the individual binder can be identified, and may mean "little more than a bookseller's stamp."

Ultimately, the Guild was not a successful business venture, possibly due to Karslake's inexperience in the professional bookbinding world (despite his associations with several binding operations, he had never worked as a binder himself). Karslake had tried to grow the Guild too far and too fast, taking on more students than teachers, and expecting too much out of his teaching staff. Some professional bookbinders suspected that the bindings were too sophisticated to have been produced by women, especially recently trained ones; a few even accused Karslake of passing off the work of the Hampstead Bindery as Guild work. Potential buyers began to mistrust Karslake and the guild's products (with some justification, as Karslake and his workshops had little knowledge of sound bookbinding techniques such as those practiced by other Arts and Crafts binders of the time), and many bindings went unsold. The Guild was shuttered in 1904, leaving Karslake bankrupt and many of the women who had worked with him tainted by the controversy (though some did go on to continue independent careers as bookbinders).

== Notable people ==
This is an incomplete list of women binders associated with the Guild.

- Ella Bailey
- Hélène Cox
- Mary Downing
- Muriel Driffield
- "TMD"
- Gwladys Edwards
- Gertrude Giles
- Dorothy Holmes
- Annie S. Macdonald
- Constance Karslake
- Olive Karslake
- Helen Schofield
- Mrs. Frances Knight
- Lilian Overton
- Edith de Rheims
- Florence de Rheims
- Ethel Slater
- Gertrude Stiles
- H. W. Sym
