= James Campbell Noble =

Scottish painter (1845–1913)

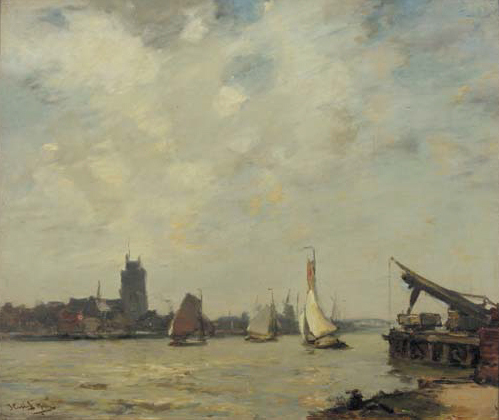
Painting by James Campbell Noble

James Campbell Noble RSA (22 July 1845 – 25 September 1913) was a Scottish painter. He signed his paintings, mostly in the left hand bottom corner, as J.C. Noble or as J.Campbell Noble.

== Education ==
He initially studied at the board of manufacturing in Edinburgh and then the Royal Scottish Academy schools under William McTaggart and George Paul Chalmers.

== Biography ==
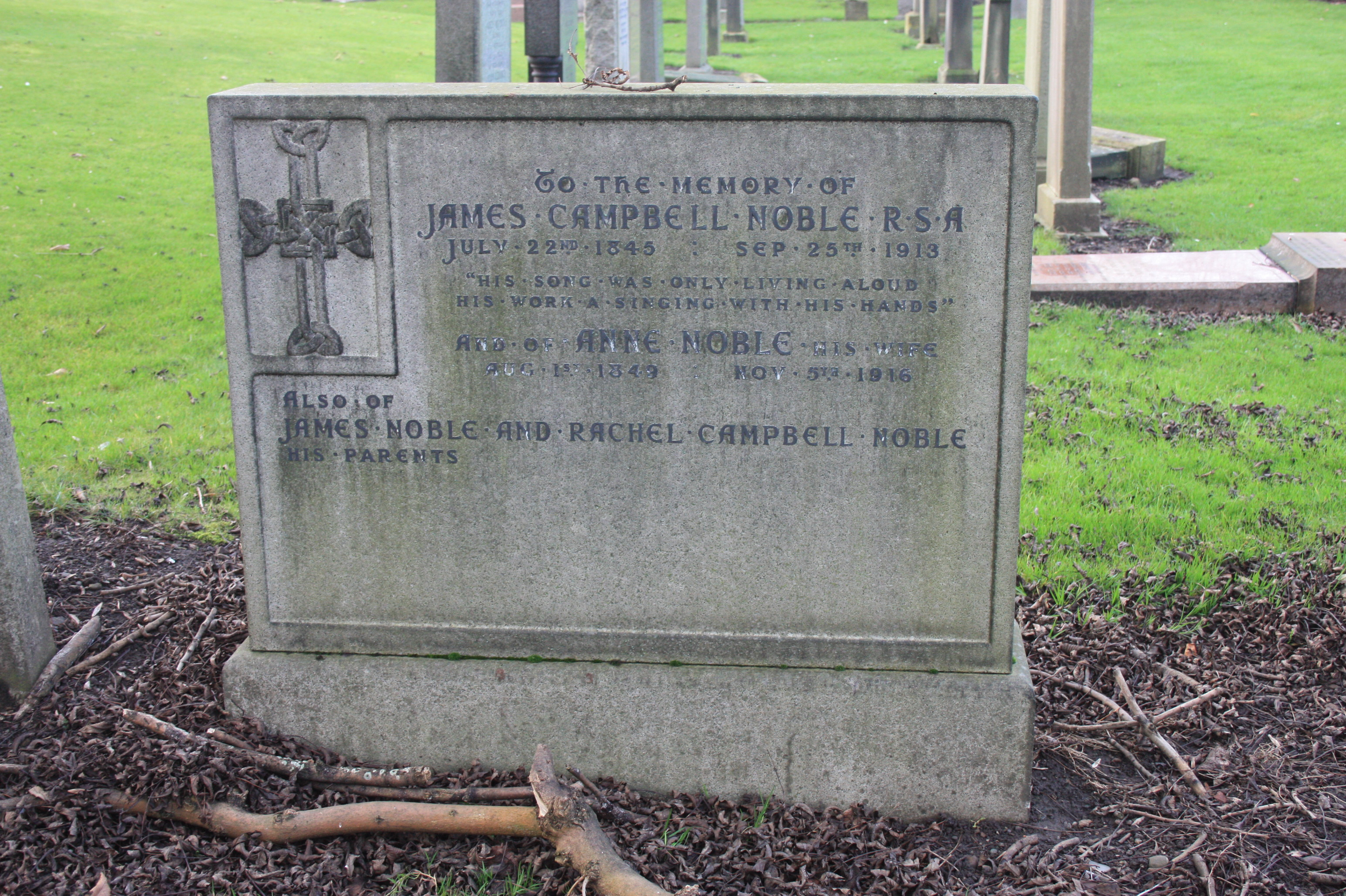
The grave of James Campbell Noble, Rosebank Cemetery

James Campbell Noble was born in Edinburgh on 22 July 1845, the son of James Noble and Rachel Campbell.

Three of his cousins were also artists: Robert Noble RSA (1857–1917), James Inglis Noble (1853-1912), and David Noble (1865-1890). J.C. Noble apprenticed Robert in 1871 and possibly taught the other two cousins as well.

He traveled throughout Europe to paint, where the Netherlands and Italy were particularly favorites. He had a studio on Picardy Place and was a teacher at the Royal Scottish Academy art class on The Mound and at the Trustees Academy on Picardy Place. His pupils included Robert Gemmell Hutchison.

Initially he began with rustic genre like dark cottages and outside life. Then when he became a member of ARSA in 1879 and the Royal Scottish Academy in 1892, he abandoned the previous subject for land- and seascape scenery and marine paintings of rivers and ports. He painted the scenery on the Clyde, Seine, Tyne, Merwede, Maas (Meus) and Rhine.

For a long part of his live he lived in the Netherlands where his favorite port for painting seemed to have been Dordrecht, Dort for short. There are quite a number of his oil paintings painted in this harbour facility, which also seem to have attracted other painters. However he also painted in places like 's-Gravendeel, Volendam and Zaandam. In the early 1880s he painted the rocky coastal scenes of Berwickshire whilst he was living in Coldingham. He returned however to the Netherlands in 1900 painting the Dutch waterways again.

Towards the end of his life he lived again in Scotland, where he lived in Dumfries and Galloway and where he is also mentioned in Corstorphine in 1896. His Sunset near Glencaple exhibited at Royal Scottish Academy in 1913. His portrait was painted by the well known portrait painter John Pettie and is exhibited in the Scottish National Portrait Gallery in Edinburgh.

In later life he lived at 12 Queen Street in Edinburgh's First New Town.

He died on 25 September 1913 whilst in Ledaig, Argyll.

He is buried in Rosebank Cemetery in Edinburgh midway along the eastern path of the main area. His cousin Robert Noble RSA lies alongside.

== Exhibited ==
Royal Scottish Academy; Royal Glasgow Institute of Fine Art, Liverpool Museum, Aberdeen Artists Society; Royal Academy in London from 1880 to 1896.

== Works and locations ==
See

- A Watermill : Lawrence House Museum
- The Old Wharf, Dordrecht, Holland : Victoria Art Gellery
- Tarbet : Sheffield Museum
- A Study : Glasgow Museums
- A Dutch Scene : Liverpool Museums
- Sunday Morning : Liverpool Museums
- Looking up Strathspey, Aberdeen Art Gallery
- Dordrecht : Fife Council
- Outward Bound : Smith Art Gallery and Museum, Stirling
- Harbour Scene with Fishing Boats : Perth and Kinross Council
- A Grey Day with Dutch Fishing Boats : Perth and Kinross Council
- Half-tide Rocks, East Coast Berwickshire : Royal Scottish Academy
- Waves : National Trust for Scotland
- Dutch Canal Scene : National Trust for Scotland
- Sunset near Glencaple on Solway : National Gallery of Scotland

== See also ==
- List of Scots
