= William Hole (artist) =

British artist (1846–1917)

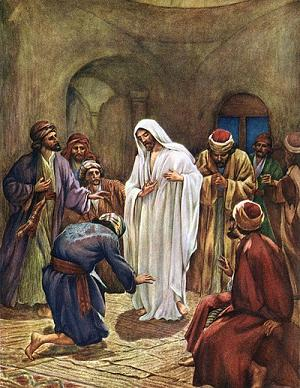
Jesus appears to the disciples

William Brassey Hole RSA (7 November 1846 – 22 October 1917) was a Scottish Victorian painter, illustrator, etcher, and engraver. He was known for his industrial, historical and biblical scenes.

== Life ==
=== Early life and training ===
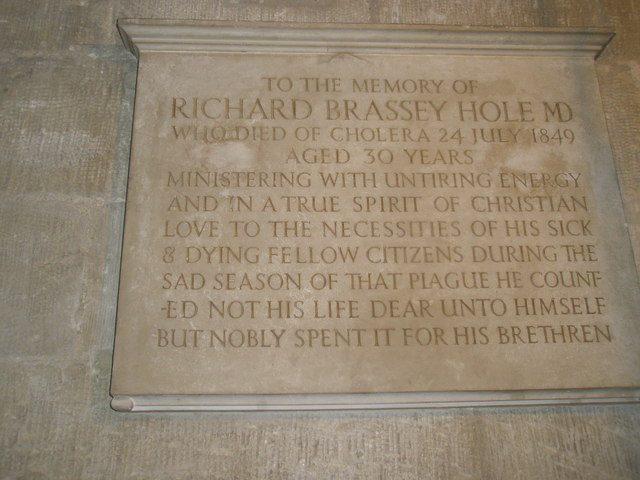
Monument to Richard Brassey Hole in Salisbury Cathedral

Hole was born in Salisbury, Wiltshire, the son of a doctor, Richard Brassey Hole and his wife Ann Burn Hole (nee Fergusson); his father died in the cholera epidemic of 1849, when William was only 3 years of age, and the family relocated to Edinburgh, Scotland, shortly afterwards. He was educated at Edinburgh Academy, then served an apprenticeship as a civil engineer for 5 years, although he really wanted to be an artist.

In 1869, he sailed from Swansea to Genoa, and spent the next 6 months travelling and sketching around Italy. In Rome he made the acquaintance of Keeley Halswelle who gave him practical advice on art. It was Halswelle whose criticism encouraged Hole to endeavour to become a professional painter.

On returning to Edinburgh, Hole entered the School of Design, then won admission to the life school of the Royal Scottish Academy, first exhibiting there in 1873; in 1878 he was elected an associate of the Academy. Around this time he took up etching and was accepted into the Royal Society of Painters and Etchers (RE) in 1885; he was already a member of the Royal Scottish Watercolour Society (RSW) from 1884. He eventually became a full member of the Academy (RSA).

=== Career ===
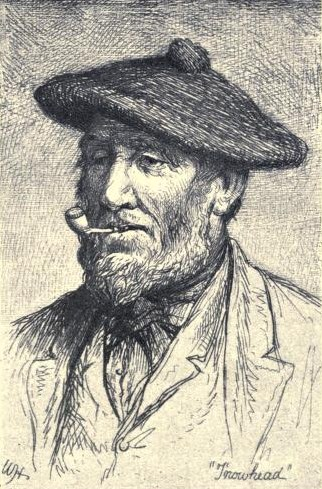
Illustration from A window in Thrums (by J M Barrie)

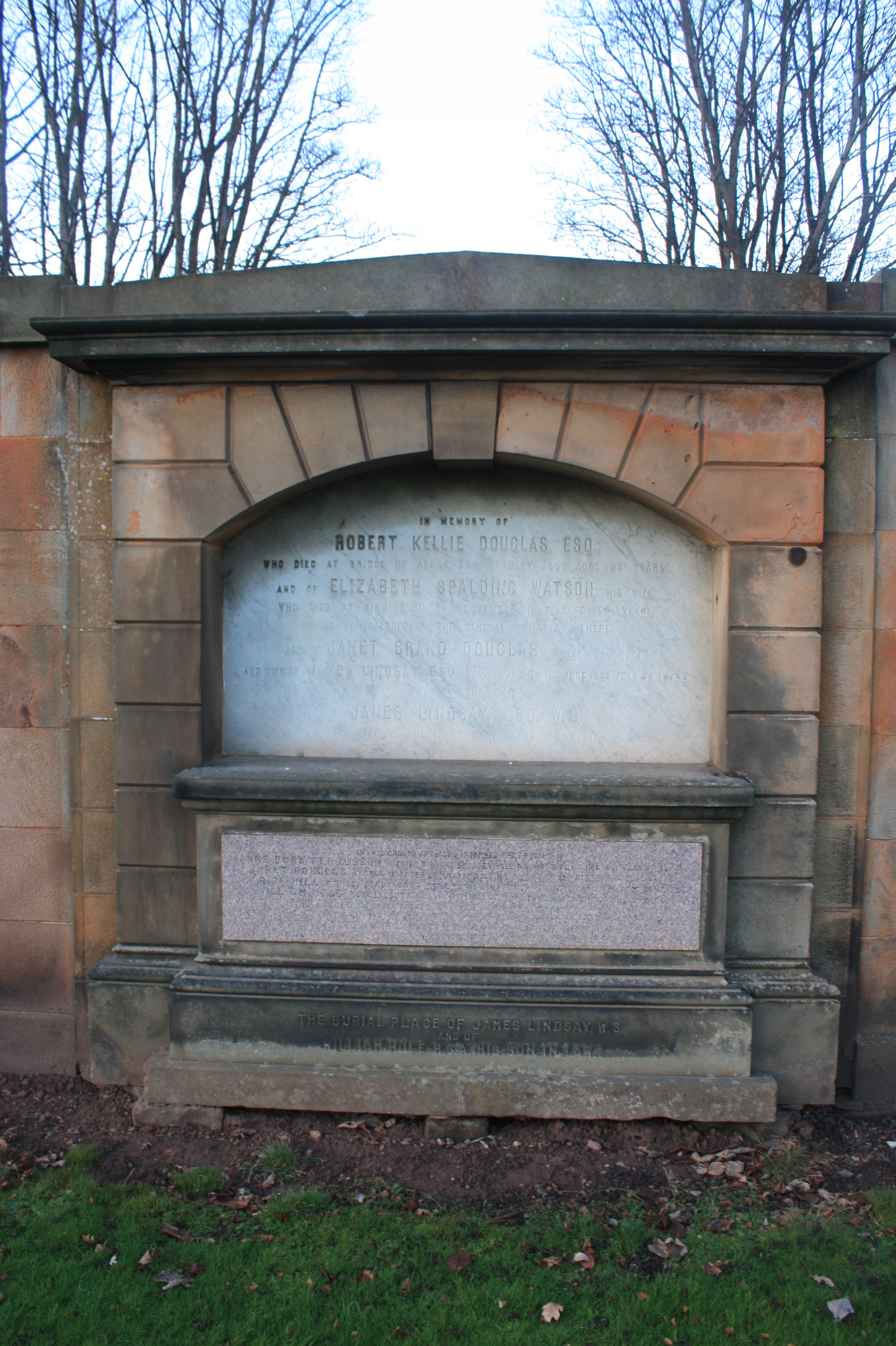
The grave of William Hole RSA, Grange Cemetery, Edinburgh

Hole went on to specialise in painting industrial and historical material. Although born in England, his mother was Scottish, he was brought up, studied, lived, worked and died in Edinburgh, and devoted much of his energies to Scottish national subjects and purposes.

Principal paintings include End of the '45 (1879), A Straggler of the Chevalier's Army, Culloden, Prince Charlie's Parliament (1882), If thou hadst known (1885) and The Canterbury Pilgrims (1889). Other paintings included Medea in the Island of Circe, several based on Arthurian legend, and several depicting the life of fishermen on the west coast of Scotland, exhibited in 1883–84. Of the latter, The Night's Catch and The fill of the two Boats were praised by critics.

Hole's etchings were also highly regarded, one critic describing them as "perhaps the most wonderful translations of colour and handling, of design and conception and spirit, into another artistic medium ever made, and entitle their author to rank with creative artists of the highest class".

Hole was an Episcopalian, and attended the Episcopal Church of St James, Goldenacre. In 1894 onwards, he undertook to decorate the church, in his spare time and at no charge, with mural paintings, which later led to the commission for his work at the Scottish National Portrait Gallery.

In 1898 Hole painted a Processional Frieze for the entrance hall of the Scottish National Portrait Gallery, showing over 150 figures or "heroes" from Scotland's past. A critic described this work as "one of the most notable essays in mural decoration ever accomplished in this country". He also provided historical paintings for Edinburgh City Chambers and ecclesiastical decorations for other buildings.

Around 1900, he travelled to Palestine in order to study the background for biblical painting. There he began working on the 80 watercolours that would eventually appear as illustrations in his book The Life of Jesus of Nazareth. In April to May 1906 these pictures were shown at an exhibition at the Fine Art Society in London. He also painted scenes from the Old Testament.

Hole drew the black and white illustrations for several books including works by Robert Louis Stevenson, J M Barrie, and Robert Burns.

In later life he lived at 13 Inverleith Terrace in north Edinburgh, his neighbour at 15 being fellow-artist James Cadenhead.

Hole died in Edinburgh in 1917. He is buried in the Grange Cemetery in the ground of James Lindsay in the centre of the north wall. His name is listed at the base of the monument along with other members of the Hole family.

== Selected works ==
These are some of the publications which Hole illustrated:

- Hole, William. Quasi cursores (Edinburgh Univ. Press, 1884)
- Stevenson, R. L. The Wrecker (New York: Charles Scribner's Sons, 1892)
- Stevenson, R. L. Catriona (London: Cassell & Co. Ltd., 1893)
- MacLaren, Ian. Beside The Bonnie Brier Bush (Hodder & Stoughton, 1896).
- Barrie, J. M. Auld Licht Idylls (London: Hodder & Stoughton, 1902)
- Barrie, J. M. A Window in Thrums (London: Hodder & Stoughton, 1902)
- Hole, William. The life of Jesus of Nazareth: eighty pictures (Eyre & Spottiswoode, 1906)
- Hole William. The Holy Bible. Containing The Old And New Testaments (Eyre & Spottiswoode, 1925)

== Gallery ==
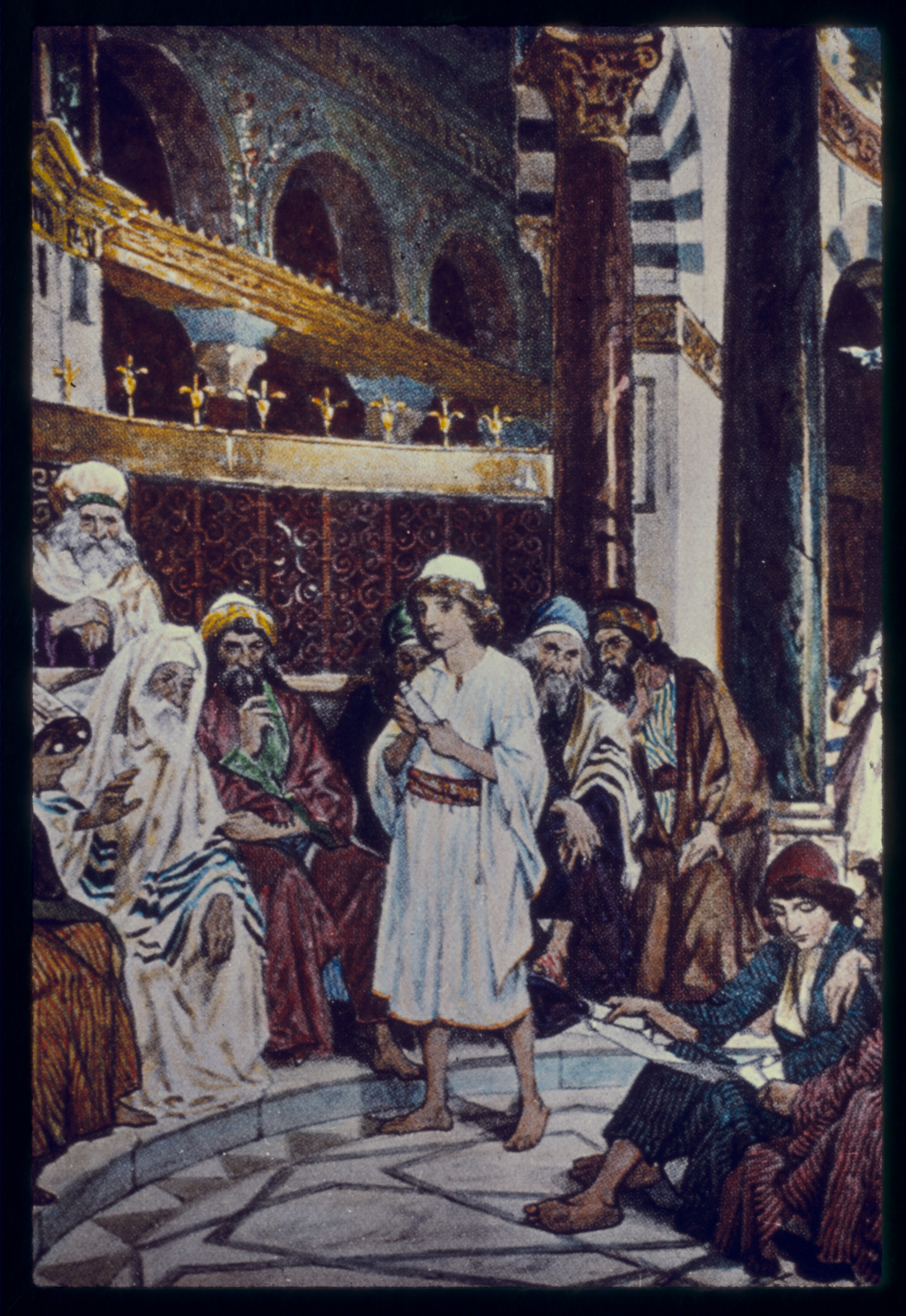
"Jesus... seeking instruction from the doctors of the law" (Luke 2:41-50)

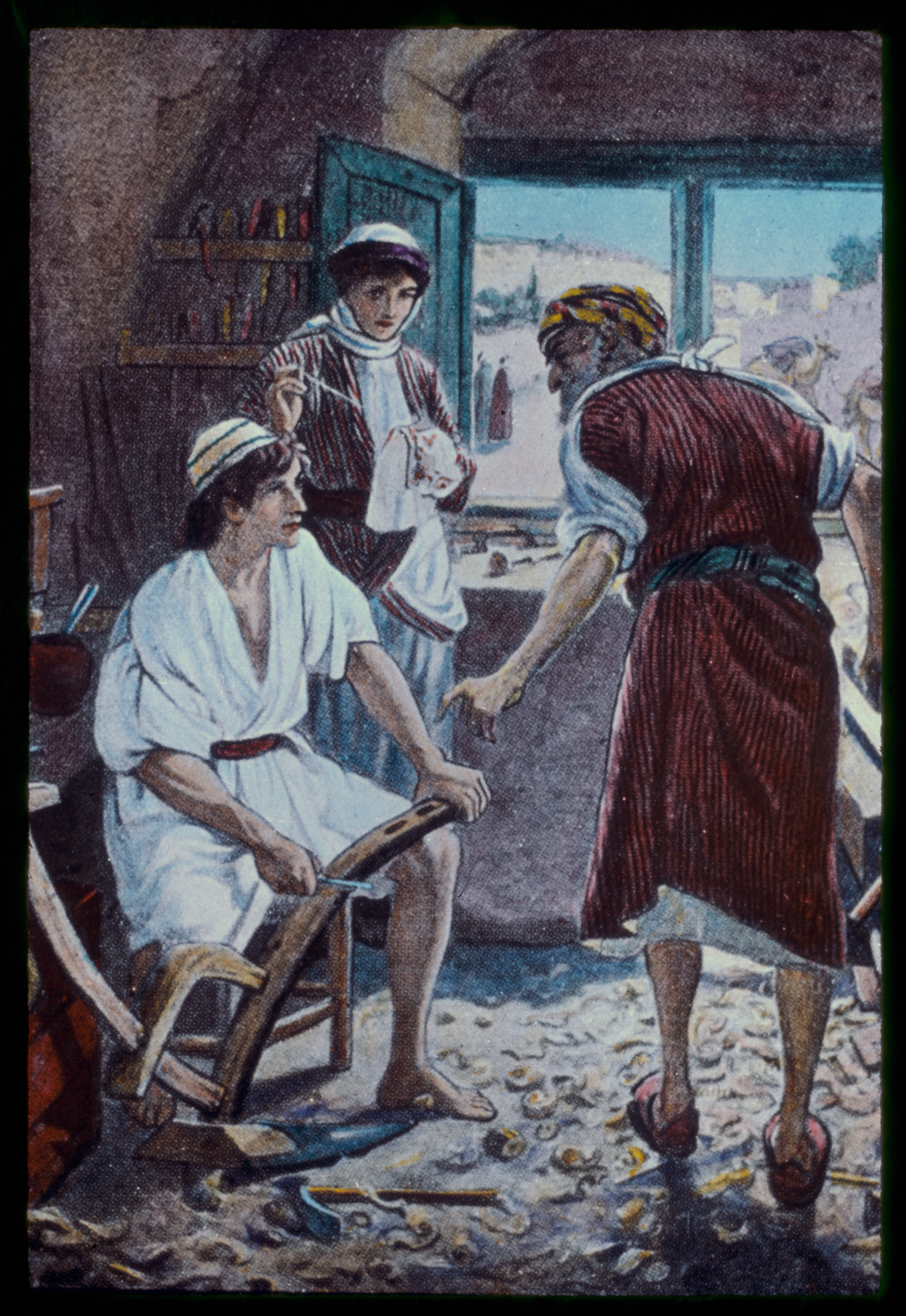
"Jesus returneth with his parents to Nazareth" (Luke 2:51-52)

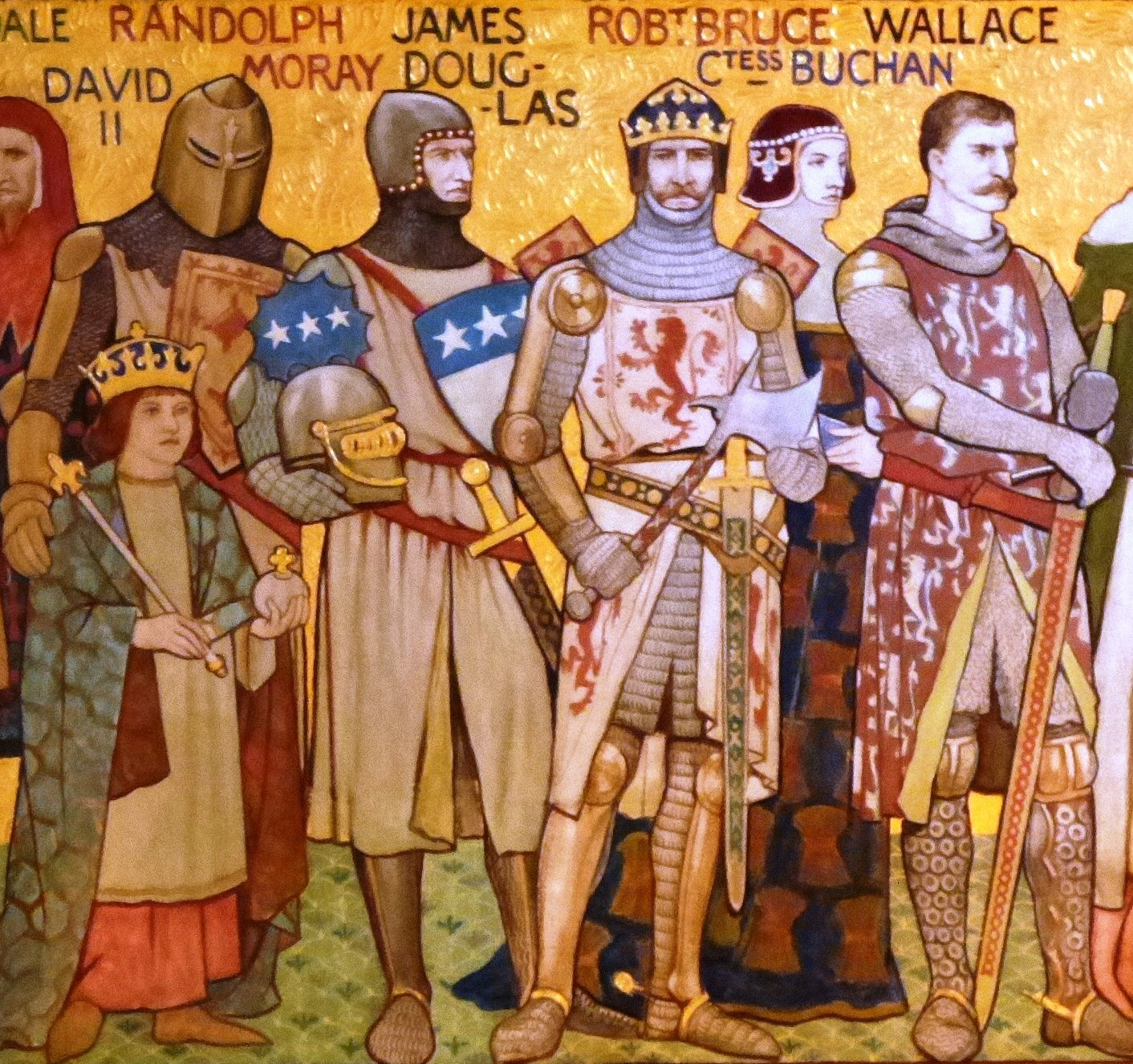
First War of Scottish Independence

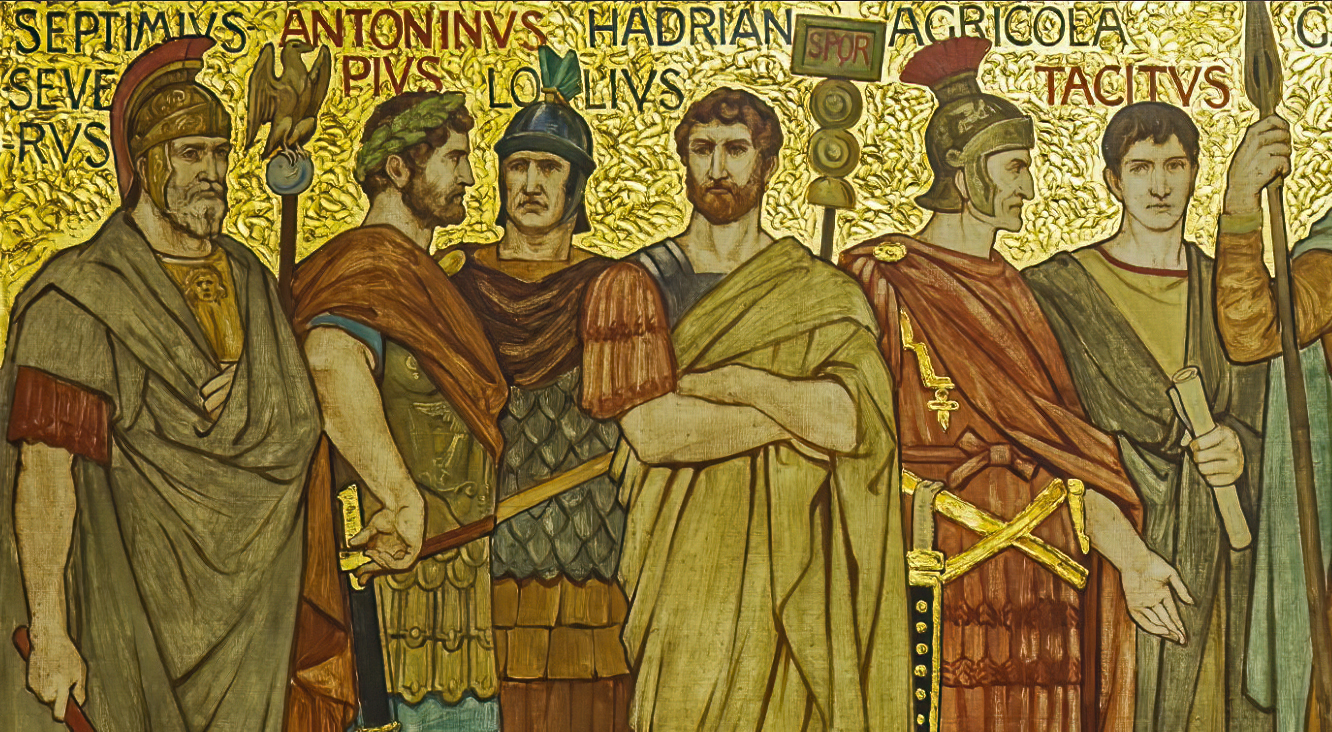
Roman generals and emperors closeup in a frieze at the Great Hall of the Scottish National Gallery

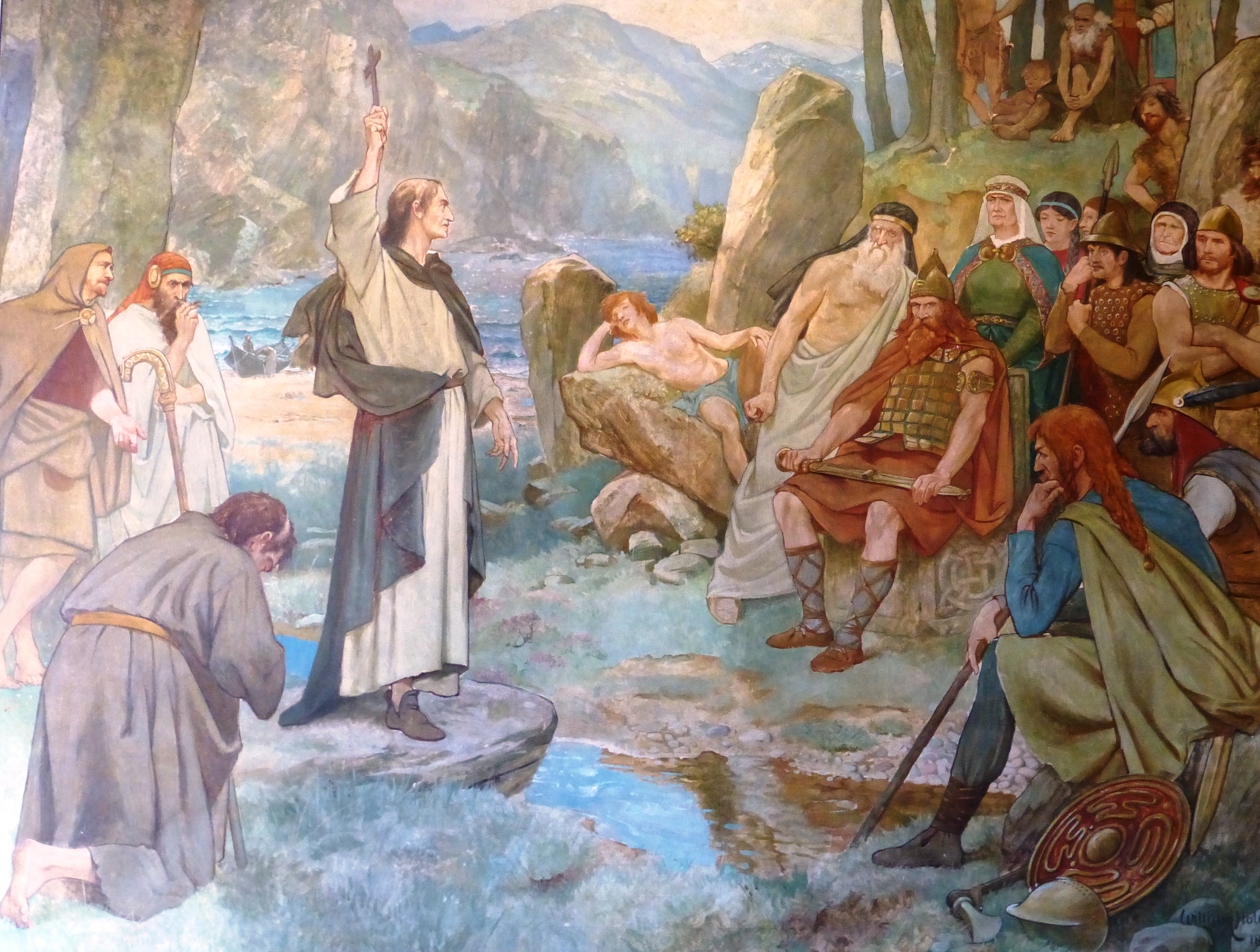
Saint Columba converting the Picts

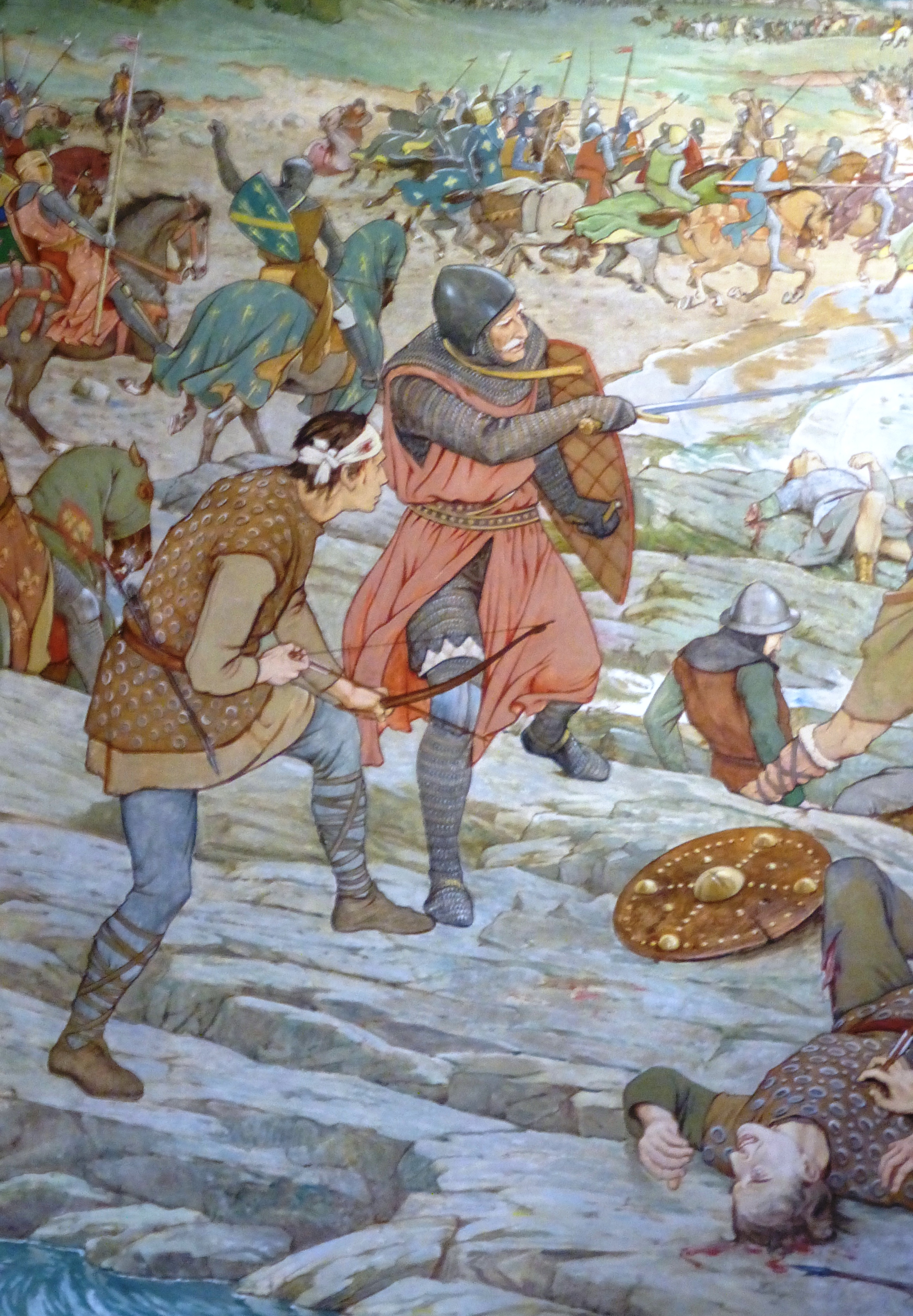
Battle of Largs

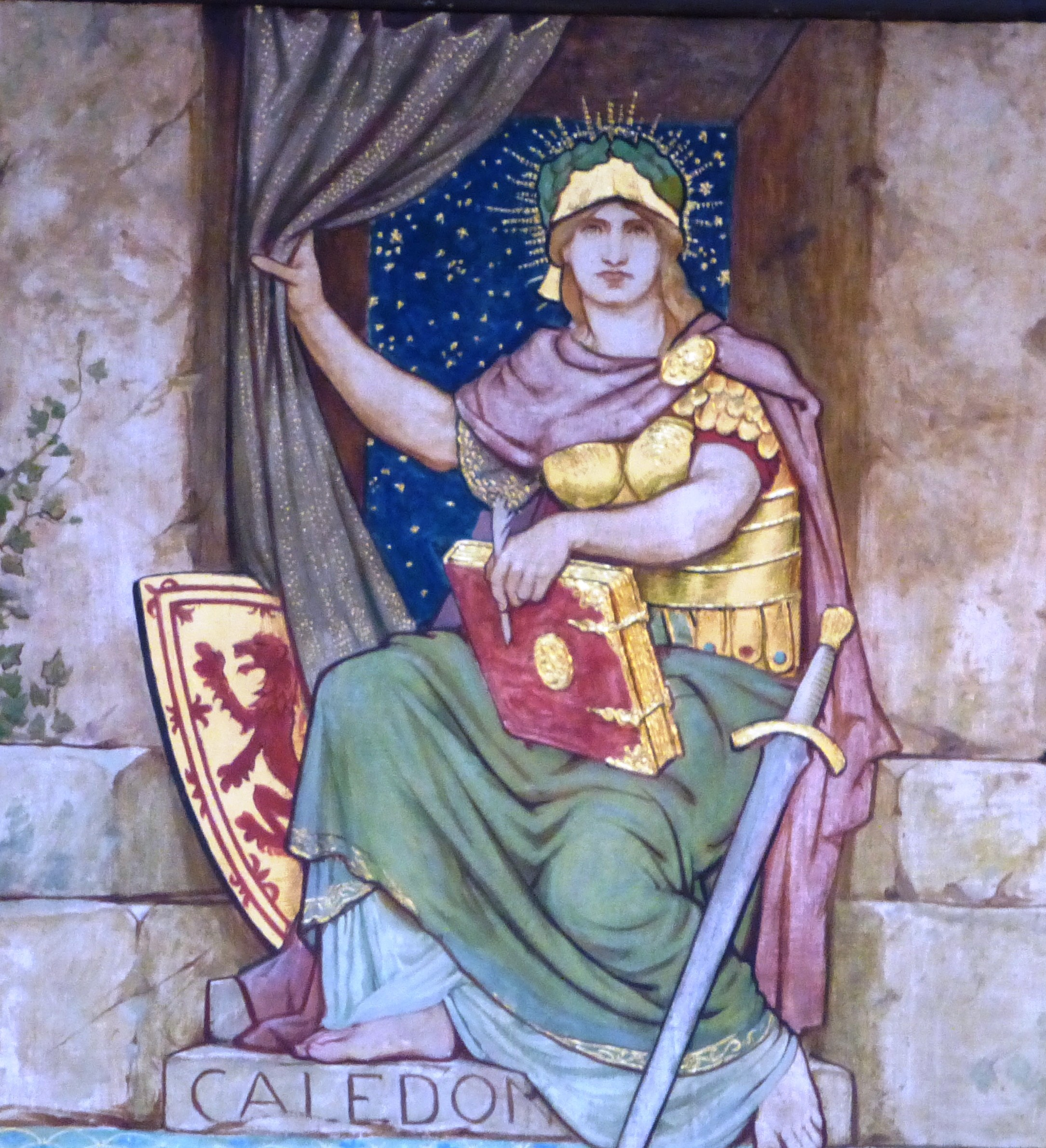
Caledonia
