= Annie S. Macdonald =

Scottish bookbinder (1849–1924)

Ann Smith MacDonald
- Born: Ann Smith Johnston; 20 November 1849; Barony, Lanark.
- Died: 21 October 1924 (aged 74); Edinburgh, Scotland.
- Known for: Artistic bookbinder

Annie Smith MacDonald (née Johnston; 20 November 1849 – 21 October 1924) was an artistic bookbinder from Scotland, active in the 1890s and the early 20th century. She was known for her study of old binding techniques, determining how book bindings were created in the medieval era and duplicating the methods used.

== Biography ==
She was born Ann Smith Johnston in Barony, Lanark, on 20 November 1849, to Lucy Leitch and Fred Johnston, a bank cashier. She was raised in Lanark and Glasgow, and in 1880 married William MacDonald, an Edinburgh businessman and secretary of the Scottish Metropolitan Life Assurance Company and later Carrick Pursuivant and Albany Herald.

The MacDonalds' circle of friends in Edinburgh included art critic John Miller Gray and Phoebe Anna Traquair. MacDonald and Gray began "searching out and enjoying old bindings in libraries," and this pastime led to an interest in trying the art of bookbinding for themselves. Walter Biggar Blaikie, another friend of the MacDonalds, allowed Annie MacDonald to practice in the workroom of the A. & T. Constable printing firm. There, she honed her skills and worked with the Edinburgh Social Union, of which she was a member, to institute a series of bookbinding classes led by employees of the Constable firm.

Out of her practice in the Constable workroom, Annie MacDonald developed a method of embossing a leather binding which she would use throughout her career. Working on a goatskin binding that had already been attached to a book, she would dampen the leather, trace a design on to the surface, and work the design in relief using a leatherworking tool called a "Dresden."

She became a leading member in a group of Edinburgh women binders (including Jessie MacGibbon, Mrs. Douglas MacLagan, Jean Pagin, and Phoebe Anna Traquair). Her medievalist bindings began to gain attention, and were selected along with others from her Edinburgh group for display in the Women's Work section of the Victorian Era Exhibition at Earl's Court, London in 1897. There, they attracted attention of Frank Karslake, a bookseller, who was inspired to host an exhibition of women's bookbindings at his London bookstore. Karslake offered to act as a sales agent for several women binders, including MacDonald, who was excited to have an outlet for her bindings in London. MacDonald was later loosely associated with Karslake's venture, the Guild of Women Binders, until its dissolution in 1904, although she only sold a few of her bindings through it.

Annie Smith MacDonald died in Edinburgh on 21 October 1924.
