= Robert Noble (artist) =

Scottish artist (1857–1917)

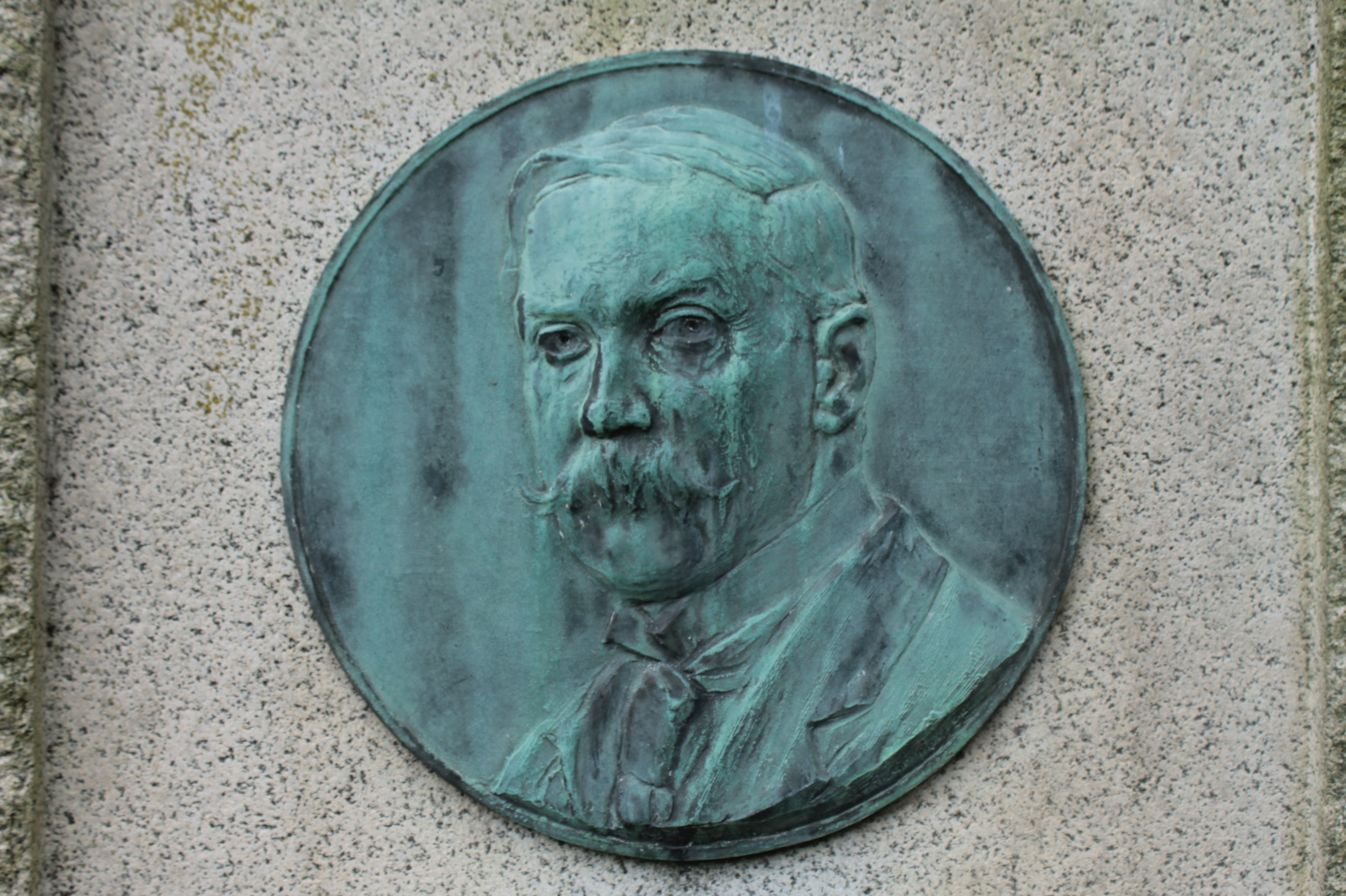
Medallion portrait of Robert Noble by Henry Snell Gamley, Robert Noble's grave

Robert Noble RSA PSSA (27 January 1857 – 12 May 1917) was a Scottish artist specialising in landscapes. He was the first President of the Society of Scottish Artists.

== Life ==
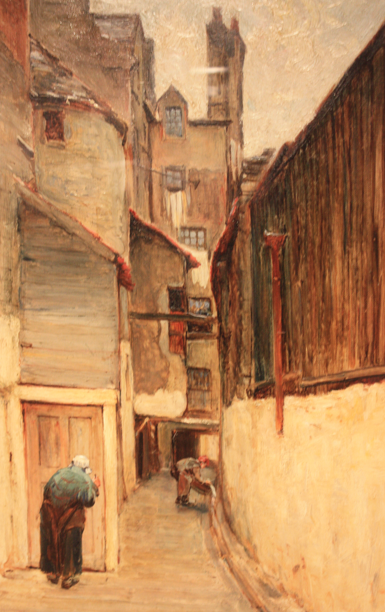
Plainstanes Close, Edinburgh by Robert Noble

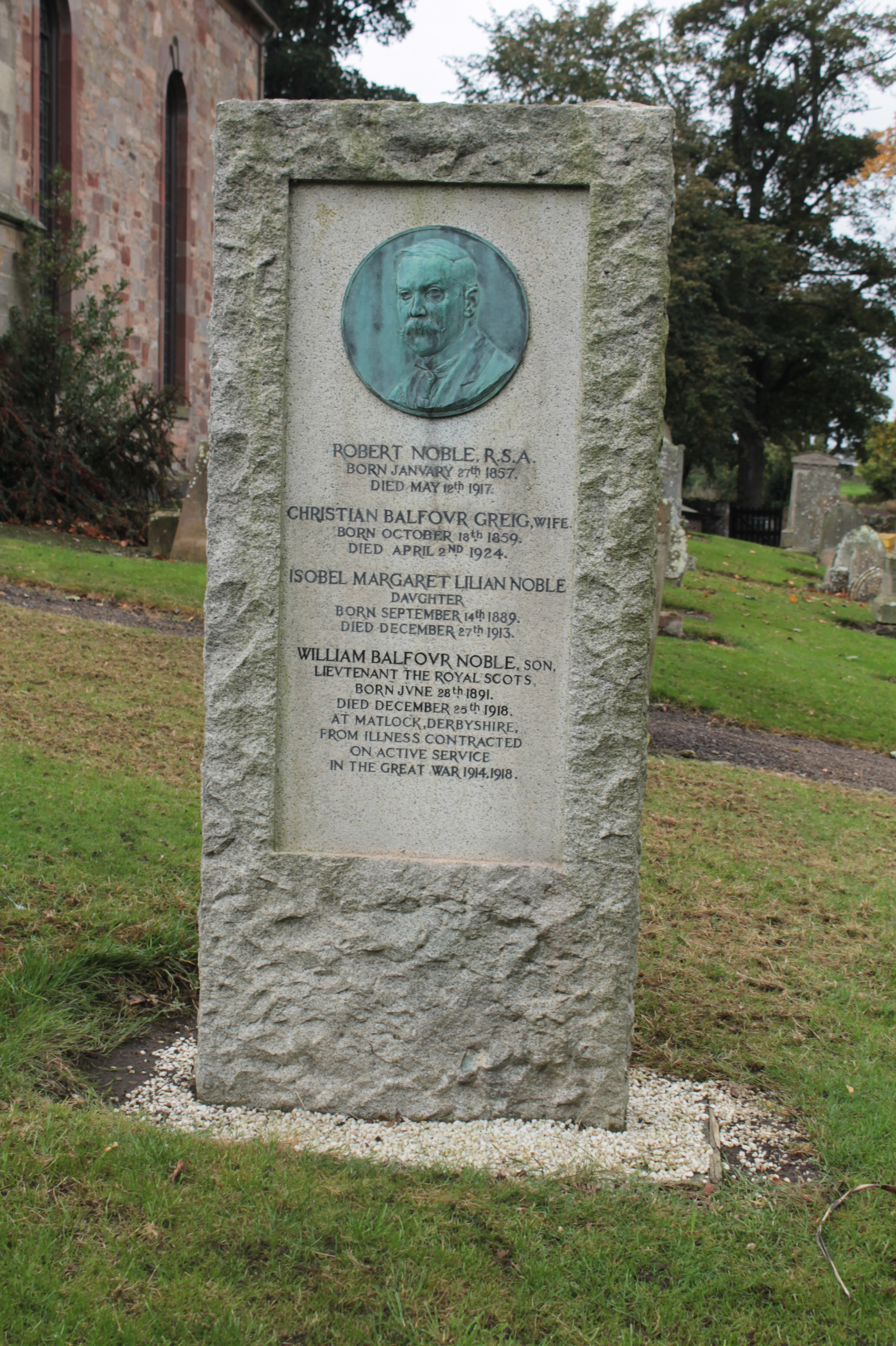
The grave of Robert Noble in the graveyard of Prestonkirk

He was born in Edinburgh to Thomas Noble (b.1825), a railwayman, and his wife, Janet Inglis.

In 1871 he was apprenticed to an engraver but also worked with his older cousin, James Campbell Noble, who was then an up-and-coming artist. He encouraged him to study further and Robert went to Paris to train under Carolus-Duran. Here his genre changed from figurative to mainly landscapes.

In the early 1880s he joined a small community of artists in the picturesque village of East Linton, east of Edinburgh. Here he worked alongside Thomas Bromley Blacklock and William Miller Frazer.

In 1890, he was co-founder of the Society of Scottish Artists and served as their first President. In 1892 he became an Associate of the Royal Scottish Academy and in 1903 became a full member.

In 1905 he was residing at 12 Queen Street in the New Town, Edinburgh.

He died suddenly on 12 May 1917 at home at "The Neuk" in East Linton and is buried nearby in Prestonkirk churchyard. The grave lies near the north east corner of the church and has a bronze medallion portrait by Henry Snell Gamley. He was an elder of the church there. He was an avid angler and golfer and was also a freemason.

In May 2017 East Linton marked the centenary of his death.

== Family ==
He was married to Christian Balfour Greig (1859-1924).

His son William Balfour Noble (1891–1918) died of wounds sustained in the First World War serving with the 8th battalion Royal Scots. He died on Christmas Day 1918. His nephew William Balfour Noble was born on the day he died and named in his honour.

== Known works ==
See

- Plainstane’s Close, Edinburgh (1878)
- Under the Sea Wall (1892)
- Summertime (1903)
- Leading, East Linton (1905)
- View of East Linton (1907)
- Springtime, Prestonkirk (1909)
- Dirleton church, East Lothian (1912), Tate Gallery
- Landscape With Cattle, near Bridge of Earn (1913)
- An Old Castle Orchard, Longniddry (1914)
- Pasture (1914)
- Prestonkirk Mill
- Dovecot, East Linton
- Still Life of Sweet Peas
- Reston near Duns
- Sweet Lilac
- Rouen
- On the Beach, Buckhaven
- East Linton at Dusk

Noble also created the Roll of Honour which hangs in Prestonkirk Church covering the years 1914 to 1916.
