= John Miller Gray =

British writer on art and curator

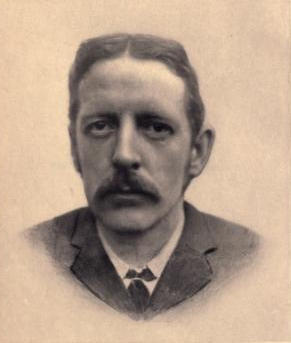
- Portrait of John Miller Gray
- Born: July 19, 1850; Echo Bank Cemetery, Edinburgh, Scotland
- Died: March 22, 1894 (aged 43); Edinburgh
- Resting place: Newington, Edinburgh

John Miller Gray (1850–1894) was a Scottish art critic and the first curator of the Scottish National Portrait Gallery.

== History ==
John Miller Gray was born on 19 July 1850 in Edinburgh, his father a shawl manufacturer who was bankrupted in 1857, his mother dying at his birth. He attended Mr. Munro's school in Newington (Archibald Munro; 1823–1898) and Munro's Clare Hall Academy in Edinburgh, but was forced aged 16 to finish his education and take up work as an apprentice bank clerk at the Bank of Scotland, where he remained for 18 years. Although he detested the work, in his spare time he educated himself about art and worked as a critic. He was particularly influenced by the art critic and writer Walter Pater, with whom he corresponded as well as reviewing some of Pater's work including Marius the Epicurean.

Gray was friendly with a number of prominent artists and public figures, including artists William Bell Scott and Phoebe Anna Traquair, and physician and writer John Brown. In 1884 he was appointed first curator of the new Scottish National Portrait Gallery, initially at temporary premises and later in Robert Rowand Anderson's Queen Street building, which opened in 1889.

He wrote regularly for periodicals including Academy and the Edinburgh Evening Courant and was chief art critic of the Scottish Leader. His publications included an 1880 book on Scottish artist George Manson and several essays on the iconography of Robert Burns. His two-volume Memoir and Remains was posthumously published by David Douglas in Edinburgh in 1895.

He died on 22 March 1894 of a brain haemorrhage, shortly before his 44th birthday, and was buried at Echo Bank cemetery in Newington, Edinburgh. He left most of his estate to the Gallery.

A portrait of John Miller Gray by Patrick William Adam is in the collection of the Scottish National Portrait Gallery (see Gallery).

== Gallery ==
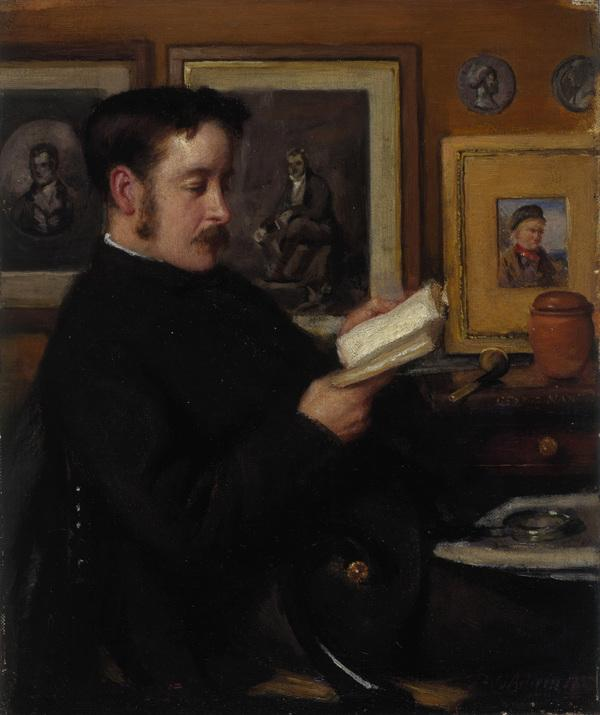
1885:
Portrait of John Miller Gray (1850–1894), art critic and first curator of the Scottish National Portrait Gallery, painted in oil on canvas by Patrick William Adam (1852–1929), a member of the Royal Scottish Academy (RSA). Housed at the National Galleries of Scotland.

== Bibliography ==
=== References ===
- Caw, James Lewis. "Gray, John Miller". In Lee, Sidney Lazarus Lee (ed.). Dictionary of National Biography: Supplement. London: Smith, Elder, & Co. Retrieved March 13, 2025.
1. Vol. 2: "Chippendale–Hoste". 1901. pp. 347–348. LCCN 2001-522502.
  1. Via Internet Archive (Robarts Library).
  2. Via Wikisource (Robarts Library).
2. Vol. 22 (of 22). 1998. pp. 772–773. LCCN 00-694539.
  1. Via Internet Archive (Sauk Valley C.C.).
- Crawford, Robert (2013). On Glasgow and Edinburgh. Harvard University Press. p. 115. ISBN 978-0-6740-6727-1 – via Google Books.
- Cumming, Elizabeth (née Moss) (2005) [1993, 2022]. Phoebe Anna Traquair: 1852–1936. Edinburgh: National Galleries of Scotland. ISBN 9-781-9032-7865-9, 1-9032-7865-1, ISBN 9-781-9016-6398-3, 1-9016-6398-1, ISBN 9-781-9110-5443-6 (paperback); OCLC 57639717 (all editions).
1. Via Internet Archive.
- "Deaths" – "Gray". The Morning Post. No. 38001. London. March 28, 1894. p. 1.

See The Morning Post

1. Via Newspapers.com.
- "Education: Clare Hall Academy". Caledonian Mercury. No. 23741. Edinburgh. July 31, 1865. p. 1 (column 5).
1. Via Newspapers.com.
- "John Miller Gray". National Galleries of Scotland. Scottish National Portrait Gallery.
- Seiler, Robert Morris (1995). Walter Pater: The Critical Heritage. Routledge. p. 120. ISBN 978-0-4151-3394-4.
