= Percy Portsmouth =

Late British sculpture

Percival ("Percy") Herbert Portsmouth RSA FRSBS (1874–1953) was a 20th-century British sculptor. His most notable public work is Elgin War Memorial, and the similar War Memorial in Thurso.

== Life ==
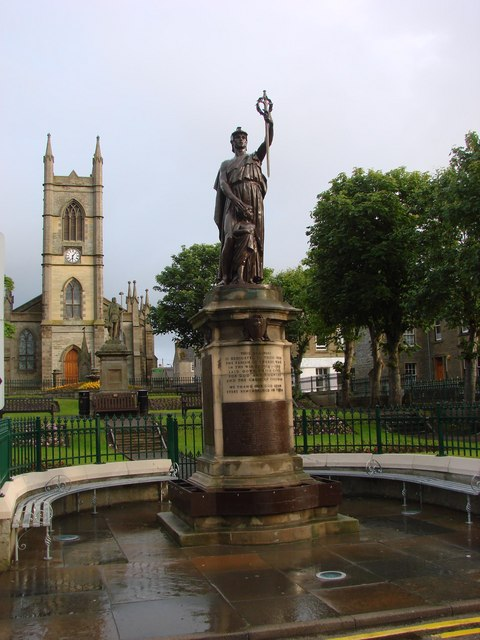
Thurso War Memorial

He was born in Reading, England, in 1874, the son of Robert John Portsmouth, a blacksmith from Southampton. he was raised and educated here. In 1891 he was living with his parents at 28 Orts Road in Reading, a very ordinary "two up, two down" terraced house.

Sometime around 1893 he moved to London (probably to study) and was living at 11 Lincoln Street in Chelsea before moving to 21 Guildford Street in Clapham in 1902.

Around August 1903, shortly after marrying, he got a job teaching sculpture at Edinburgh College of Art and moved to 65 Warrender Park Road in the Marchmont district. He lived briefly at 10 Viewforth Square, before returning to Marchmont in 1905 to 40 Warrender Park Terrace. During this period he also leased a studio at Westhall Gardens in the south of the city.

In 1910 he was living at 39 George Square, Edinburgh.

As was common to all reasonably skilled sculptors the First World War was a blessing in disguise as the post-war legislation legally obliged every parish council across the length and breadth of Britain to erect a war memorial to their dead. He received three major commissions from this. As these are all remote from his home he presumably had a friend or relative who promoted him for these commissions.

In 1929 he retired as Professor of Sculpture at Edinburgh College of Art and moved to England where he lived at "Youngloves" in Rushden, Hertfordshire.

He died at Lister Hospital in Hitchin on 29 October 1953.

== Family ==
In 1903 he married Kate Emma Pope of Lambeth in south London. The couple lived briefly at the parental home 40 Wilkinson Street in Lambeth before moving to Edinburgh.

== Known works ==
- Monument to William John Kennedy, Glasgow Necropolis (1904)
- The Captive (1908)
- Remorse (1908)
- Bust of David Young Cameron (1914)
- In Memoriam (1919)
- Miranda (1921)
- Elgin War Memorial (1921)
- Lossiemouth War Memorial (1922)
- Thurso War Memorial (c.1922)
- Wick War Memorial (c.1923)
- War Memorial in Castletown, Caithness (1922)
- "Survival of the Spirit" panel on the Scottish National War Memorial (1927)
- Labour (1938)
