= Thomas Corsan Morton =

Scottish painter (1859–1928)

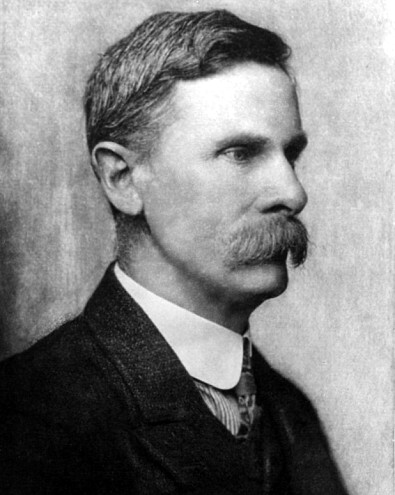
- Morton around 1890
- Born: 6 December 1859; Glasgow, Scotland
- Died: 24 December 1928 (aged 69); Kirkcaldy, Scotland

Thomas Corsan Morton (6 December 1859 – 24 December 1928) was a Scottish artist, known as one of the Glasgow Boys.

== Life ==
Born in Glasgow, Morton worked briefly in a lawyer's office, and went to the city's School of Art. After a period at the Slade School in London, he studied in Paris under Gustave Boulanger and Jules Joseph Lefebvre. He exhibited widely in the UK and beyond, often in exhibitions with work by other members of the Glasgow School, including Secessionist exhibitions in Munich in the 1890s.

Morton was primarily a landscape artist. Some of his work came from summer painting trips with others of the "Boys". These included stays in Kirkcudbright and in Cockburnspath, James Guthrie's home, in the 1880s.

He taught landscape painting at the Glasgow School of Art, and assisted Francis Newbery with the life drawing classes.

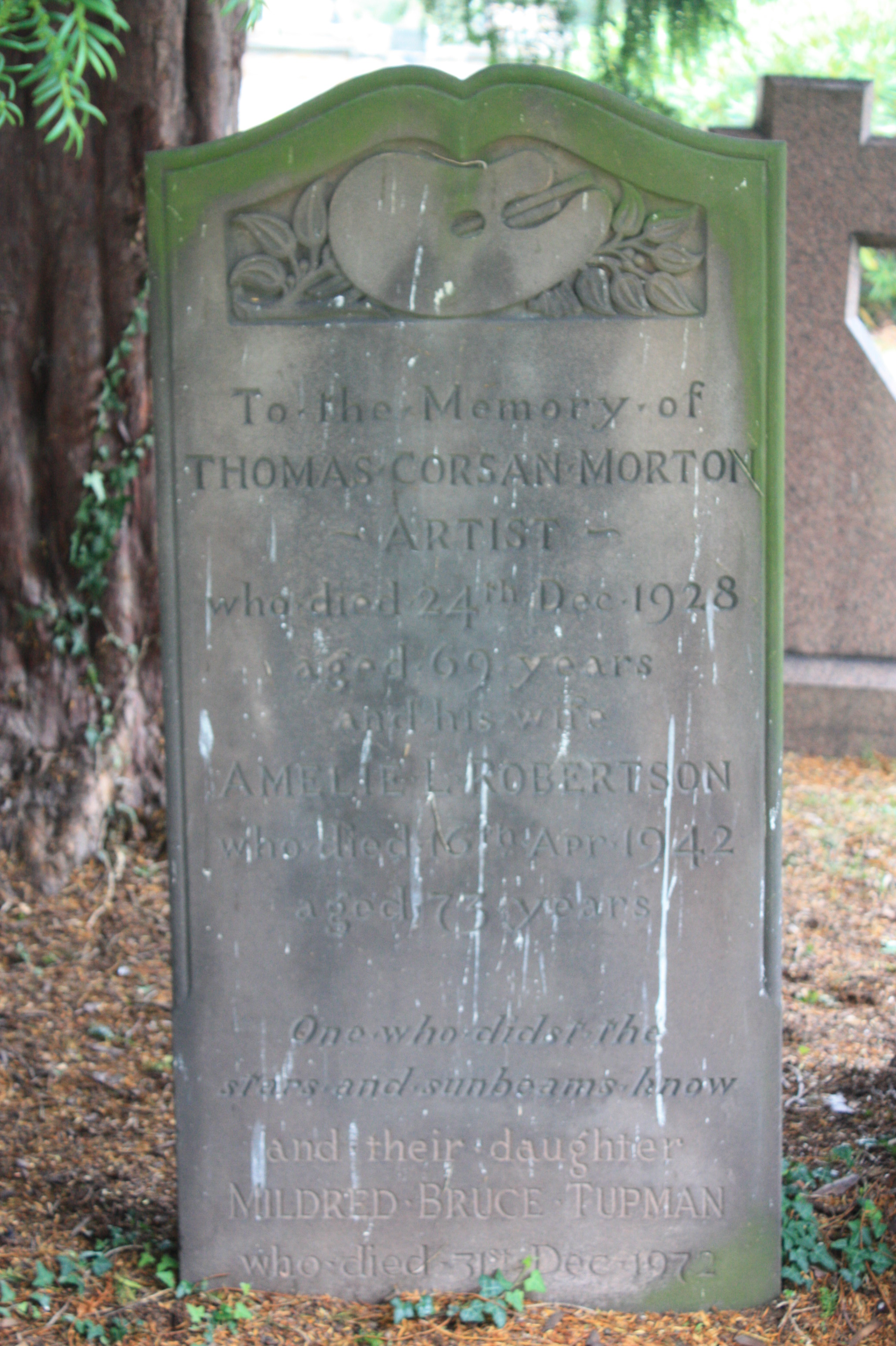
The grave of Thomas Corsan Morton, Dean Cemetery

His first one-man-show was organised in November 1894 at the gallery of Alexander Reid at 124 St Vincent Street in central Glasgow.

In May 1908, he was appointed Keeper of the Scottish National Gallery in Edinburgh. He moved to 7 Comiston Road in the south of the city. After retiring from that post in 1925 he became Curator of the newly established Art Gallery in Kirkcaldy, where he died in December 1928.

He is buried in the Dean Cemetery, Edinburgh with his wife Amelie Robertson (1869-1942), whom he had married in 1890, and their daughter Mildred Bruce Tupman (d.1972). The grave lies to the north of the southern path, near to that of Henry Snell Gamley.

== Known works ==
- Road at Bridge of Allan (1917)
- Woods in Autumn
- James Morton, MD, President of the Royal College of Physicians and Surgeons of Glasgow
- Souvenir de Manet Kelvingrove Art Gallery
- Sunny Woodlands Kirkcaldy Art Gallery
- Landscape with Cattle Kirkcaldy Art Gallery
- Jean Armour Burns, Burns Museum
- A Cathedral City - Durham
- The Wood-Cutter (1887)
- Daffodils (1888)
- Still Life: Roses and Oranges
- Still Life with Forsythia

== Gallery ==
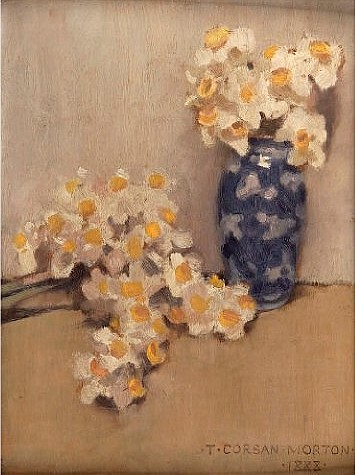
Thomas Corsan Morton - Daffodils (1888)

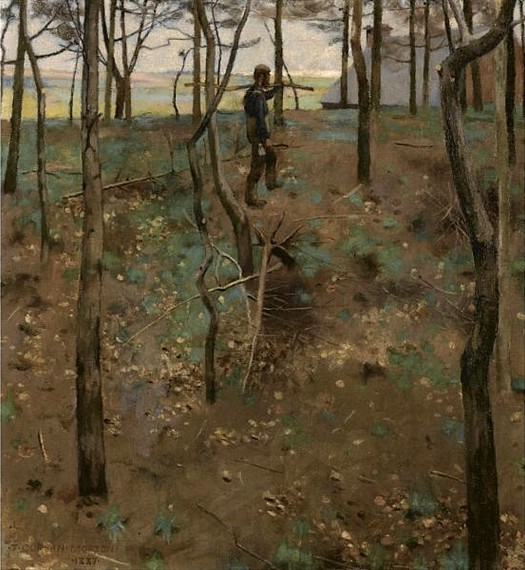
Thomas Corsan Morton - The Woodcutter 1887

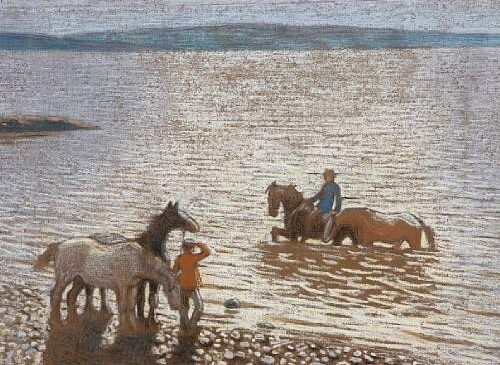
Sun glitter on the Forth

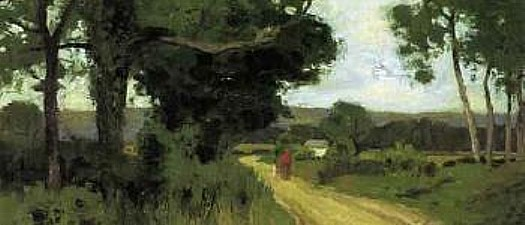
Thomas Corsan Morton - Mother and child on country lane
