= William York Macgregor =

Scottish landscape painter (1855–1923)

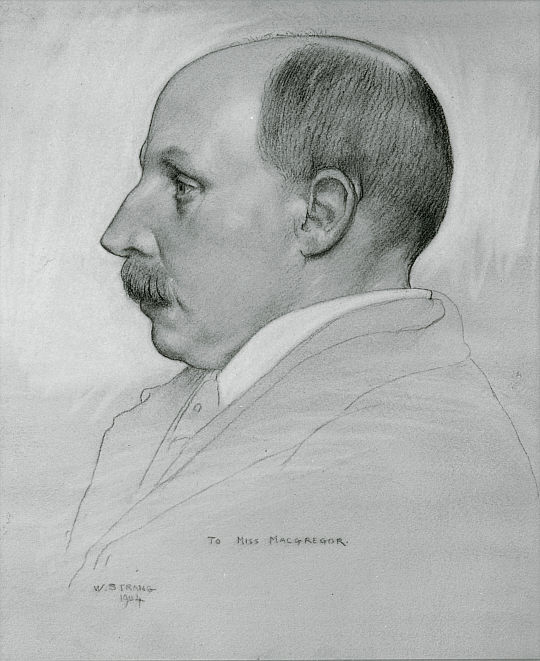
- Portrait by William Strang, 1904
- Born: 14 October 1855; Finnart House, Dunbartonshire, Scotland
- Died: 28 September 1923 (aged 67); Oban, Argyll, Scotland
- Resting place: Bridge of Allan, Stirling, Scotland
- Education: Slade School of Fine Art; Royal Scottish Academy
- Known for: Pioneering the Glasgow School
- Style: Realism, impressionism
- Parents: John Macgregor (father); Margaret York (mother)

William York MacGregor (14 October 1855 – 28 September 1923) was a Scottish landscape painter, and leading figure of the Glasgow Boys.

== Life ==
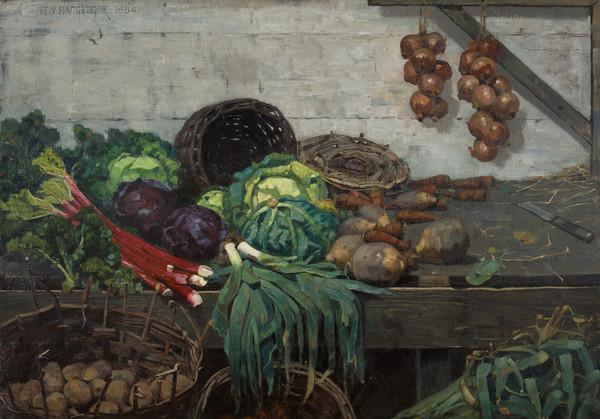
The Vegetable Stall

He was the son of the affluent Glasgow shipbuilder John Macgregor by his second wife, Margaret York.

Macgregor studied in Glasgow under Robert Greenlees and James Docharty and at the Slade School under Alphonse Legros. He joined former schoolfriend James Paterson (1854–1932) in 1878 and they co-founded the "Glasgow School" meeting at his studio; 134 Bath Street in central Glasgow.

He exhibited at the Royal Scottish Academy from 1875 (Associate R.S.A. 1898; R.S.A. 1921) and twice at the Royal Academy, was a member of the R.S.W.S. 1885–1906 and the New English Art Club in 1892. Macgregor travelled widely on the Continent 1886–90. A member of Glasgow Art Club, work by Macgregor was included in the club's Memorial Exhibition in April 1935, in memory of those of its members who had died since the First World War.

He lived his final years at Albyn Lodge in Bridge of Allan. Macgregor died in Oban on 28 September 1923, and is buried in Old Logie Kirkyard east of Bridge of Allan. The graveyard lies a few hundred metres north of the modern Logie Cemetery.

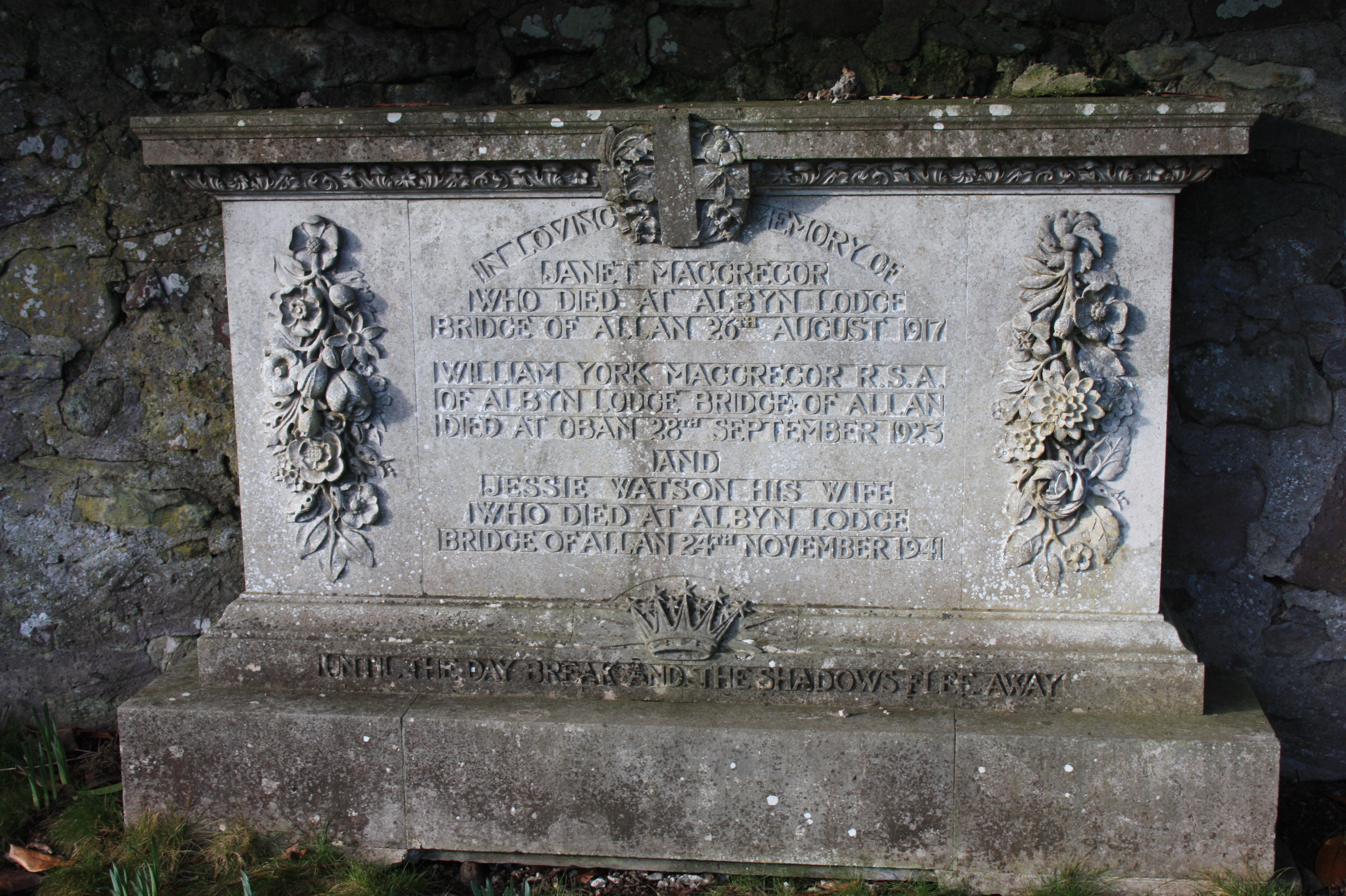
The grave of William York Macgregor, Old Logie Kirkyard

== Family ==
He was married to Jessie Watson (died 1941).
