= Robert Gemmell Hutchison =

Scottish artist (1855–1936)

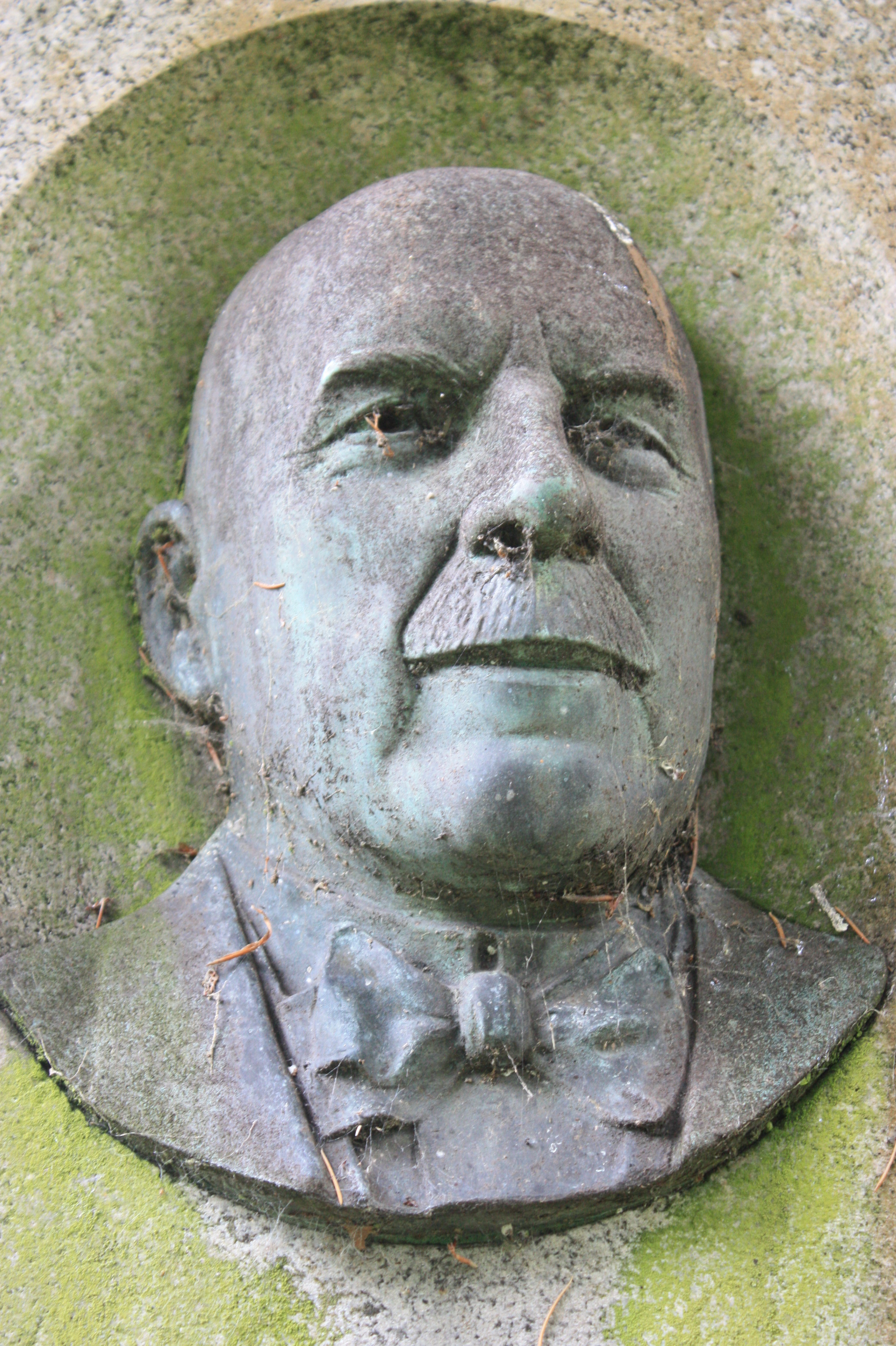
Robert Gemmell Hutchison

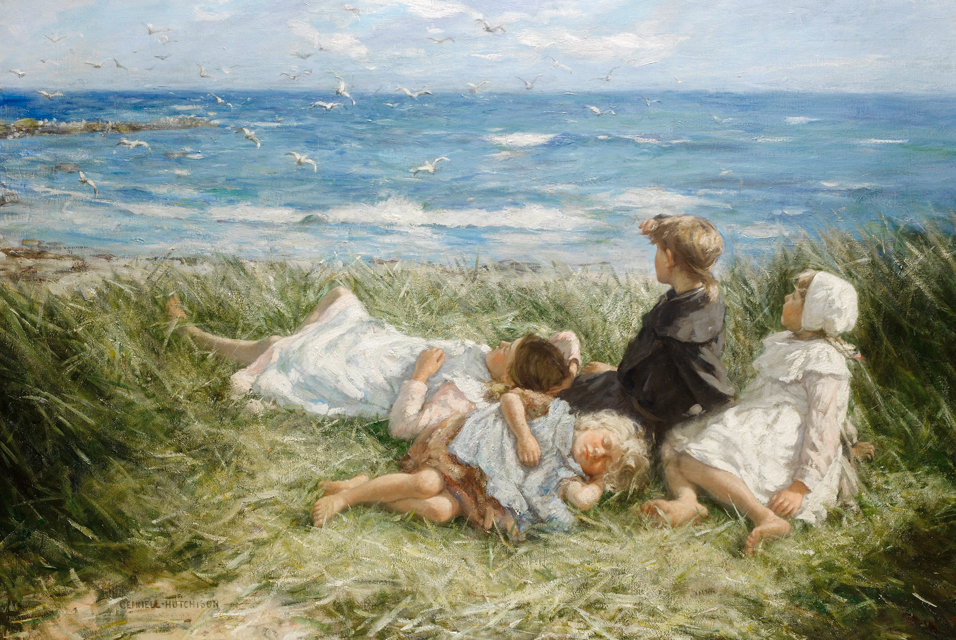
Sea Gulls and Sapphire Seas’ by Robert Gemmell Hutchison

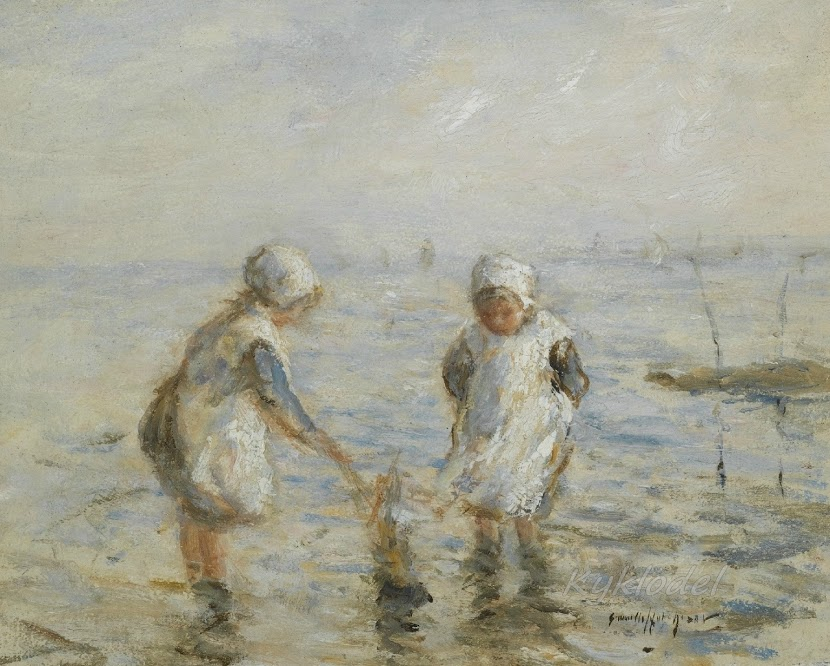
The Toy Boat by Robert Gemmell Hutchison

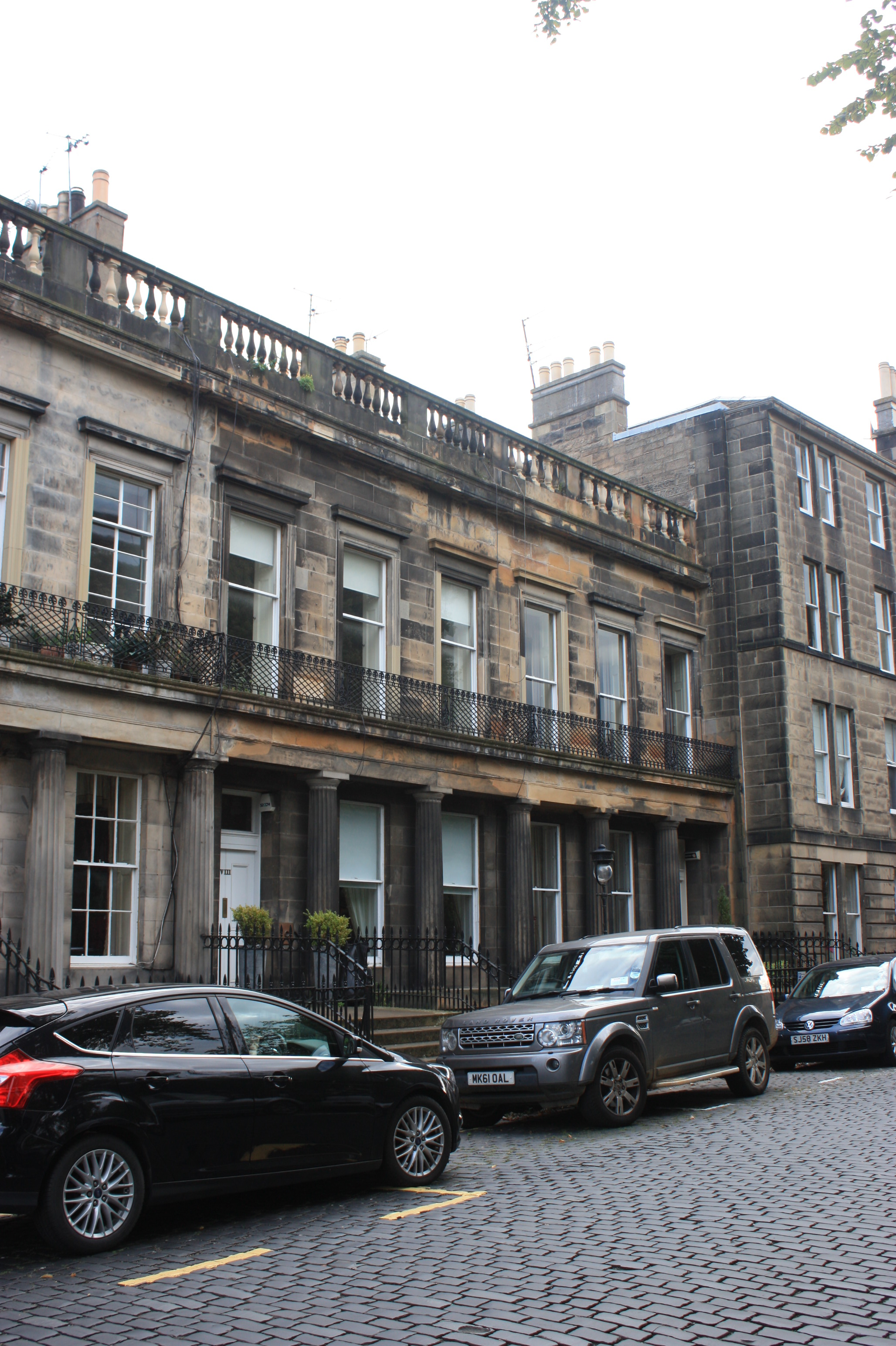
8 St Bernard's Crescent, Edinburgh

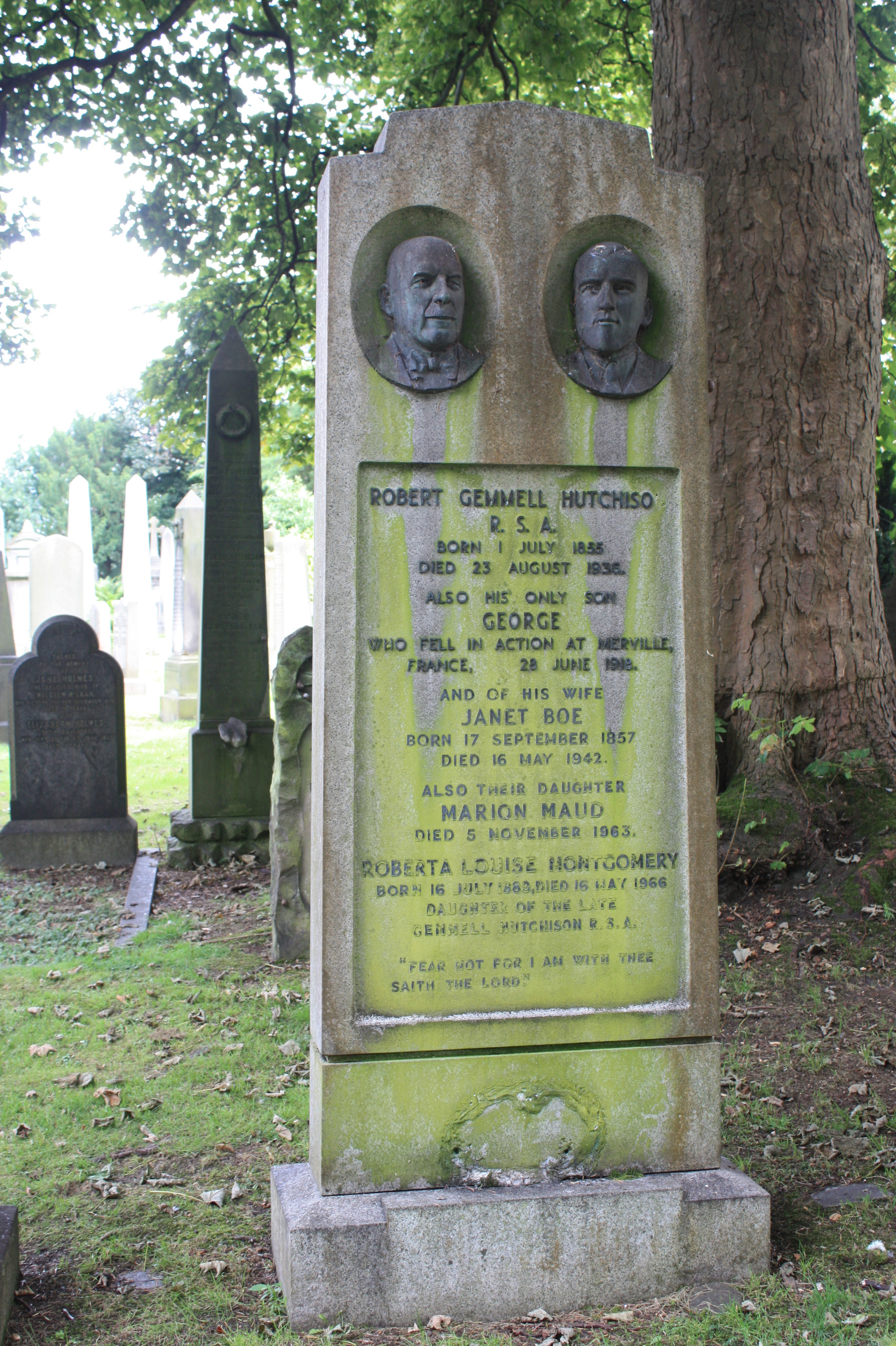
The grave of Robert Gemmell Hutchison, Dean Cemetery

Robert Gemmell Hutchison RSA RSW (1855–1936) was a Scottish landscape artist, specialising in coastal scenes. He belongs to the school of British Impressionism.

== Life ==
He was born in Edinburgh on 1 July 1855 the first son of George Hutchison, a brass-founder, and his wife Margaret Forman. He was educated in Edinburgh. After first training as a seal-engraver he was encouraged to pursue oil painting and trained under James Campbell Noble at the Trustees Academy on Picardy Place. He set up his own studio at 1 India Buildings (at the top of Victoria Street) in 1878 and was instantly successful, exhibiting at the Royal Scottish Academy in 1879 and at the Royal Academy in 1881. He shifted quickly from empty seascapes, largely of the Fife coast, to genre paintings, usually of young girls sitting on the coast.

He was elected an associate of the Royal Scottish Academy in 1903 and a full member in 1911. He was also elected to the Royal Society of British Artists, the Royal Institute of Oil Painters and the Royal Scottish Society of Painters in Watercolour. His first one-man show in London was in December 1928 at Barbizon House, when 34 of his pictures were displayed. In later life he lived at 14 Craighall Terrace in Musselburgh, east of Edinburgh. He returned to Edinburgh in 1912, living at 8 St Bernards Crescent in the Stockbridge area. In the 1930s he spent time with his daughter at her home in Coldingham, painting at St. Abbs. He died at his daughter’s house on 22 August 1936.

He is buried in Dean Cemetery on one of the curving paths to the south-west. His portrait is sculpted on the memorial by John Stevenson Rhind.

== Known works ==
- Playing on the Rocks, Carnoustie, Dundee University
- The Empty Cradle (1880)
- The Pathos of Life (1884), oil on canvas, 122 × 182.9 cm
- Boys Guddling Trout (1886)
- Halloween (1896), exhibited at the Royal Scottish Academy 70th exhibition
- The Gundy Man (1897) Dundee City Art Collection
- Village Carnival (1898), oil on canvas, 114 × 157 cm, © The Drambuie Collection, Edinburgh (bought by Sir Edward Moss)
- Bairnies Cuddle Doon (1900), for which he won a gold medal at the Paris Salon (bought by the Modern Arts Association), given to the Serjeant Gallery at Wanganui, New Zealand in 1947
- Seagulls and Sapphire Seas (1909), 106 × 166 cm, sold to Bolton Museum and Art Gallery by the artist in 1912 for £150, sold by Bonhams for £120,000 in 2011
- The Breezy Bents (1910)
- A Song of the Sea (1912)
- Shifting Shadows (1913)
- L’Ouevre de Passe (1914)
- The White Seam (1928) (Paisley Art Museum)
- The Young Arcadians
- The Tin Whistle, oil on board, 10 × 14 inches
- Reflections (bought by the Royal Scottish Academy in 1932)
- Children Looking over a Fence (British Art – Mia Feigelson Gallery Children in Art – Mia Feigelson Gallery, oil on canvas; 40.8 x 30.5 cm (15.7 x 12 in.) © Perth & Kinross Council, Scotland; Bequeathed by Robert Brough, 1926;

At the time of his death, works had been purchased by art galleries in Liverpool, Oldham, Glasgow, Bolton, Toronto, Blackpool, the Hamilton Trust, and the Fine Art Association of Canada. An unspecified work by Hutchison was sold by Sotheby's for £32,000 in August 2001; the expected price was £10,000 to £15,000.

== Family ==
In 1879 he married Janet Boe (1857–1942), a grocer's daughter from Biggar, South Lanarkshire. They had four daughters and three sons.

His son, George Jackson Hutchison (1896–1918) was also an artist, as was his daughter Marion ‘Maud’ Gemmell Hutchison (1887–1963). George was killed serving in the First World War. Maud would live and work at Craighall Terrace, Inveresk, Musselburgh and exhibit with the Academy in Edinburgh in 1909.
