= James Cadenhead =

Scottish painter (1858–1927)

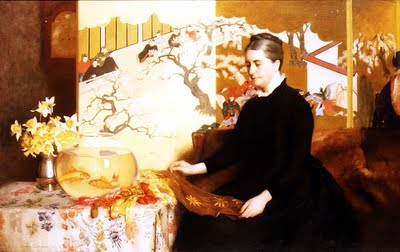
Lady with Japanese Screen and Goldfish (1886)

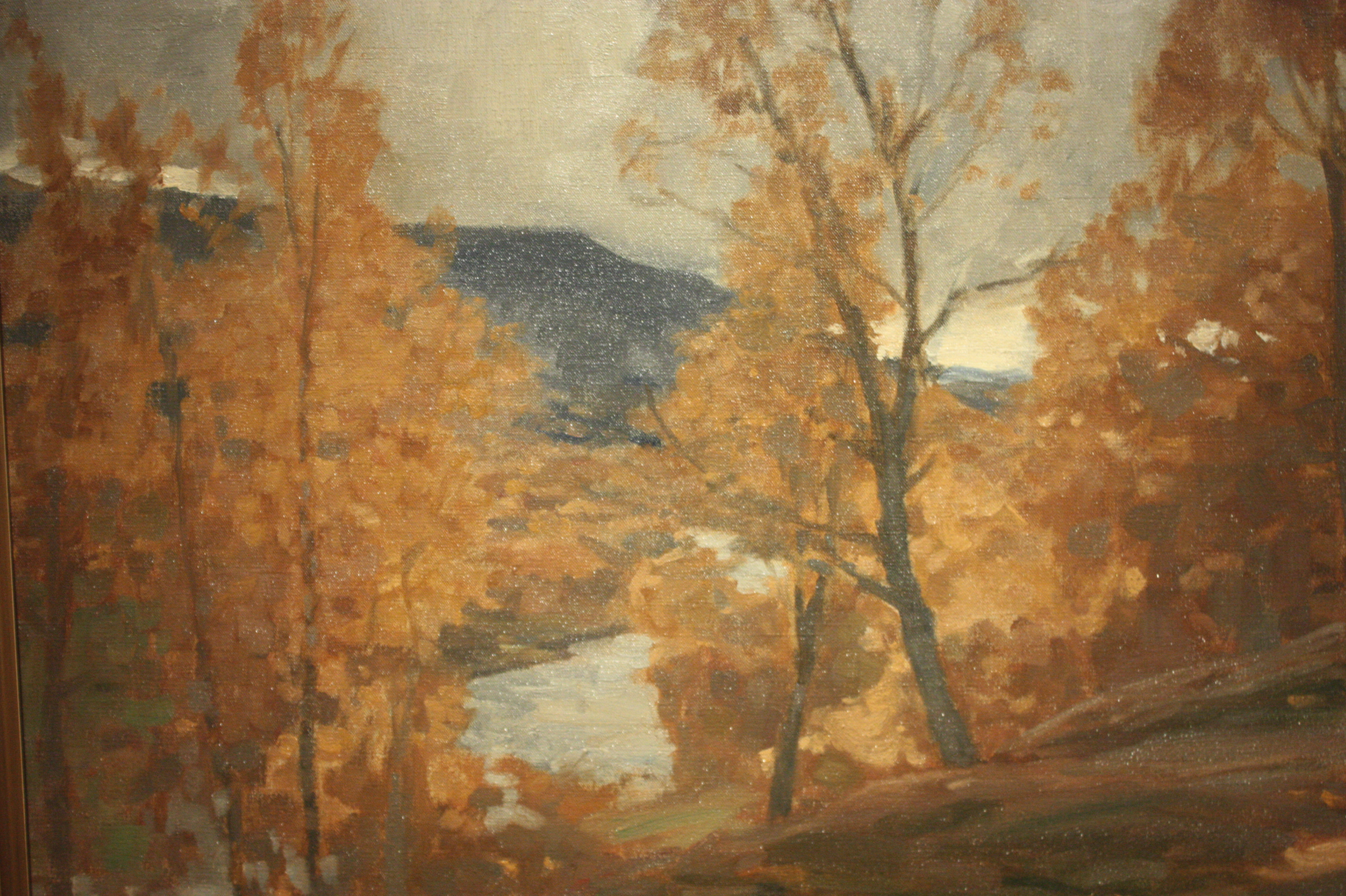
Deeside by James Cadenhead

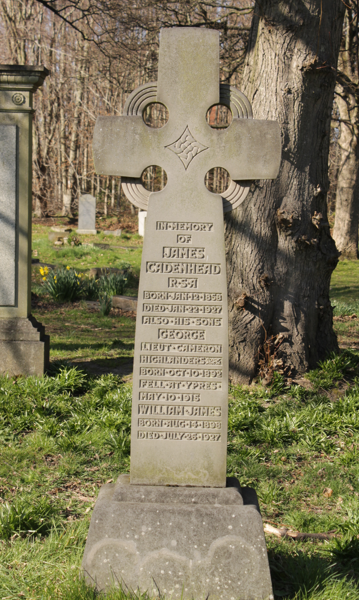
The grave of James Cadenhead in Warriston cemetery

James Cadenhead ARSA (12 January 1858 – 22 January 1927) was a Scottish landscape and portrait painter.

== Life and work ==
Cadenhead was born in Aberdeen, the only son of George Cadenhead, advocate and Procurator Fiscal for the city, living at 7 Springbank Terrace.

James received his early training in art in Aberdeen, showing an aptitude for pencil drawing, etching and portraiture. He was encouraged in his art endeavours by Dr. John Forbes White (art collector and photographer, and brother-in-law of surgeon and photographer, Thomas Keith) who aroused his interest in the old masters, and artists of the French Barbizon and modern Dutch schools. He went on to the Royal Scottish Academy schools in Edinburgh, then, in 1882, to Paris to study at the atelier of Carolus-Duran. There he was also strongly influenced by the work of Jean-Charles Cazin (1840–1901).

Cadenhead returned to Aberdeen in 1884, moving to Edinburgh in 1891. In 1893, he was elected a member of the Royal Scottish Society of Painters in Watercolour, and in 1902 was made an Associate of the Royal Scottish Academy, and later a full member. He became Chairman of the Society of Scottish Artists, and was one of the original committee of the Scottish Modern Arts Association. He was a founder of the Edinburgh Society of Eight in 1912. He exhibited regularly at the Royal Scottish Academy and Royal Glasgow Institute of the Fine Arts, and was elected a Scottish Royal Academician in 1921.

Amongst his portraits is one of his mother entitled Lady with Japanese Screen and Goldfish (1886; City Art Gallery, Edinburgh). Cadenhead lived at 14 Ramsay Garden: in the artistic and intellectual colony established by Patrick Geddes close to Edinburgh Castle at the top of the Royal Mile. He was closely associated with Geddes' Fin de Siècle Scottish cultural revival, contributing illustrations to all four volumes of The Evergreen: A Northern Seasonal published by Patrick Geddes and Colleagues between 1895 and 1897, and painting coloured frescoes in the Edinburgh Room at the Outlook Tower. He also took the role of Fionn mac Cumhaill in the Celtic section of the Scottish National Pageant staged in Edinburgh, at Aberdour Castle and at the University of Glasgow in 1908.

In later life he lived at 15 Inverleith Terrace in north Edinburgh, his neighbour at 13 being fellow-artist William Hole.

He died in Edinburgh in 1927. He is buried in Warriston Cemetery on the upper east-west path, near the East Gate.
