= Naismith =

Naismith, Nasmith, Nasmyth, Naysmith or Naesmith may refer to:

== General ==
- Naismith's Rule, used in hiking
- Nasmyth telescope
- Primary enamel cuticle, also known as Nasmyth's membrane

== Places ==
- Naismith, Montana
- Nasmyth (crater) on the Moon

== Companies ==
- McClure Naismith, Scottish commercial solicitors
- Nasmyth, Gaskell and Company (1836–1850), production of heavy machine tools and locomotives, later James Nasmyth and Company (1850–1857), Patricroft Ironworks (1857–1867), Nasmyth, Wilson and Company (1867–1940)

== People ==
Naismith (Nasmith, Nasmyth, Naysmith) is an occupational surname for a cutler, and may refer to:

=== Naismith ===
- Alby Naismith (1917–1981), Australian rules footballer
- Charlie Naismith (1881–unknown), Australian rules footballer
- James Naismith (1861–1939), Canadian-American sports coach and innovator, inventor of basketball
- James Naismith (chemist) (born 1968), chemical biologist
- Jason Naismith (born 1994), Scottish footballer
- Jon Naismith (born 1965), British television producer
- Joseph Nasmith (1850–1904), British consulting engineer and author
- Kal Naismith (born 1992), Scottish footballer
- Laurence Naismith (1908–1992), English actor
- Lindley Naismith, New Zealand architect
- Sharon Naismith, Australian clinical neuropsychologist
- Steven Naismith (born 1986), Scottish footballer
- Wally Naismith (1881–1954), Australian rules footballer
- William W. Naismith (1856–1935), Scottish mountaineer

=== Nasmith ===
- David Nasmith (1799–1839), founder of the City Mission Movement
- David Dunbar-Nasmith (1921–1997), Royal Navy admiral
- James Nasmith (1740–1808), English clergyman, academic and antiquary
- James Dunbar-Nasmith (1927–2023), British conservation architect
- Martin Nasmith, later Martin Dunbar-Nasmith (1883–1965), Royal Navy admiral, recipient of the Victoria Cross
- Ted Nasmith (born 1950s), Canadian artist, illustrator and architectural renderer

=== Nasmyth ===
- Sir James Nasmyth, 1st Baronet (died 1720), Scottish lawyer
- Sir James Nasmyth, 2nd Baronet (c. 1704–1779), Scottish botanist and politician, son of 1st Baronet
- Alexander Nasmyth (1758–1840), Scottish portrait and landscape painter, father of Anne, Barbara, Charlotte, James, Jane and Patrick
- Jane Nasmyth (1787–1867), Scottish landscape painter, daughter of Alexander
- Barbara Nasmyth (1790–1870), Scottish painter, daughter of Alexander
- Anne Nasmyth (1798–1874), Scottish painter, daughter of Alexander
- Charlotte Nasmyth (1804–1884), Scottish painter, daughter of Alexander
- James Nasmyth (1808–1890), Scottish engineer, inventor of the steam hammer and the Nasmyth telescope, son of Alexander
- Patrick Nasmyth (1787–1831), Scottish landscape painter, son of Alexander
- Thomas Goodall Nasmyth (1855–1937), Scottish physician, medical author and historian
- Beatrice Nasmyth (1885–1977), Canadian suffragette and war correspondent
- Kim Nasmyth (born 1952), British biochemistry professor

=== Naysmith ===
- Doug Naysmith (born 1941), British politician
- John Murray Naysmith, garden designer, including York Museum Gardens
- Gary Naysmith (born 1978), Scottish footballer

=== Naesmith ===
- Andrew Naesmith (1888-1961), British trade unionist

== See also ==
- Naismith College Player of the Year, for basketball
- Naismith Prep Player of the Year Award, for basketball
- Nesmith (disambiguation)
