= Margaret Nasmyth =

Scottish painter (1791–1869)

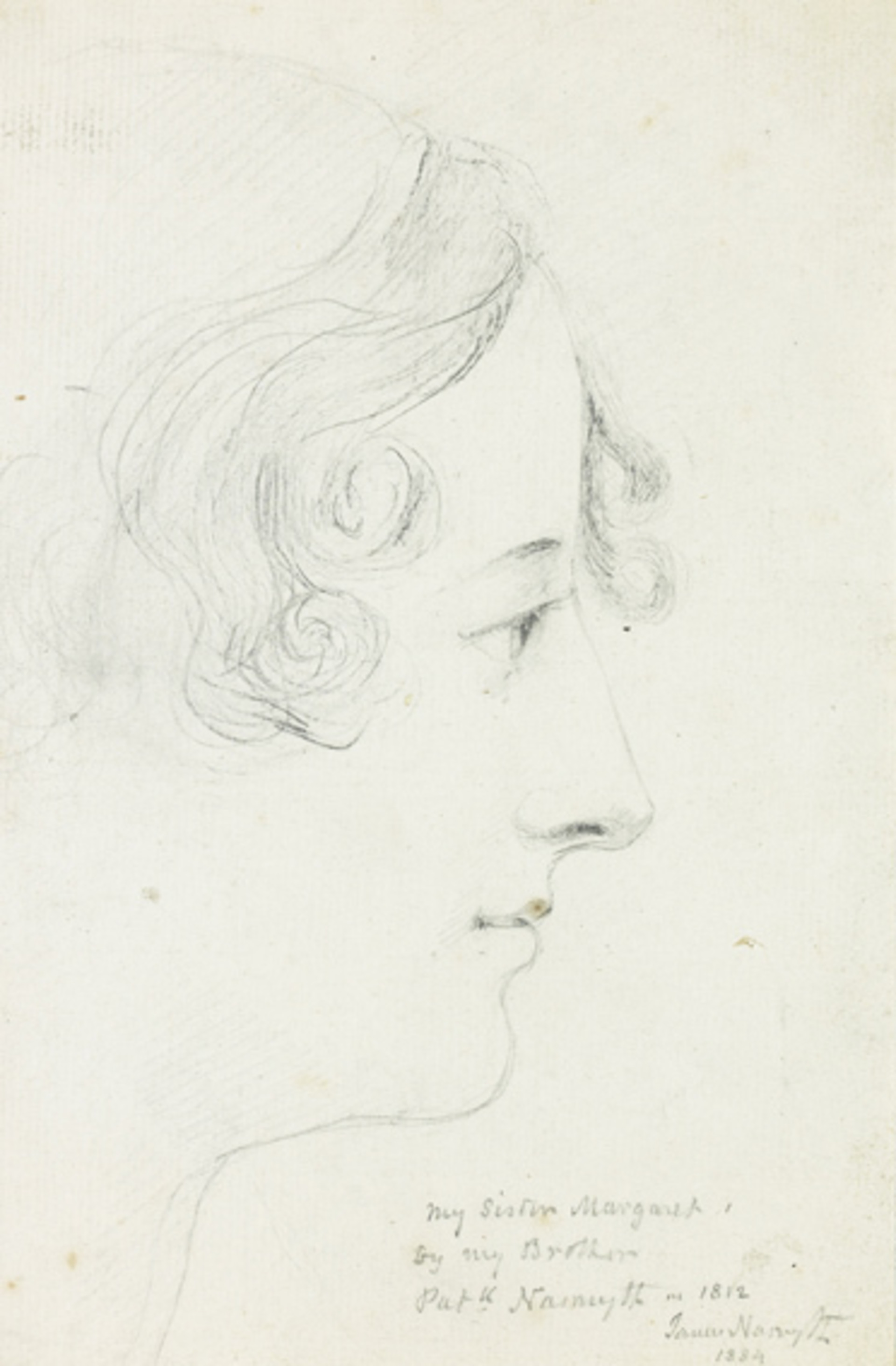
- Margaret, aged about 21, as sketched by her brother Patrick in 1812
- Born: 11 April 1791
- Died: 3 November 1869 (aged 77)

Margaret Nasmyth (1791–1869) was a Scottish landscape painter.

== Early life ==
Margaret Nasmyth was born on 11 April 1791 in Hill Street, St Andrew's parish, Edinburgh, into the distinguished Nasmyth family of painters and art teachers. Her father Alexander Nasmyth and six of her siblings—Jane, Barbara, Elizabeth, Anne, Charlotte, and Patrick—were all notable artists.

== Style ==
Margaret imitated her father in style, but like Barbara she also practiced the more detailed, minute brushwork of her brother Patrick. Margaret left her father's house in 1836 to dwell with her brothers James and George, at Green Lane House, Patricroft, Manchester. She did not exhibit until 1841 at the age of fifty, by which date the whole family had come to live with James, when presumably she had more leisure time to devote to painting.

She travelled widely, drawing subjects from across Scotland, Cumberland, Lancashire, north Wales, Shropshire, Westmorland, Cheshire, Blackford Heath, and Chigwell, Essex.

== Exhibits ==
She exhibited at the Royal Society of British Artists (1841– 65), the Royal Scottish Academy (1830–61), the Royal Hibernian Academy (1843) and the Royal Glasgow Institute (1862–66).

She died at Stanhope Villas on 3 November 1869.

== Works ==
Her technique is fine and detailed, and she expended much care on all aspects of her paintings. Fine examples are Lake Scene and View of Kinfauns Castle Perthshire. She signed her work 'Margaret Nasmyth' in the bottom left-hand corner in a large, clear hand; or sometimes 'MN' with the date, in the bottom right-hand corner.
