= Elizabeth Nasmyth =

Scottish designer

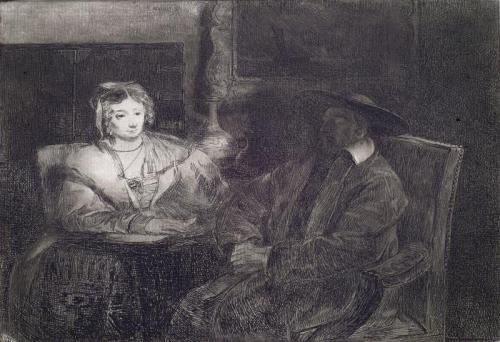
- Elizabeth with her first husband Andrew Terry, by Andrew Geddes (1826)
- Born: 26 August 1793; St Andrew's parish, Edinburgh
- Died: 10 July 1862 (aged 68); Putney, Surrey
- Spouses: Daniel Terry (m. 1815; died 1829); Charles Richardson (m. 1835)
- Children: 3 from first marriage

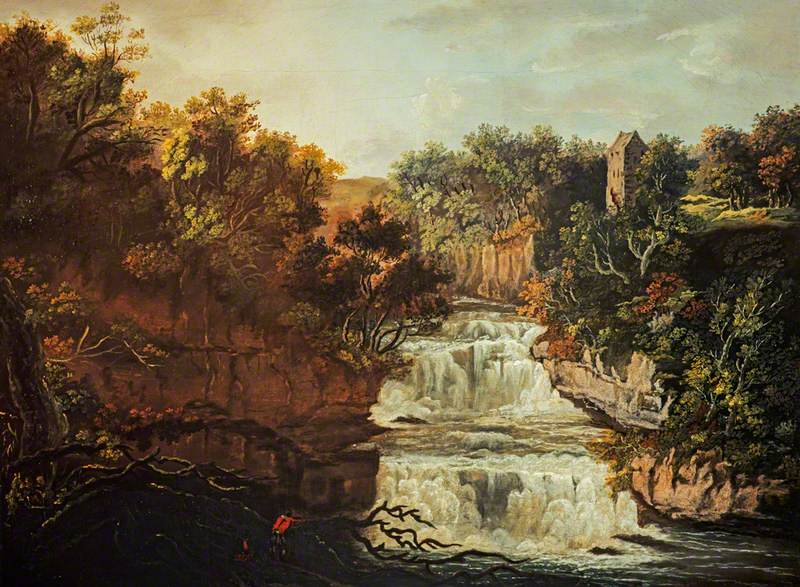
The Falls of Clyde

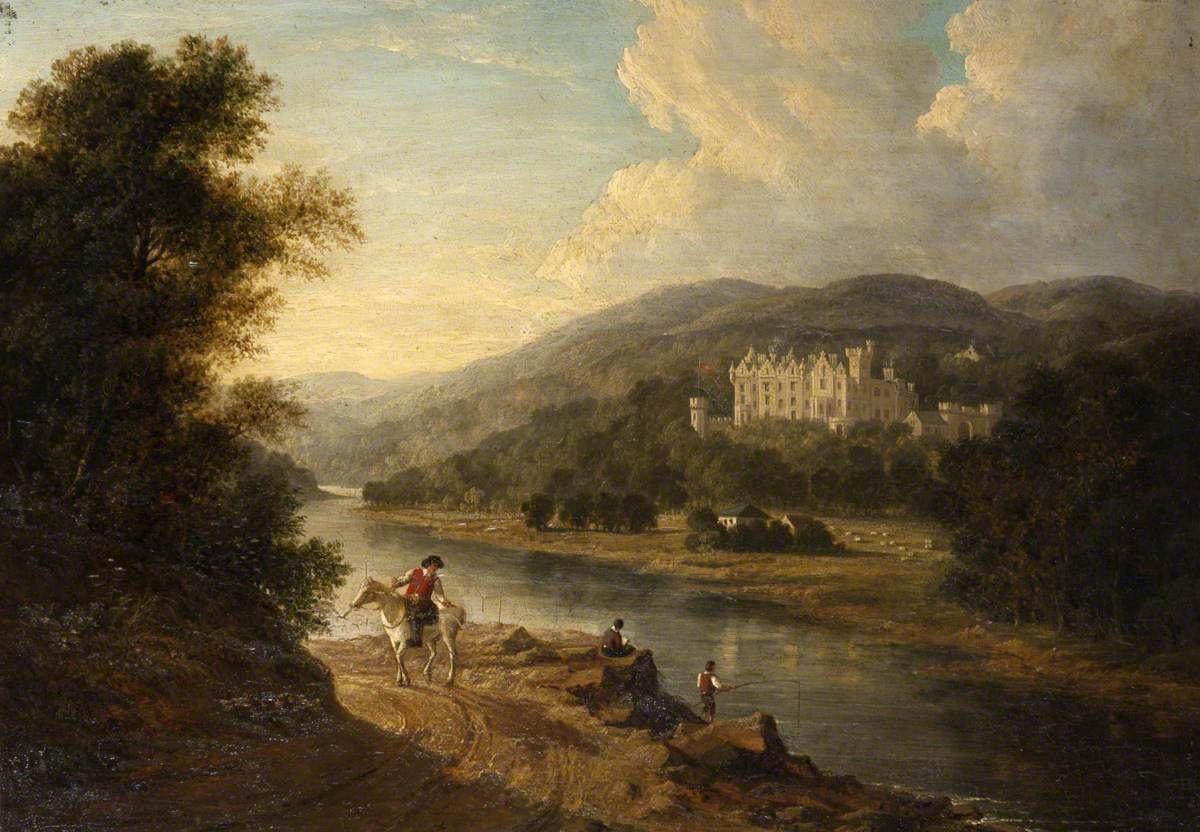
A View of Abbotsford from across the Tweed (attributed)

Elizabeth Wemyss Nasmyth (1793–1862) was a Scottish painter and interior designer.

== Life ==
=== Origins ===
Elizabeth Wemyss Nasmyth was born on 26 August 1793 in Hill Street, St Andrew's parish, Edinburgh, into the distinguished Nasmyth family of painters and art teachers. Her father Alexander Nasmyth and six of her siblings—Jane, Barbara, Margaret, Anne, Charlotte, and Patrick—were all notable artists.

=== First marriage ===
On 25 June 1815 she married the actor Daniel Terry. The marriage may have taken place rather suddenly, as Alexander Nasmyth makes no mention of any engagement in a letter to his children in Edinburgh written only a few weeks before the marriage. Elizabeth was a talented designer and through Daniel Terry's connection with Sir Walter Scott over the building of Abbotsford produced designs for Scott's armoury.

The Terrys lived in London at 9 Devonshire Street, Portland Place, where Elizabeth stored unsold paintings and helped her father to organise his affairs. She also ran art classes with her sister Anne from the house.

Letters between Daniel Terry and Scott record Elizabeth's difficulty in having children, although she eventually bore three: Walter Scott Terry (born 1816), Jane Terry (born 1821), and Elizabeth Terry (born 1822). Daniel Terry died after a long illness and financial troubles on 12 June 1829.

=== Second marriage ===
Elizabeth remarried to the lexicographer Charles Richardson on 23 May 1835. The marriage was childless.

She died at 9 Charlwood Road, Putney, Surrey, on 10 July 1862 and was interred with her second husband in Putney Lower Common Cemetery. A long epitaph on her tombstone composed by her grief-stricken husband testifies to a long and happy marriage.

== Works ==
Elizabeth continued with her painting throughout her first marriage, sending works to the British Institution from 1816 to 1829. Her style is perhaps the coldest and least painterly of the Nasmyth sisters; a rare signed example is Driving Cattle by a Loch, now in a private collection. Though identifiable as of the 'Nasmyth school', and competently finished, her work is stylistically less Romantic. This is partly because she often used bright colours, thus distinguishing her work from that of her sisters. Her pictures are typically signed on the stretcher 'Elizabeth Nasmyth'.
