= Naysmith =

Naysmith is an occupational surname for a cutler. Notable people with the surname include:

- Anne Naysmith (1937–2015), British classical pianist
- Doug Naysmith (born 1941), British Labour Co-operative politician, Member of Parliament, for Bristol North West (1997–2010)
- Gary Naysmith (born 1978), Scottish footballer
- Ryan Naysmith, character played by British actor Ricky Whittle in the Sky One football drama Dream Team
- Stuart Naysmith, fictional footballer played by Terence Meynard on Sky One's television drama Dream Team

== See also ==
- Naismith (disambiguation)
