= View of Bristol =

Painting by Patrick Nasmyth

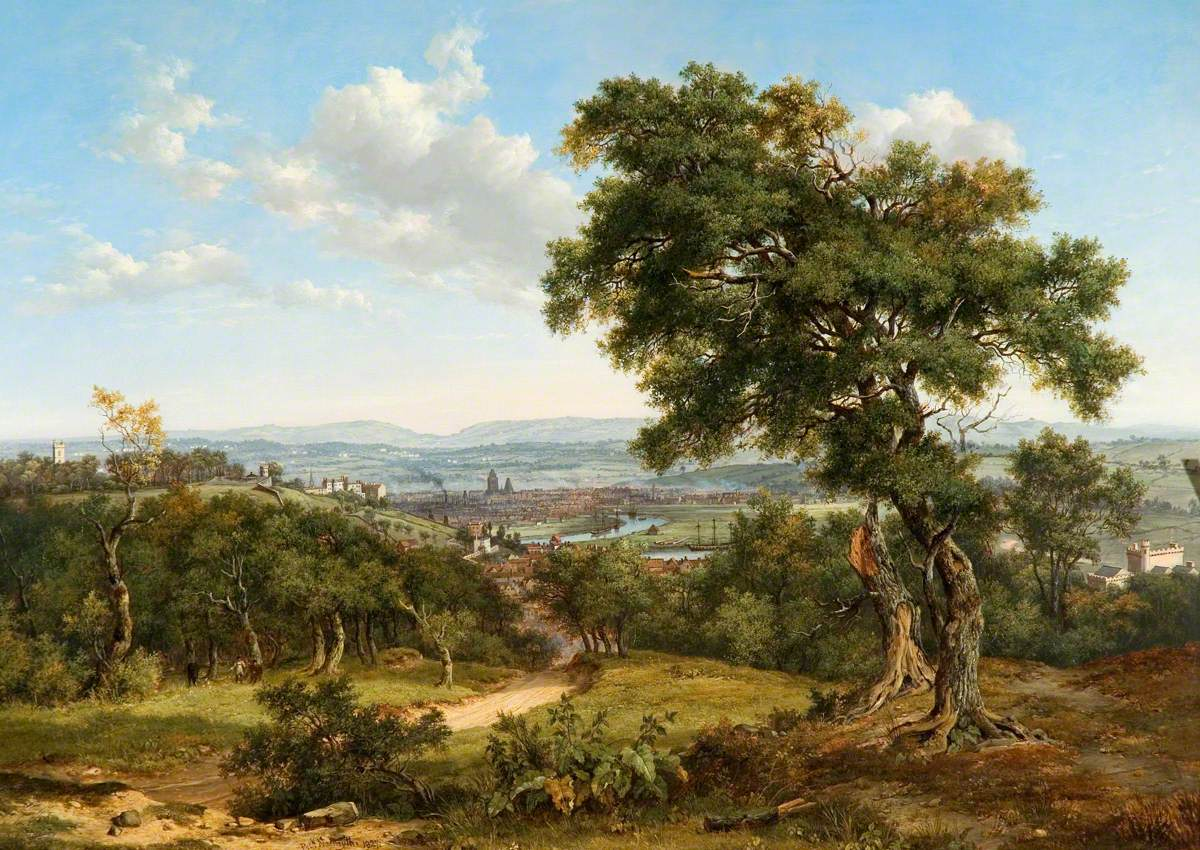
- Artist: Patrick Nasmyth
- Year: 1827
- Type: Oil on canvas, landscape painting
- Dimensions: 72.5 cm × 102.5 cm (28.5 in × 40.4 in)
- Location: Wolverhampton Art Gallery; Wolverhampton

View of Bristol is an 1827 landscape painting by the British artist Patrick Nasmyth. It depicts a panoramic view of the port city of Bristol and River Avon in the West of England. Seen from the nearby countryside it emphasises its picturesque characters rather than its industrial base. The city and its surroundings were frequently featured in Regency era paintings by members of the Bristol School, although Nasmyth was not involved with the group. A Scottish-born artist, son of the celebrated painter Alexander Nasmyth, he specialised in landscapes across Britain before his death from pneumonia in 1831. Today the painting is in the collection of the Wolverhampton Art Gallery in the West Midlands, bequeathed by Maria Christiana Cartwright in 1887.

== Bibliography ==
- Johnson, Peter & Money, Ernie. The Nasmyth family of painters. F. Lewis, 1977.
