= Nesmith =

Nesmith may refer to:

== People ==
=== Given name ===
- Nesmith Ankeny (1927–1993), American mathematician
- Clifton Nesmith McArthur, a United States Representative from Oregon

=== Surname ===
- Aaron Nesmith (born 1999), American basketball player
- Bette Nesmith Graham (1924–1980), typist, mother of Michael Nesmith, and inventor of liquid paper
- Brian NeSmith, American entrepreneur
- Christian Nesmith (born 1965), musician and son of Michael Nesmith
- James Nesmith (1820–1885), United States Senator from Oregon
- Jason NeSmith, also known as Casper Fandango, member of Casper & the Cookies
- Jason Nesmith (Galaxy Quest), a fictional character in Galaxy Quest film
- Jeff Nesmith, American journalist
- Matthew NeSmith, American professional golfer
- Michael Nesmith (1942–2021), member of the Monkees
- Miles Nesmith (born 2008), American athlete
- Sharon Nesmith (born 1969/70), General in the British Army

== Other uses ==
- Nesmith (singer) (born 1983), Japanese singer and dancer
- Nesmith, South Carolina

== See also ==
- Naismith (disambiguation)
