= William Nicholson (artist, born 1781) =

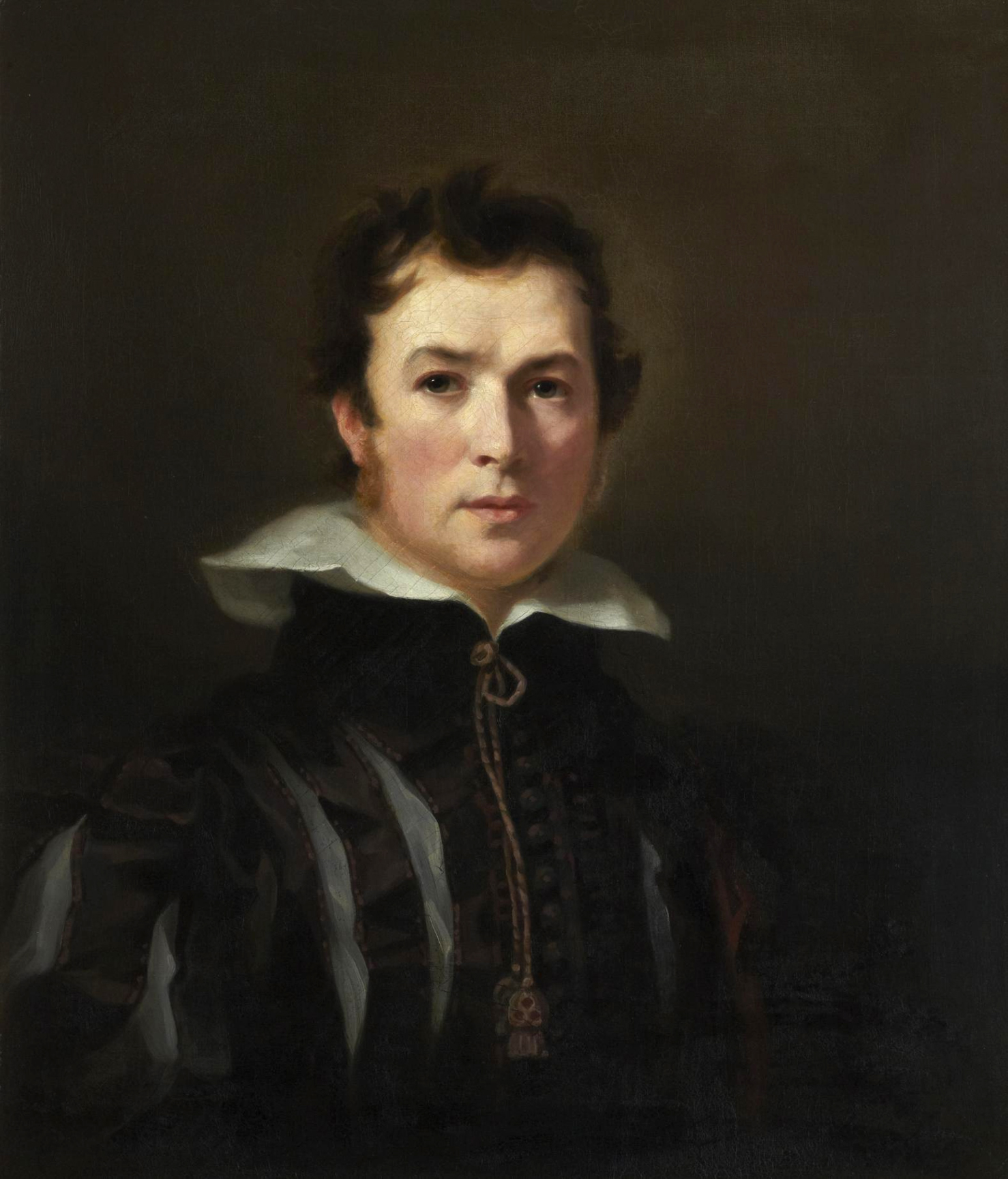
- Self-portrait, circa 1816
- Born: 25 December 1781; Ovingham, Northumberland, England
- Died: 16 August 1844 (aged 62); Edinburgh, Scotland
- Occupations: painter, etcher
- Parents: James Nicholson (father); Elizabeth Orton (mother)

William Nicholson (25 December 1781 – 16 August 1844) was a British painter of portraits and other subjects. He was among the founding members of the Scottish Academy of Painting, Sculpture, and Architecture in 1826, and was its first secretary.

== Life ==
Nicholson was born at Ovingham, in Northumberland, on 25 December 1781, to James Nicholson, a schoolmaster from that village, and his wife Elizabeth, née Orton. He was probably educated at the grammar school in Newcastle-on-Tyne where his father taught. When he left school, he studied painting under the Italian painter Boniface Muss (or Musso) in Newcastle. He received some commissions to paint portrait miniatures, both in Newcastle and in Hull. He also painted larger works, and first exhibited at the Royal Academy in London in 1808.

In 1814 he moved to Edinburgh, where he painted portraits both in oil and in water-colour, but also painted landscapes and animal, architectural and genre subjects. With the architect Thomas Hamilton, Nicholson was among the founding members of the Scottish Academy of Painting, Sculpture, and Architecture in 1826, and from that year until 1830 was its first secretary.

== Work ==
In 1818, Nicholson began publishing his Portraits of Distinguished Living Characters of Scotland, a series of etchings based on his own paintings and those of other artists; it was not completed. He later published some other etchings of his portrait paintings. His subjects included Sir William Allan, James Hogg (the "Ettrick Shepherd"), Lord Jeffrey, Professor John Playfair, Sir Walter Scott, George Thomson, James Watt and John Wilson; there were also etchings of a portrait of Robert Burns by Alexander Nasmyth and of a self-portrait by Sir Henry Raeburn.
