= Charlotte Nasmyth =

Scottish painter

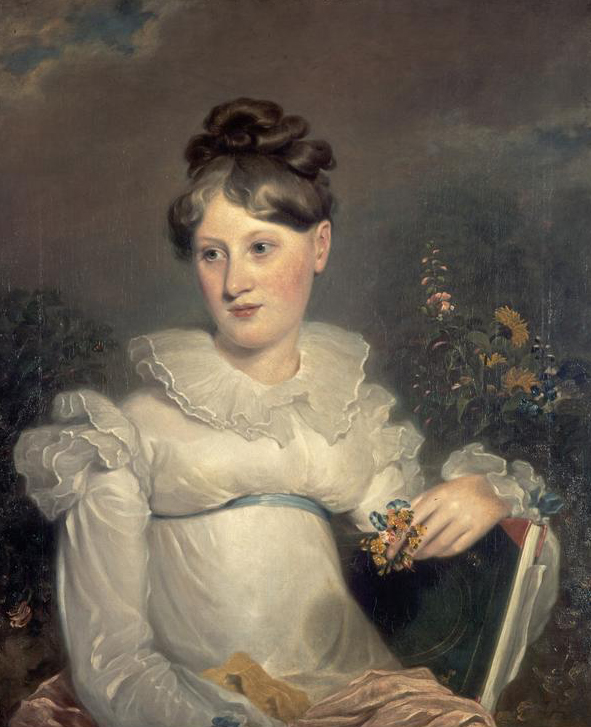
- Charlotte Nasmyth by William Nicholson, 1827
- Born: 17 February 1804; Edinburgh, Scotland
- Died: 26 July 1884 (aged 80); Putney, England
- Known for: Painting

Charlotte Nasmyth (17 February 1804 – 26 July 1884) was a Scottish painter whose works were regarded at the time as "gems", and which are now included in the collections of the Scottish National Gallery and other museums.

== Biography ==
Charlotte was born in St Andrew's parish, Edinburgh, one of eleven children, including six daughters, of Alexander Nasmyth, the "foremost landscape artist of his day".

Charlotte, in common with her siblings Patrick, Jane, Barbara, Margaret, Elizabeth, and Anne, worked as a studio assistant to her father in Edinburgh, and also taught art classes. After the death of their father in 1840, his legacy and an auction of 155 of the family's paintings gave the Nasmyth sisters financial independence, and enabled them move to England. Between 1831 and 1866, Charlotte exhibited her romantic landscapes and other works at the Royal Scottish Academy, the Royal Society of British Artists, the Royal Academy, and other institutions. She painted mainly in oils, and sometimes in watercolours, and also produced some etchings. Her subjects include landscapes of north Wales and various regions of England, as well as Scotland, indicating that she travelled widely throughout Britain. She was the most prolific artist of the six sisters. Modern writers have described her as "the most flamboyant and wildest", working "with a greater freedom and panache than her sisters". Contemporary reviewers described Charlotte's paintings as "little gems", "delicious small-room pictures ... meant to .. form the individual treasure of some limited sphere of its own." Gnarled tree trunks with broken branches were a favourite subject of Charlotte's, and a reviewer in 1866 wrote of one of her landscapes, "This is the finest bit of tree painting in the exhibition; vigorous, crisp, and beautiful in colour."

Charlotte died in Putney, Surrey, in 1884.

A portrait of Charlotte by William Nicholson is in the collection of the National Galleries Scotland, and another by Andrew Geddes is in the British Museum.

== Works ==
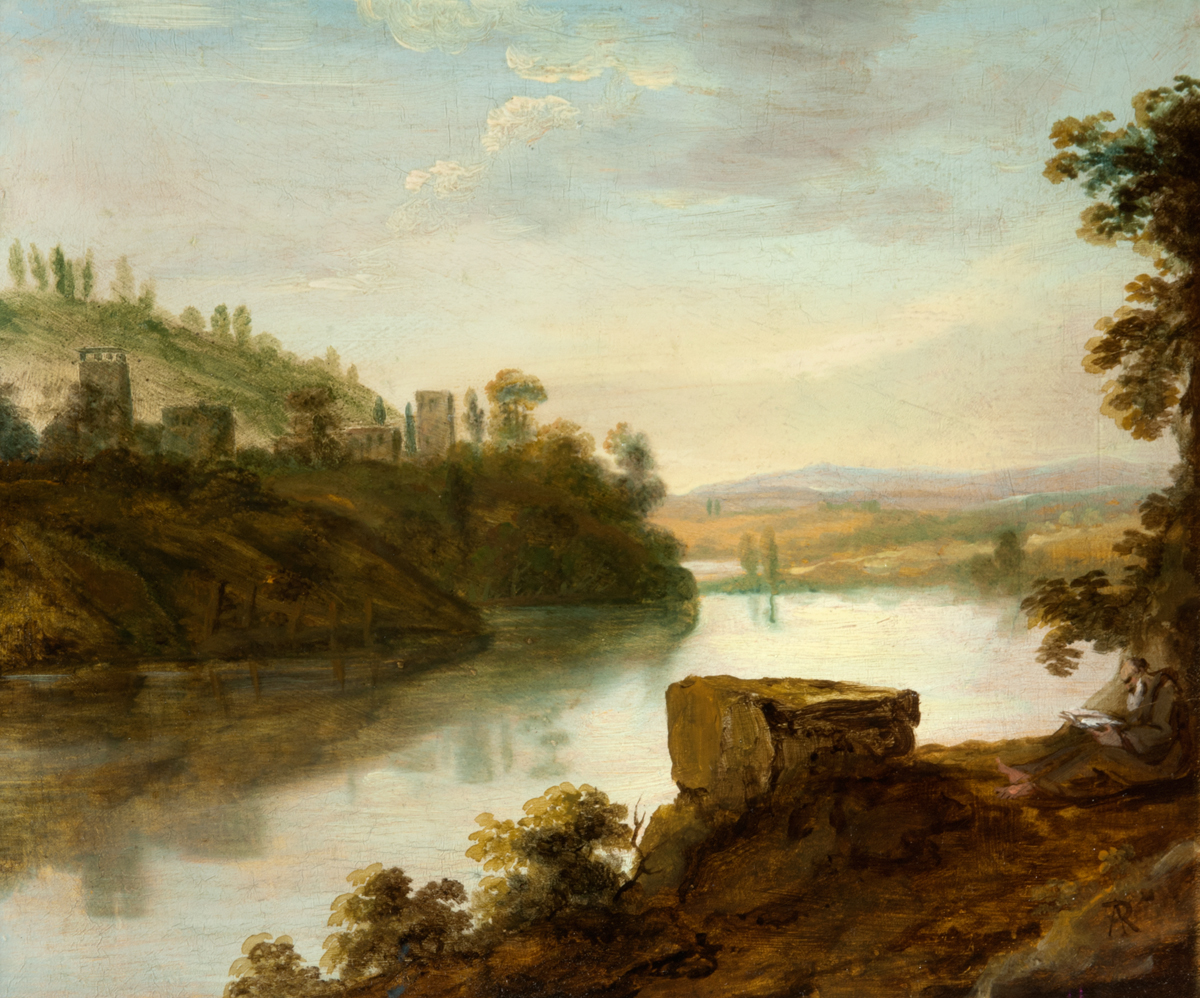
Pastoral Landscape

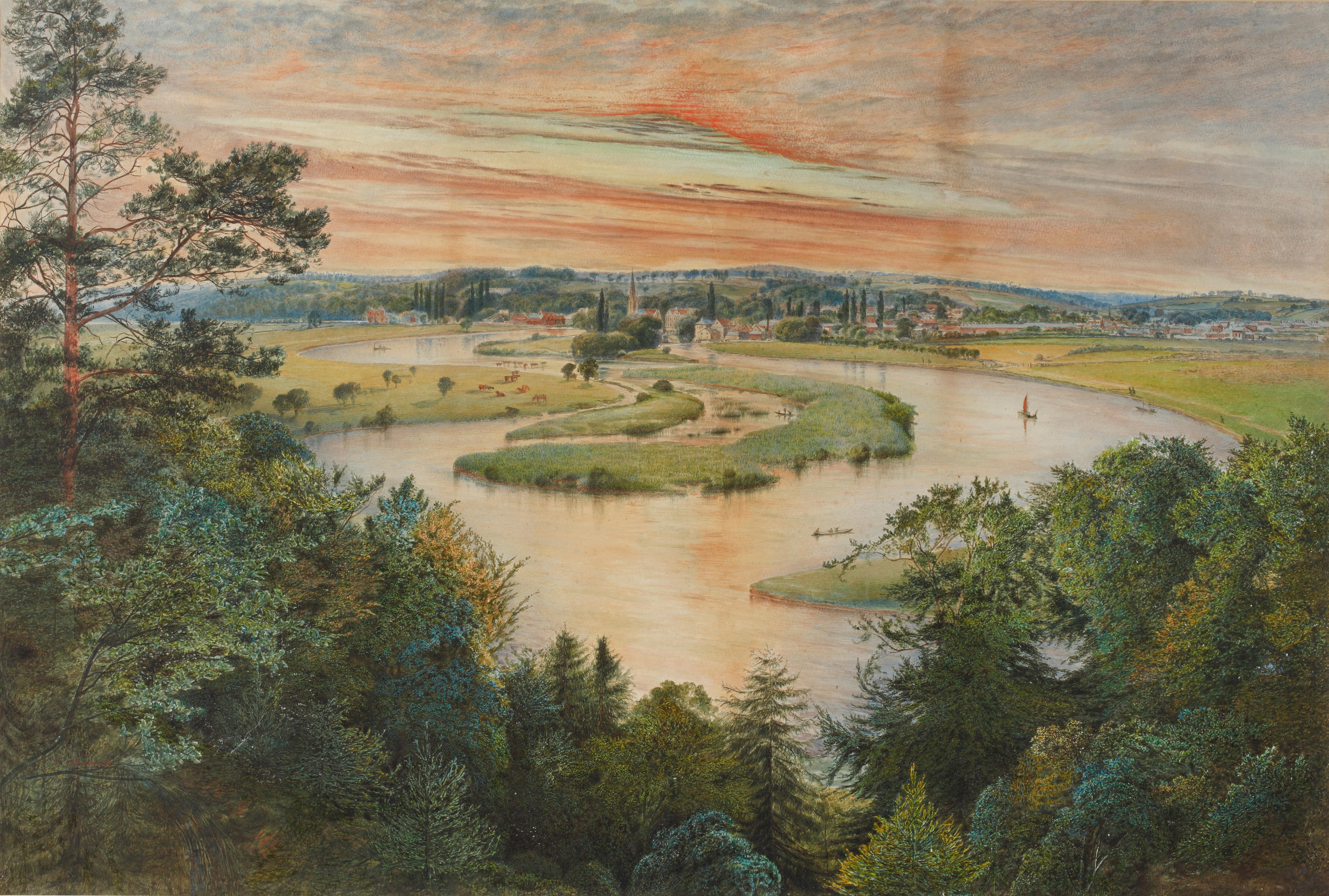
Marlow lock from Cookham Dean

Works by Charlotte are held by the Scottish National Gallery, the British Museum, the University of Dundee Fine Art Collections, Alloa Tower (the National Trust for Scotland), and Hill Top and the Beatrix Potter Gallery (the National Trust).

=== Selected works ===
- Highland Pass
- Hampstead Heath
- Musselburgh
- The Bay of Naples
- Pastoral Landscape
- Kincardine Castle, Perthshire
- View of Alloa and Stirling Castle from Clackmann Hill
- The Entrance to Loch Katrine
- At Barnes, near Putney
- Penshurst Park, Kent
- Near Penryn, North Wales
- A Wooded Landscape with Travellers on a Path
- View in Essex
- Derwent Water
- Strathearn, Perthshire
- Burnham Beeches
- Mill at Barton, Lancashire
- Cottage in Epping Forest
- Distant View of London from Norwood
- Cottage of North Hope, North Wales
- Marlow lock from Cookham Dean
- Rome.
