= Barbara Nasmyth =

Scottish painter and educator

Barbara Nasmyth (15 April 1790 – 11 February 1870) was a Scottish oil and watercolour painter and educator.

== Early life ==
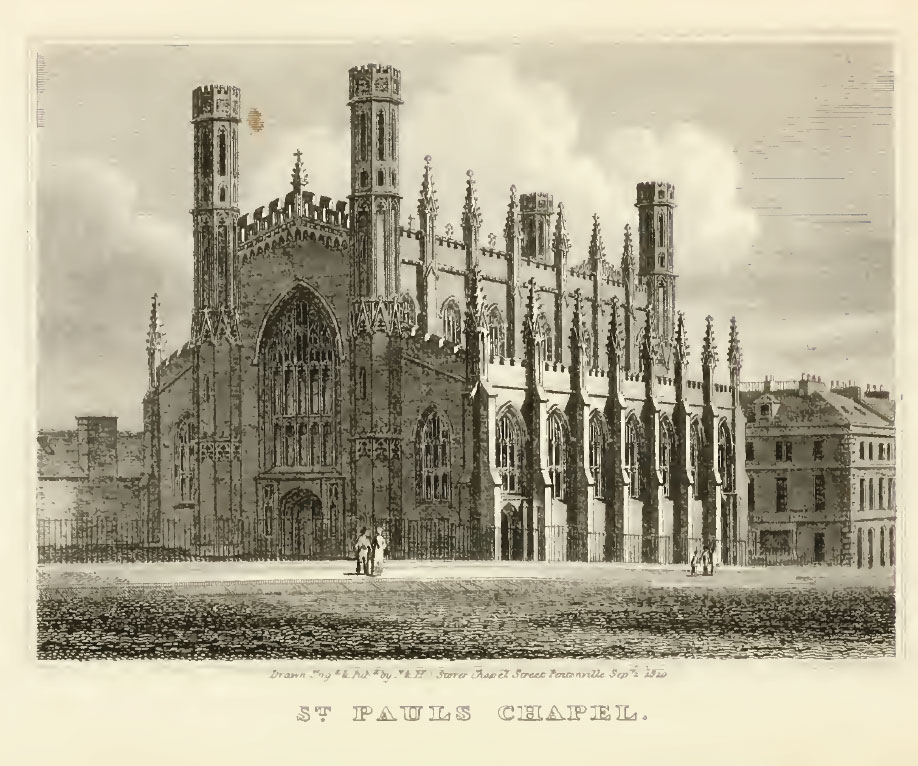
York Place, Edinburgh 1820

Barbara Nasmyth was the daughter of the artist Alexander Nasmyth. Her sisters Jane, Margaret, Elizabeth, Anne and Charlotte were all also artists. Her eldest brother Patrick Nasmyth was a fellow landscapist, and her brother James Nasmyth, was the inventor of the steam hammer.

After the death of her father in 1840, Nasmyth moved to Patricroft, near Manchester, closer to her brother James. Ten years later, in 1850, she moved to London.

== Works ==
Nasmyth was particularly known for her proficient handling of woodland scenery utilising oil and watercolour. Her works often depicted scenes of the Lake District; or Edinburgh and its surrounding area. Her style was similar to that of her father who she studied with at their home, and at his art school, in York Place, Edinburgh.

She exhibited with:

- the Royal Scottish Academy from 1830 to 1860
- the Royal Hibernian Academy in 1843
- the Royal Society of British Artists from 1854 to 1866
- the Royal Glasgow Institute of the Fine Arts from 1862 to 1866

Following her father's death in 1840, she is said to have worked "with success and much respect" in London.

== Teaching ==
Barbara Nasmyth taught at York Place School.
