= Charles Richardson (lexicographer) =

English teacher and lexicographer

Charles Richardson (1775–1865) was an English teacher, lexicographer and linguist.

== Life ==
He was born at Tulse Hill in July 1775 and started a legal career, but left it early for scholarly and literary pursuits. He kept a school on Clapham Common, and among his pupils there were Charles James Mathews, who assisted Richardson as a copyist, John Mitchell Kemble, and John Maddison Morton, the dramatist.

Richardson gave up his school after 1827, and then lived at Lower Tulse Hill, Norwood. Before 1859 he moved to 23 Torrington Square in London. In 1853 a pension of £75 a year was granted to him from the civil list. He died at Feltham on Friday, 6 Oct. 1865, and was buried in his mother's grave at Clapham. A bust of John Horne Tooke at University College, London, by Francis Leggatt Chantrey, was bequeathed by him.

== Works ==
Richardson was a philologist of the school of John Horne Tooke. In 1815 he published Illustrations to English Philology, consisting of a critical examination of Samuel Johnson's A Dictionary of the English Language and a reply to Dugald Stewart's criticism of Horne Tooke's Diversions of Purley. The book was reissued in 1826.

In 1818 the opening portions of an English lexicon, by Richardson, appeared in the Encyclopædia Metropolitana. In 1834 he issued the prospectus of a New English Dictionary, and the work itself was published by William Pickering in parts between January 1835 and the spring of 1837. It was published in volumes, with additional front matter and some omitted words including "retrospect" appended, in April 1837. The dictionary is a republication of the lexicon, with improvements and additions. Richardson's principle was to rely on etymology. He was severely criticised by Noah Webster in his Mistakes and Corrections (1837), especially for his ignorance of oriental languages. "Tooke's principle", wrote Webster, "that a word has one meaning, and one only, and that from this all usages must spring, is substantially correct; but he has, in most cases, failed to find that meaning, and you [Richardson] have rarely or never advanced a step beyond him". In quotations from authors the dictionary was far more copious than any previous work of its class in English. Despite many technical failings the work was commended by the Quarterly Magazine and the Gentleman's Magazine. An abridged single volume edition, without the quotations, appeared in 1839, with a new preface, but uncorrected.

He also published a book on the study of language, an explanation of Tooke's Diversions of Purley (1854). He contributed papers to the Gentleman's Magazine, and wrote essays on 'English Grammar and English Grammarians,' and on 'Fancy and Imagination.'

== Family ==
He married the artist Elizabeth Nasmyth, widow of Daniel Terry the actor, whose son was at his school. Elizabeth ran an artist's school at her house assisted by Anne Nasmyth. The six Nasmyth sisters were all artists and at one time they all moved to live close to each other in Putney. Elizabeth died in 1863, and to her daughter Jane he bequeathed his house at Tulse Hill.
