= Jane Nasmyth =

Scottish painter (1788–1867)

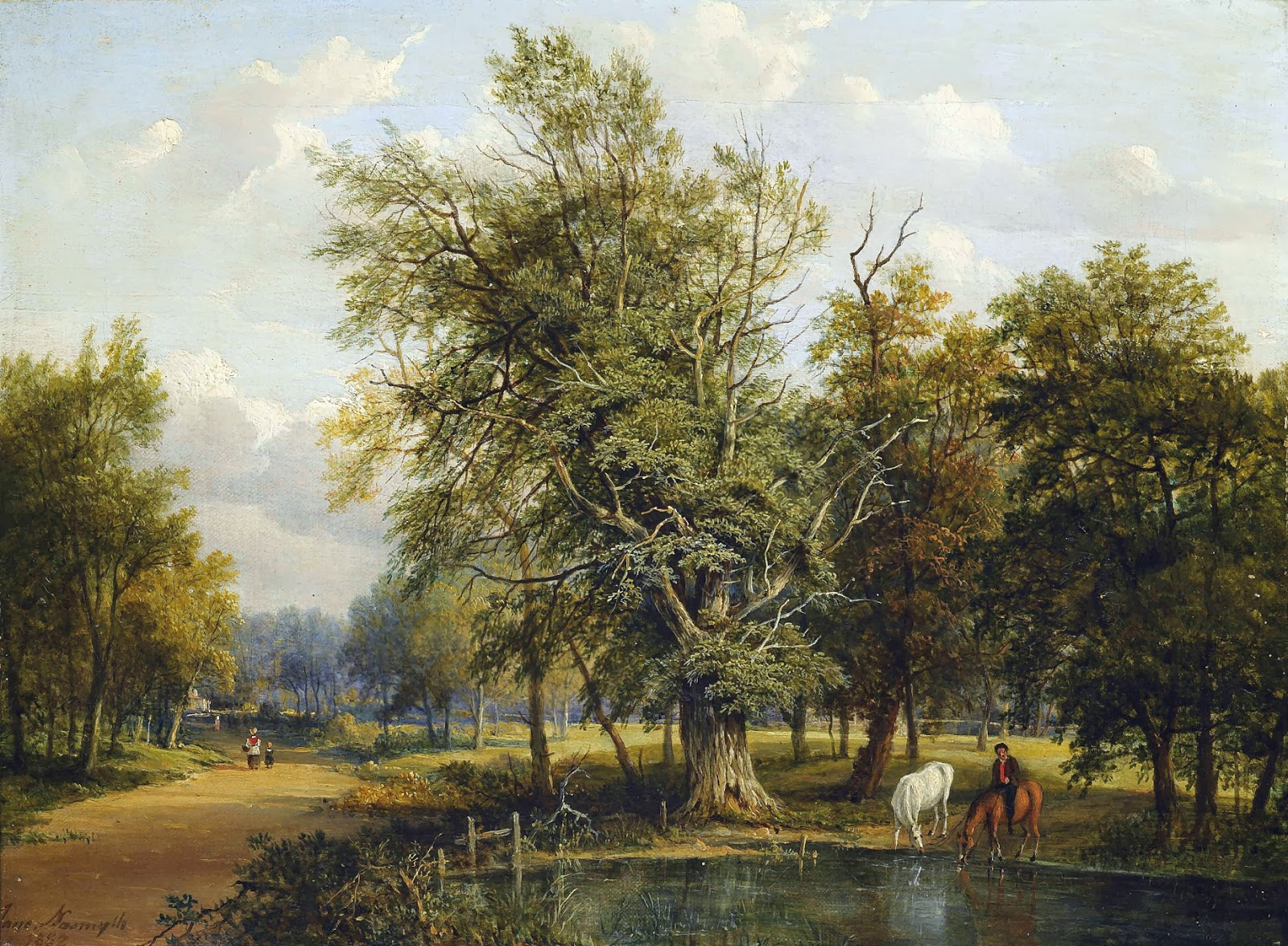
Jane Nasmyth - On Putney Heath (1852)

Jane Nasmyth (29 March 1788 – 11 May 1867) was a Scottish landscape painter of the Nasmyth School in Edinburgh. She was the daughter and student of the portrait and landscape painter Alexander Nasmyth.

== Early life ==
Jane Nasmyth was born in Edinburgh on 29 March 1788 to Barbara Foulis and Alexander Nasmyth. Alexander Nasmyth and Barbara Foulis (the sister of Sir James Foulis, 7th Baronet of Woodhall) had married on 3 January 1786, and were living in Edinburgh where Alexander worked as a painter. Jane was the second eldest of eleven children: Patrick, Jane, Barbara, Margaret, Elizabeth, Anne, Charlotte, Alexander, George, James and Mary. Alexander Nasmyth worked as a portrait artist and painter of outdoor conversation pieces in the late 1780s, painting and befriending the poet Robert Burns and establishing the Nasmyth school of landscape painting in his home at 47 York Place, Edinburgh. Jane Nasmyth grew up in a home that served as an artistic and cultural centre of Edinburgh. She helped raise her siblings, advise her parents in domestic and financial matters, and train artists at the Nasmyth school; for her sound judgment, she was nicknamed “Old Solid”.

== Career ==
Jane Nasmyth and her siblings were trained as artists by their father, who employed innovative teaching techniques by encouraging sketching landscapes outdoors. She worked closely with Alexander, who encouraged his daughters to become professional artists. All the Nasmyth sisters as well as Patrick Nasmyth exhibited their work and painted professionally in London, Manchester and Edinburgh. In the early years of her artistic practice, Jane Nasmyth collaborated with her father and worked under his close supervision, producing landscapes which were considered indistinguishable from his and which were sold as pictures “by Miss Jane, with some of [Alexander Nasmyth’s] painting on it,” possibly to increase profit.

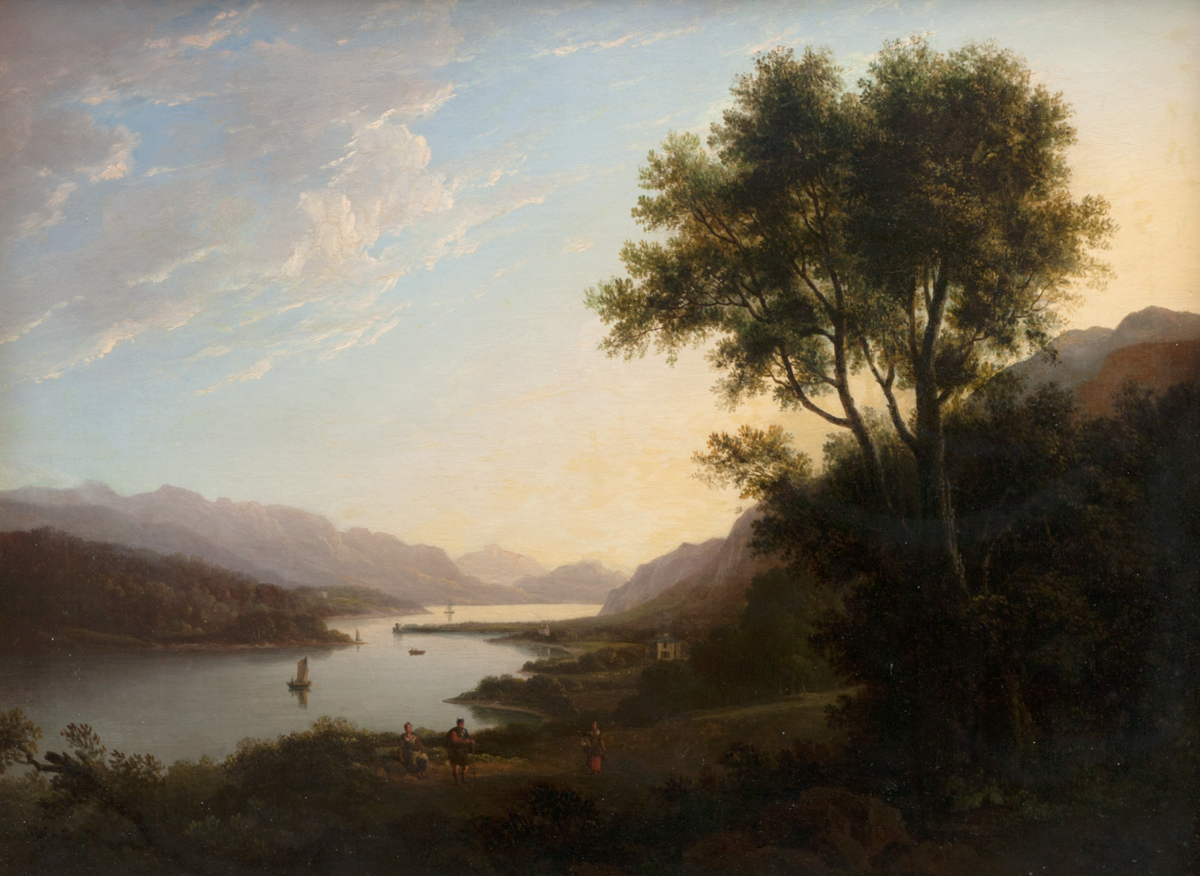
Loch Ness by Nasmyth now in Inverness Art Gallery

Nasmyth went on to be recognized as a prominent landscape painter and to participate in numerous exhibitions. From 1826 to 1829, she exhibited at the British Institution. She exhibited the painting Loch Katrine—from the Point of west Drumberg in the 1837 Exhibition of the Liverpool Academy, in which Anne, Charlotte, and Alexander Nasmyth were also featured. She took part in the Royal Hibernian Academy in 1843. In the 1840s, she exhibited “a finely-painted bit of Highland scenery” in the Exhibition of the Works of Modern Artists in Manchester; On the Derwent, Borodale, Cumberland and Distant View of Stirling from Alloa at the Birmingham Society of Artists; and View of Perth; Comrie, Perthshire; and Windsor Forest at the Devon and Exeter Society for the Encouragement of Art. She again exhibited at the Birmingham Society of Artists in 1846, with the paintings Lake of Windermere and On the Tweed, near Drygrange, Roxburghshire. From 1839 to 1866, Nasmyth exhibited at the Royal Society of British Artists; from 1830 to 1862, at the Royal Scottish Academy; from 1862 to 1865, at the Royal Glasgow Institute.

== Works ==
- Watermill (1820) — Hunterian Art Gallery, University of Glasgow
- Loch Ness — Inverness Museum and Art Gallery (High Life Highland)
- On Putney Heath
- Loch Katrine—from the Point of West Drumberg
- Lake of Windermere
- On the Derwent, Borodale, Cumberland
- Distant View of Stirling from Alloa
- Furness abbey with a Distant View of Morecombe Bay
- Extensive View of Edinburgh from Inverleith — National Galleries of Scotland
- A Highland Loch at Sunset
- A Lakeland View
- A View of Cambuskenneth Tower
- Figures in a Highland Landscape
- An Extensive View of loch Lomond, near Dumbarton, with Travellers on a Path, Mountains Beyond
- View of Perth
- Comrie, Perthshire
- Windsor Forest
