= Alexander Nasmyth =

Scottish painter (1758–1840)

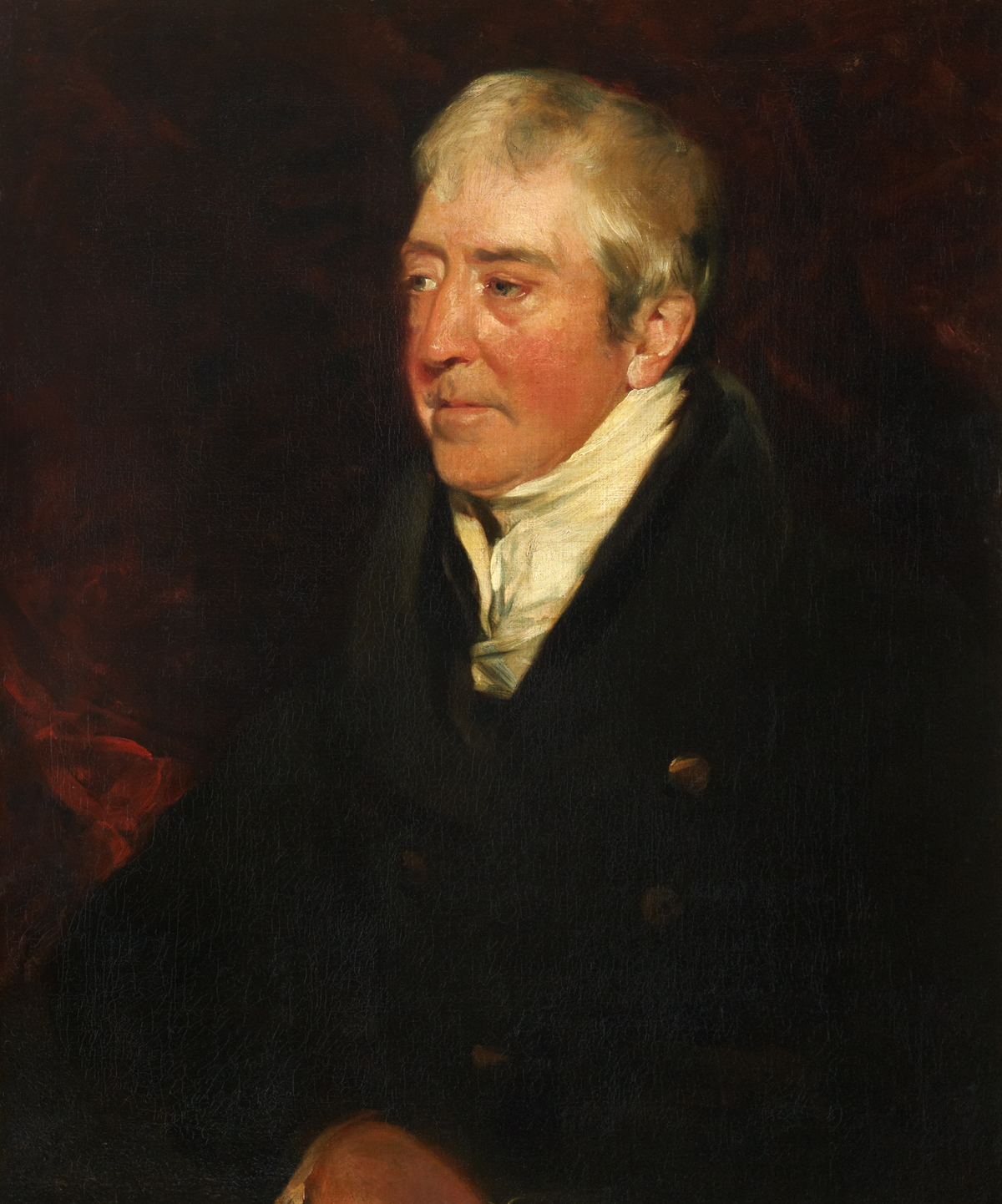
- Portrait by Andrew Geddes, 1810
- Born: 9 September 1758; Edinburgh, Scotland
- Died: April 10, 1840 (aged 81); Edinburgh, Scotland
- Known for: Painting

Alexander Nasmyth (9 September 1758 – 10 April 1840) was a Scottish portrait and landscape painter, a pupil of Allan Ramsay. He also undertook several architectural commissions.

== Biography ==
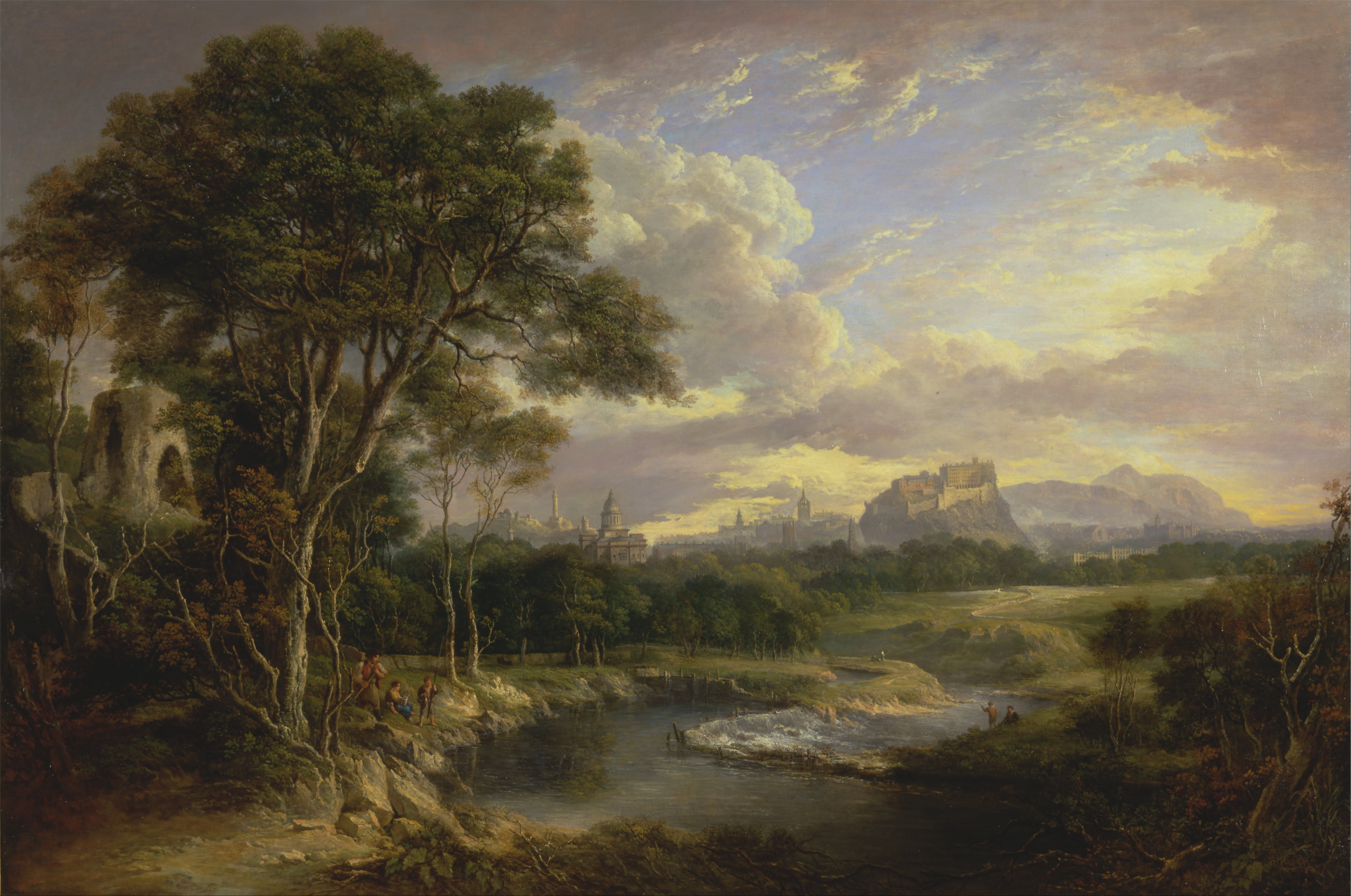
View of the City of Edinburgh, Yale Center for British Art

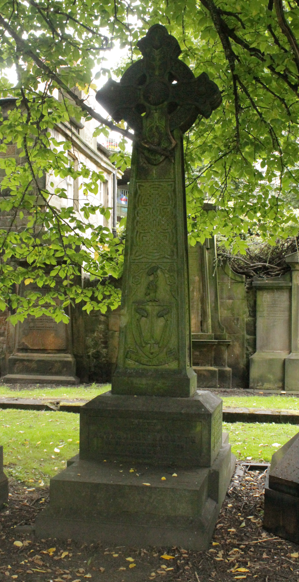
The grave of Alexander Nasmyth, St Cuthbert's Churchyard

Nasmyth was born in Edinburgh on 9 September 1758. He studied at the Royal High School and the Trustees' Academy and was apprenticed to a coachbuilder. Aged sixteen, he was taken to London by portrait painter Allan Ramsay where he worked on subordinate parts of Ramsay's works. Nasmyth returned to Edinburgh in 1778, where he worked as a portrait painter. Offered a loan by Patrick Miller of Dalswinton, Nasmyth left in 1782 for Italy, where he remained two years furthering his studies. In Italy he devoted most of his attention to landscape painting, and is recorded as having copied a work by Claude Lorrain.

Nasmyth returned to Scotland where for the next few years he continued his career as a portraitist. He painted some works in the style of Ramsay, but most were conversation pieces with outdoor settings. His portrait of Robert Burns, who became a close friend, is now in the Scottish National Gallery. Eventually, Nasmyth's strong Liberal opinions offended many of his aristocratic patrons in a politically charged Edinburgh, leading to a falling off in commissions for portraits, and in 1792 he completely abandoned the genre, turning instead to landscape painting. He also began painting scenery for theatres, an activity he continued for the next thirty years, and in 1796 painted a panorama. He painted most of the canvases for the 1820 production of The Heart of Mid-Lothian; or, The Lily of St. Leonards at the Theatre Royal, Edinburgh. A scene sketch for the theatre's 1822 production of The Bride of Lammermoor is held by the National Galleries of Scotland.

His landscapes are all of actual places, and architecture is usually an important element. Some works were painted to illustrate the effects that new buildings would have on an area, such as Inverary from the Sea, painted for the Duke of Argyll to show the setting a proposed lighthouse.

Nasmyth had a great interest in engineering, and proposed several ideas that were later widely used, although he never patented any of them. In October 1788, when Patrick Miller sailed the world's first successful steamship, designed by William Symington, on Dalswinton Loch, Nasmyth was one of the crew.

He was employed by members of the Scottish nobility in the improvement and beautification of their estates. He designed the circular temple covering St Bernard's Well by the Water of Leith (1789), and bridges at Almondell, West Lothian, and Tongland, Kirkcudbrightshire. In 1815 he was one of those invited to submit proposals for the expansion of Edinburgh New Town.

Nasmyth set up a drawing school and "instilled a whole generation with the importance of drawing as a tool of empirical investigation"; his pupils included David Wilkie, David Roberts, Clarkson Stanfield and John Thomson of Duddingston; and it was probably from him that John James Ruskin (father of John Ruskin) learned to paint as a schoolboy in Edinburgh in the later 1790s. Another successful pupil was the painter, teacher, art dealer and connoisseur Andrew Wilson, who had his first art training under Nasmyth. Nasmyth was not only the tutor to the polymath Mary Somerville but he also introduced her to the leading intellectuals in Edinburgh.

Nasmyth died at home, 47 York Place (roughly opposite the house of Sir Henry Raeburn), in Edinburgh. He was buried in St Cuthbert's Churchyard at the west end of Princes Street. The grave lies in the southern section towards the south-west.

== Family ==
He married Barbara Foulis, the daughter of Sir James Foulis, 5th Baronet of Colinton, on 3 January 1786.

Nasmyth's eldest six daughters all became notable artists. His daughters were Jane, Barbara, Margaret, Elizabeth, Anne and Charlotte. His eldest son, Patrick Nasmyth, studied under his father, then went to London and attracted attention as a landscapist. Another son, James Nasmyth, invented the steam hammer. He had three other children, Alexander, George and Mary.

== Architectural commissions ==
Nasmyth obtained several commissions as architect (in terms of a masterplan and artistic concept): notably Rosneath House and Dunglass Castle. In 1810, he designed the Nasmyth Bridge as part of the Almondell Estate, now in the Almondell and Calderwood Country Park.

== Gallery ==
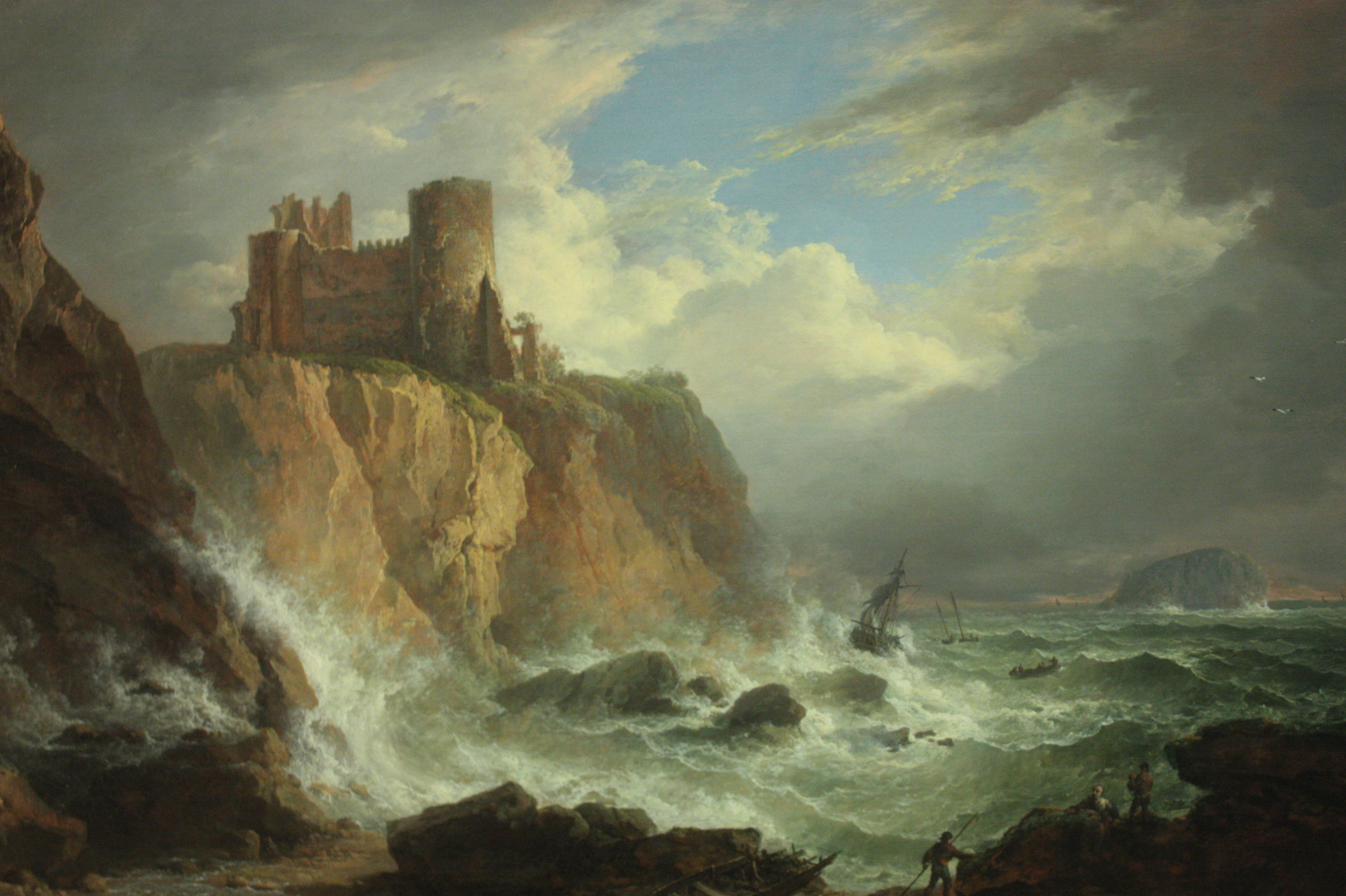
View of Tantallon Castle and the Bass Rock

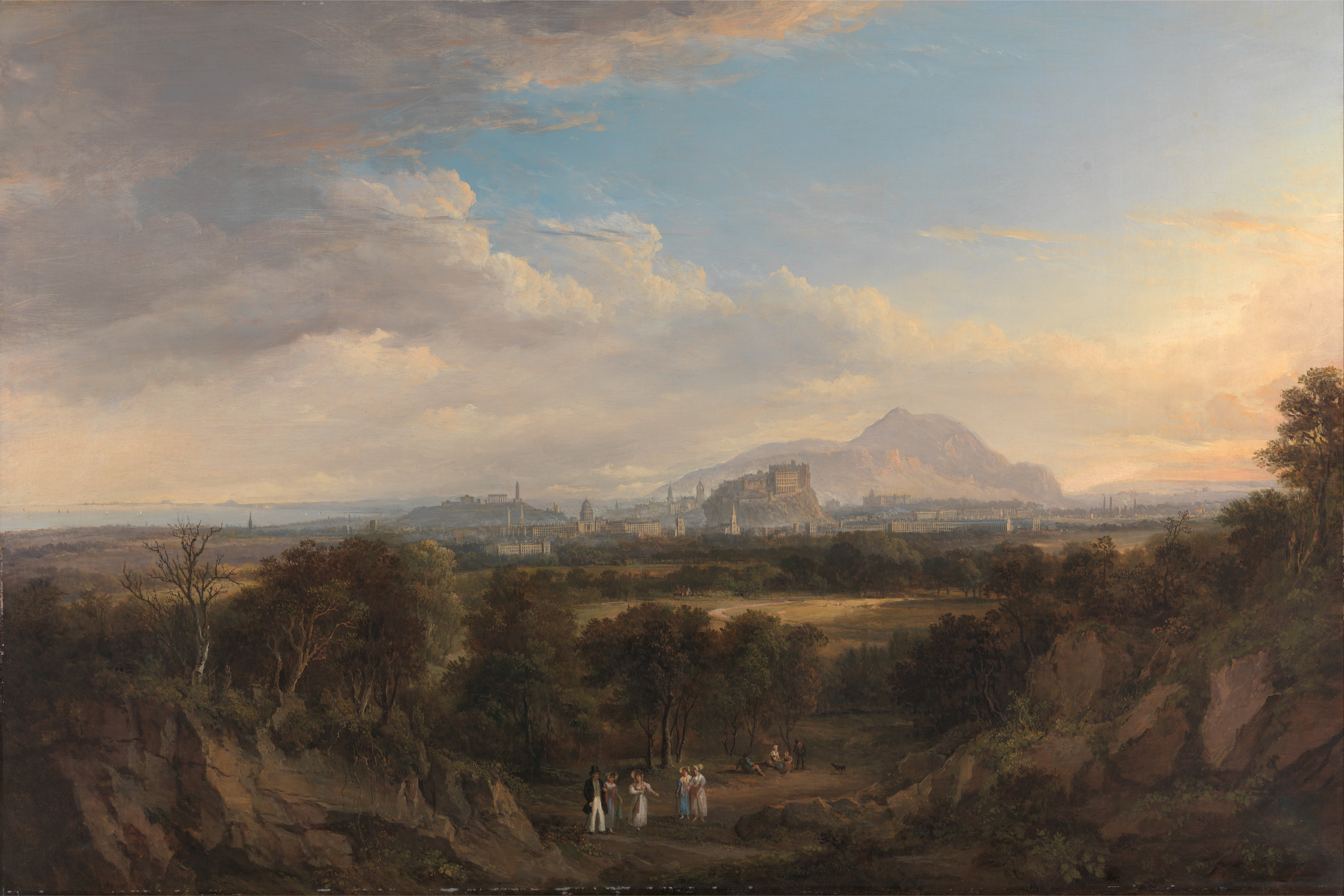
A View of Edinburgh from the West (1822–6)

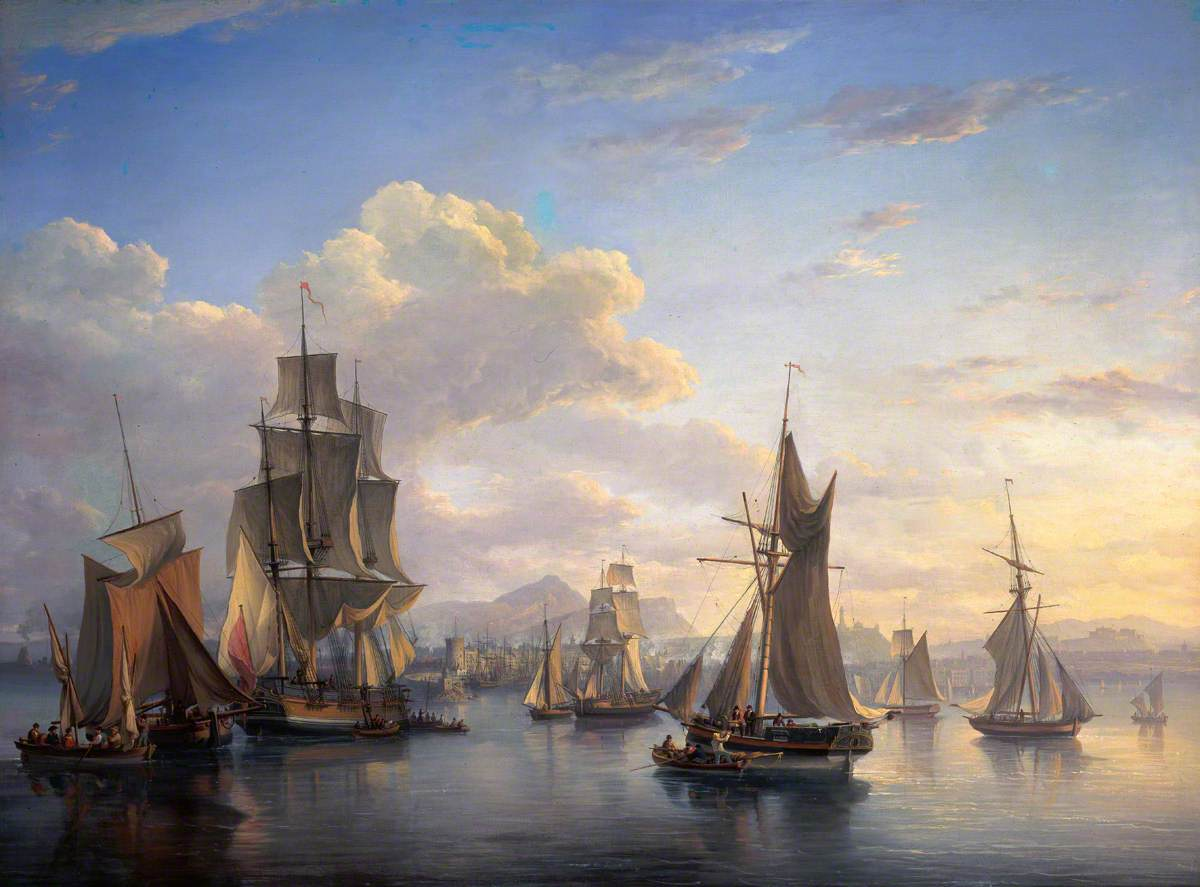
The Port of Leith, 1824

High Street and the Lawn Market, Edinburgh, 1824

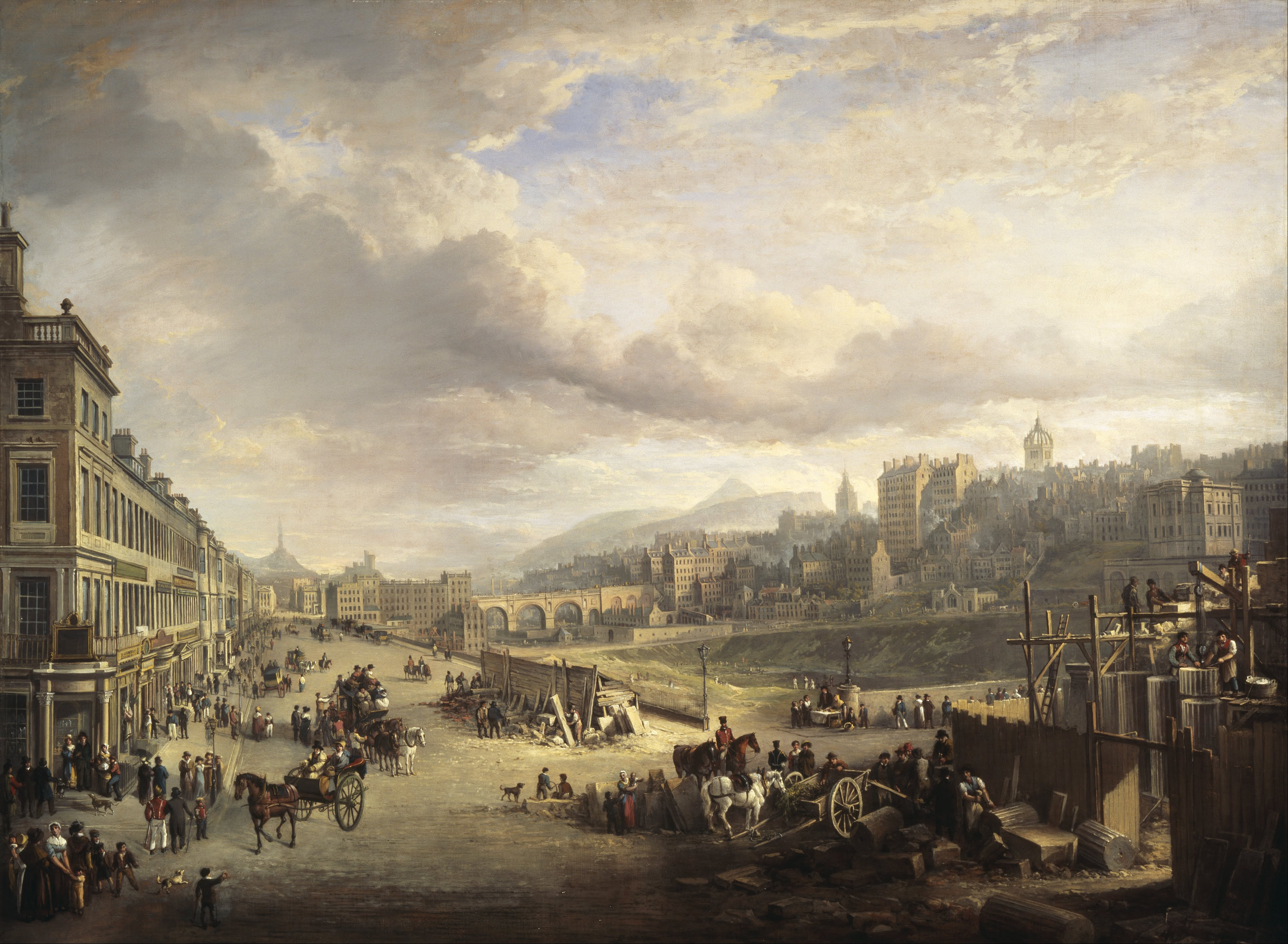
Princes Street, 1825

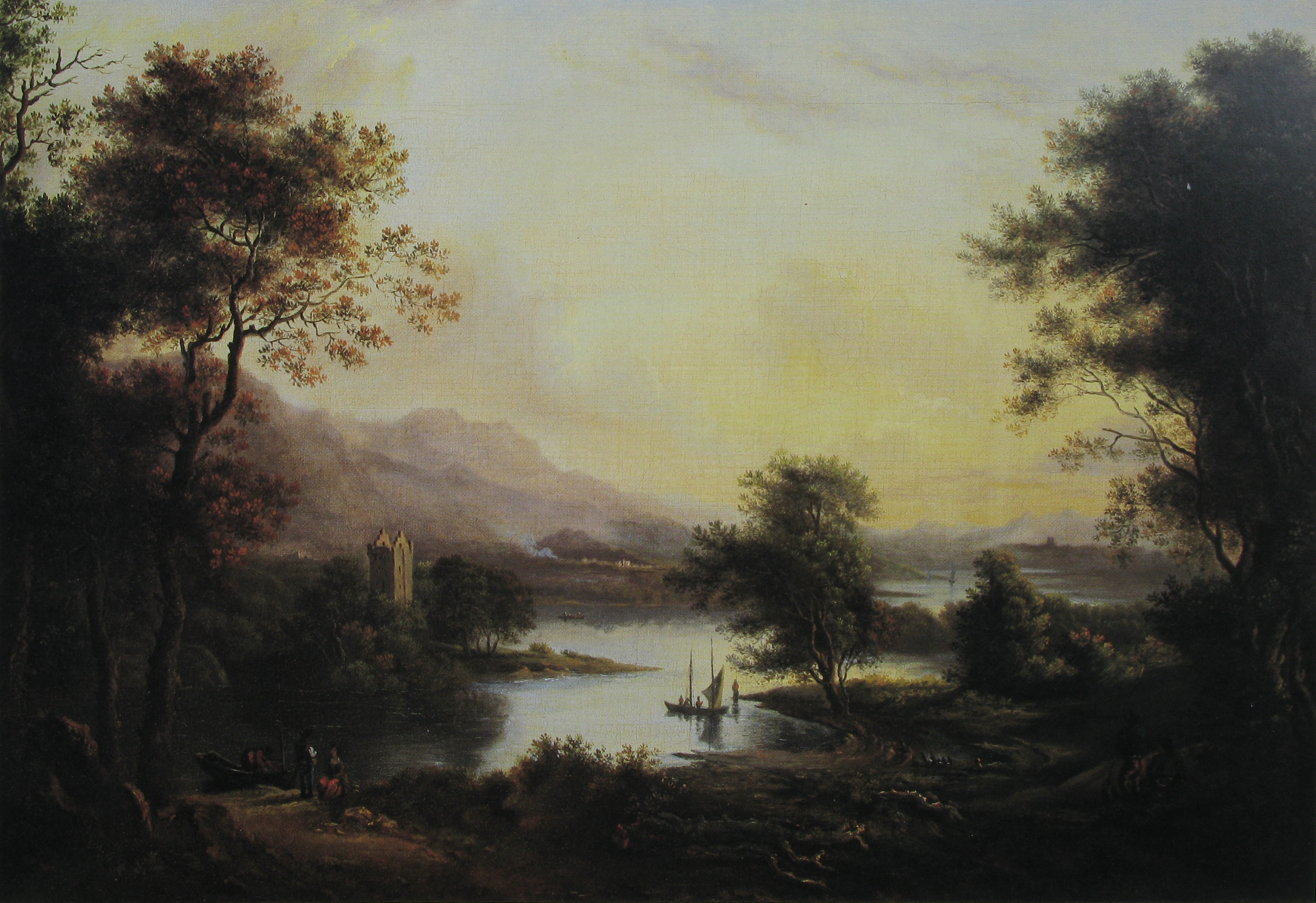
A Highland Loch landscape

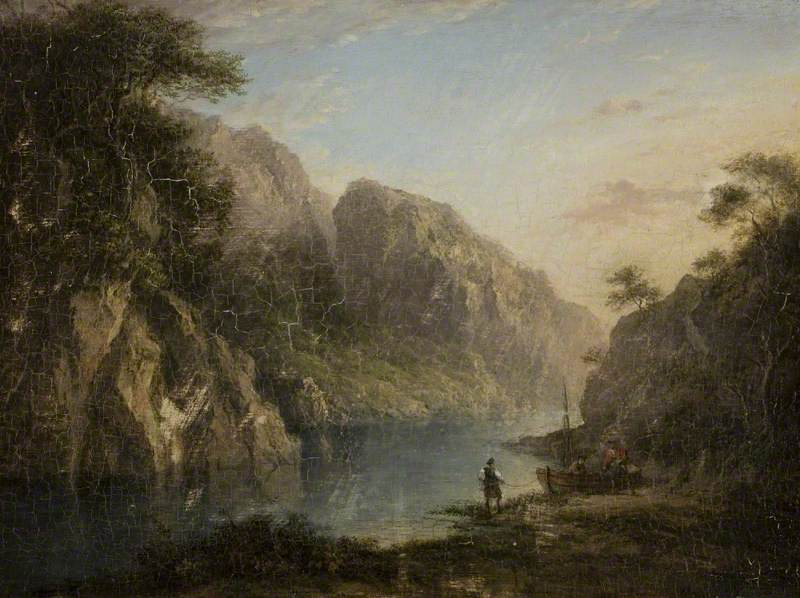
Pass of the Cows, Highlands

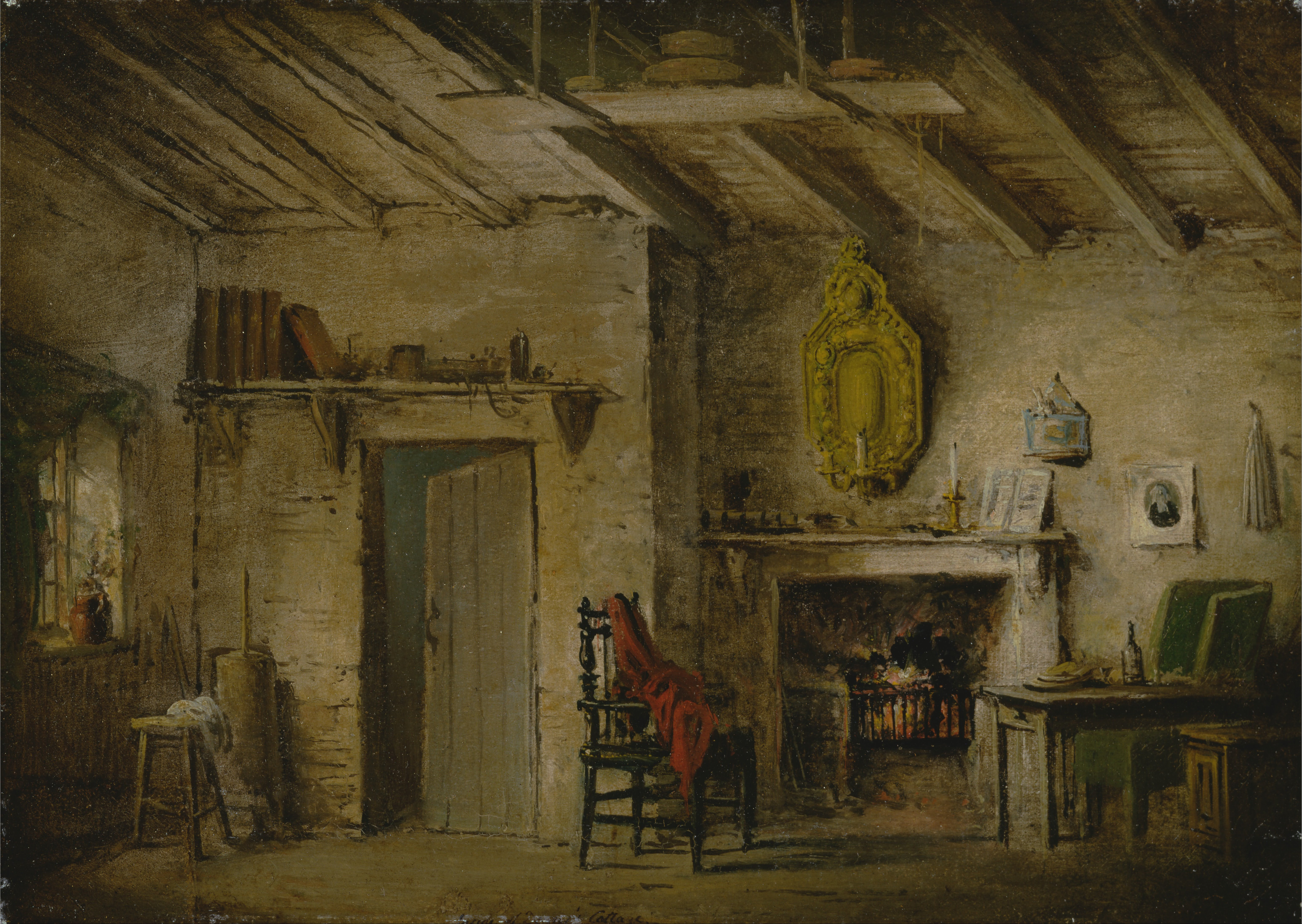
Stage design for Heart of Midlothian; Deans' Cottage

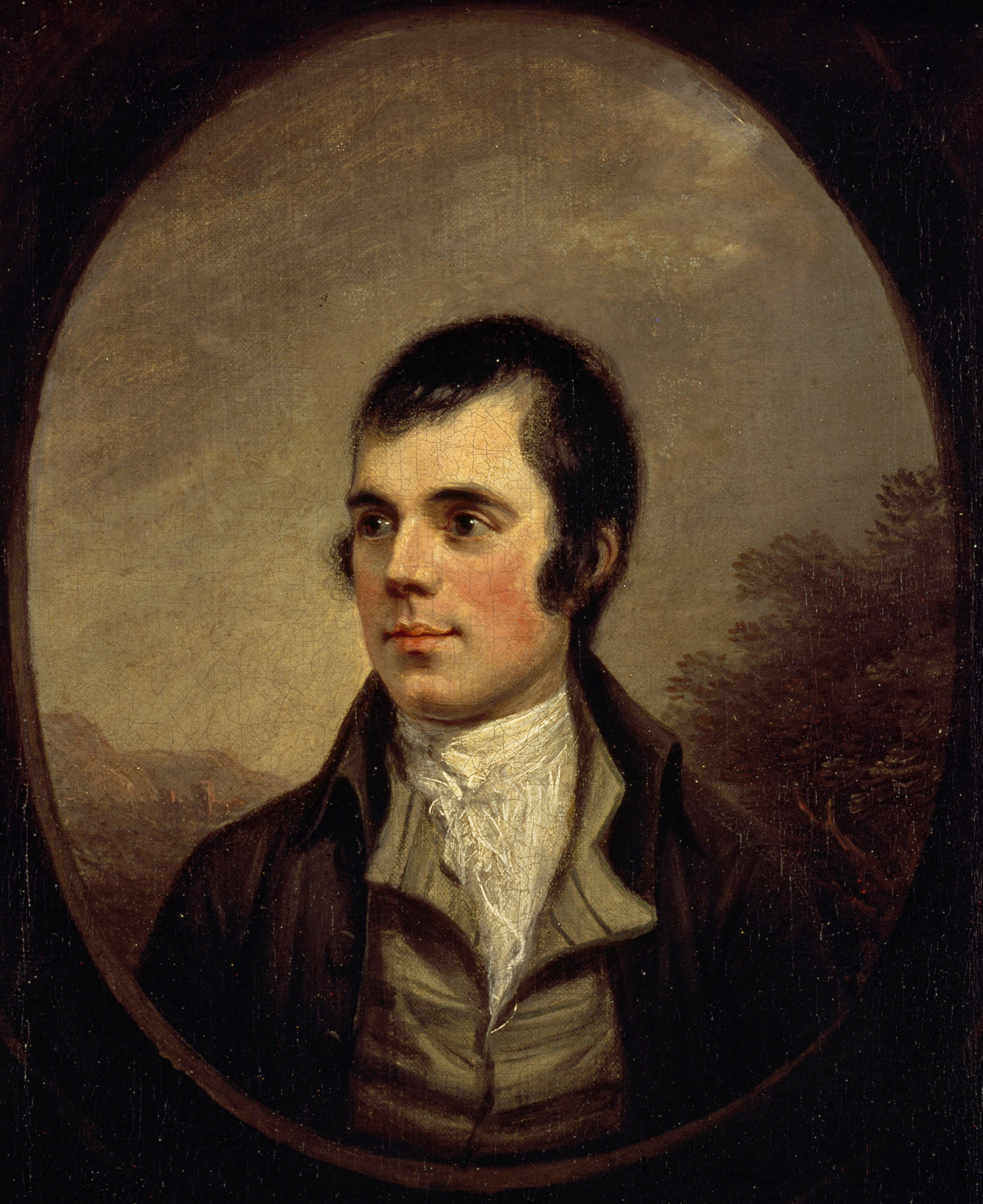
Robert Burns (1787)

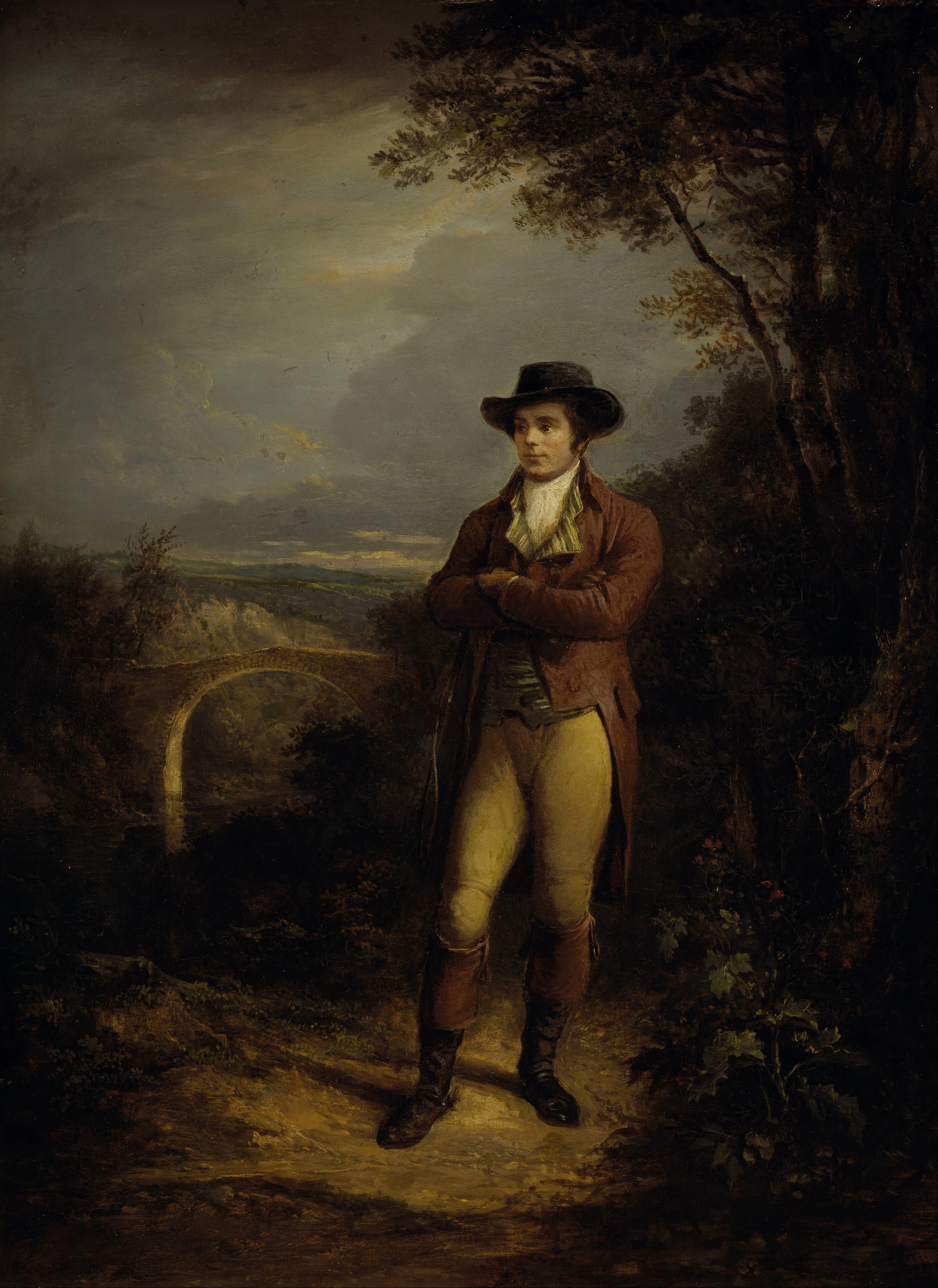
Robert Burns, 1759 – 1796. Poet

== Notes ==
=== Sources ===
- Macmillan, Duncan (1986). Painting in Scotland: The Golden Age: [Talbot Rice Art Centre, University of Edinburgh, 8-31 August 1986: Tate Gallery, London, 15 October 1986-4 January 1987]. Phaidon Press. ISBN 9780714824550.
- Nasmyth, James (1885). Samuel Smiles (ed.). James Nasmyth, Engineer: An Autobiography. John Murray.
- For an account of Andrew Wilson see "The Scottish Claude" by John Ramm, Antique Dealer & Collectors Guide, July 1997, Vol 50, No. 12
