= Patrick Nasmyth =

Scottish painter (1787–1831)

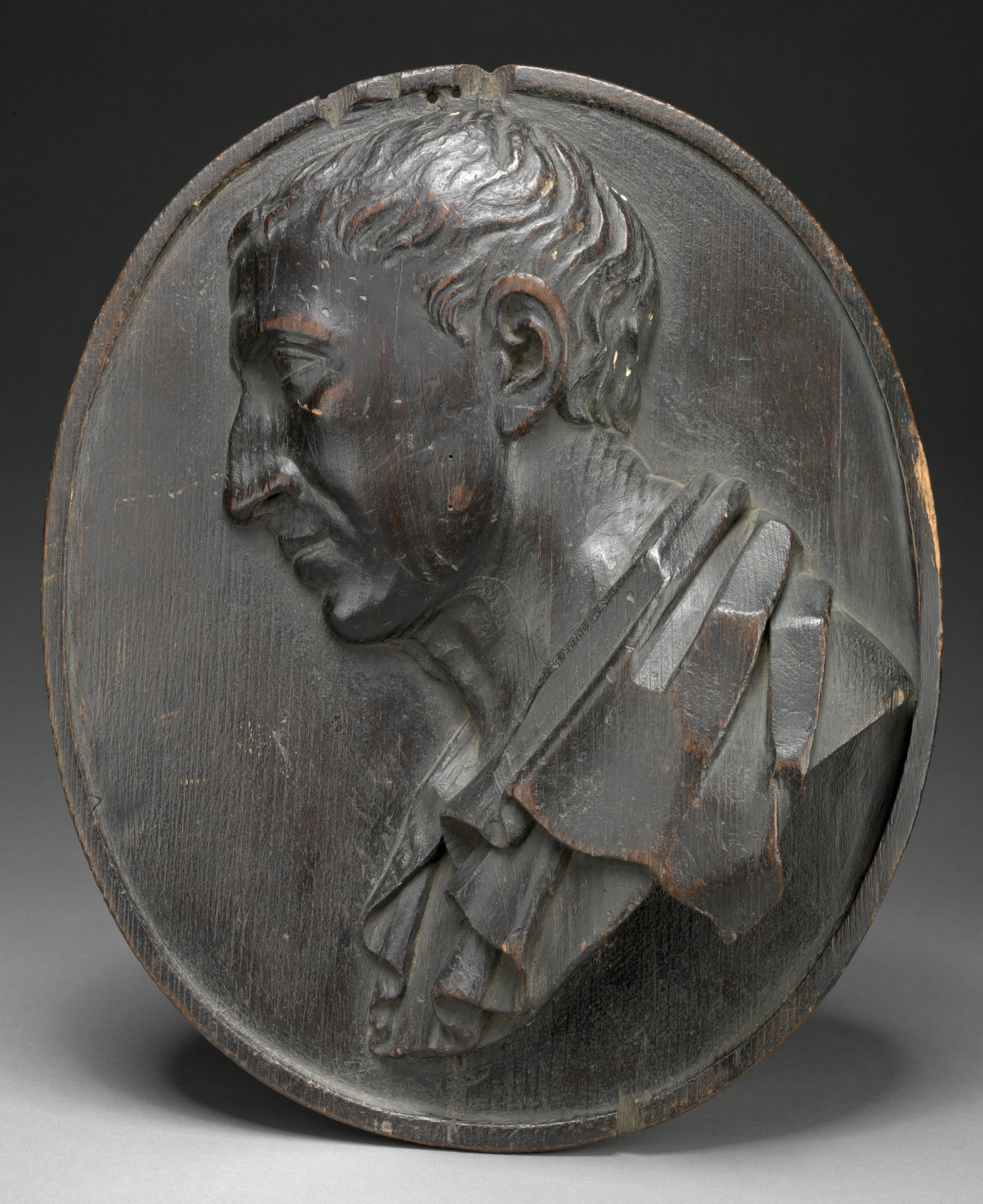
Self portrait

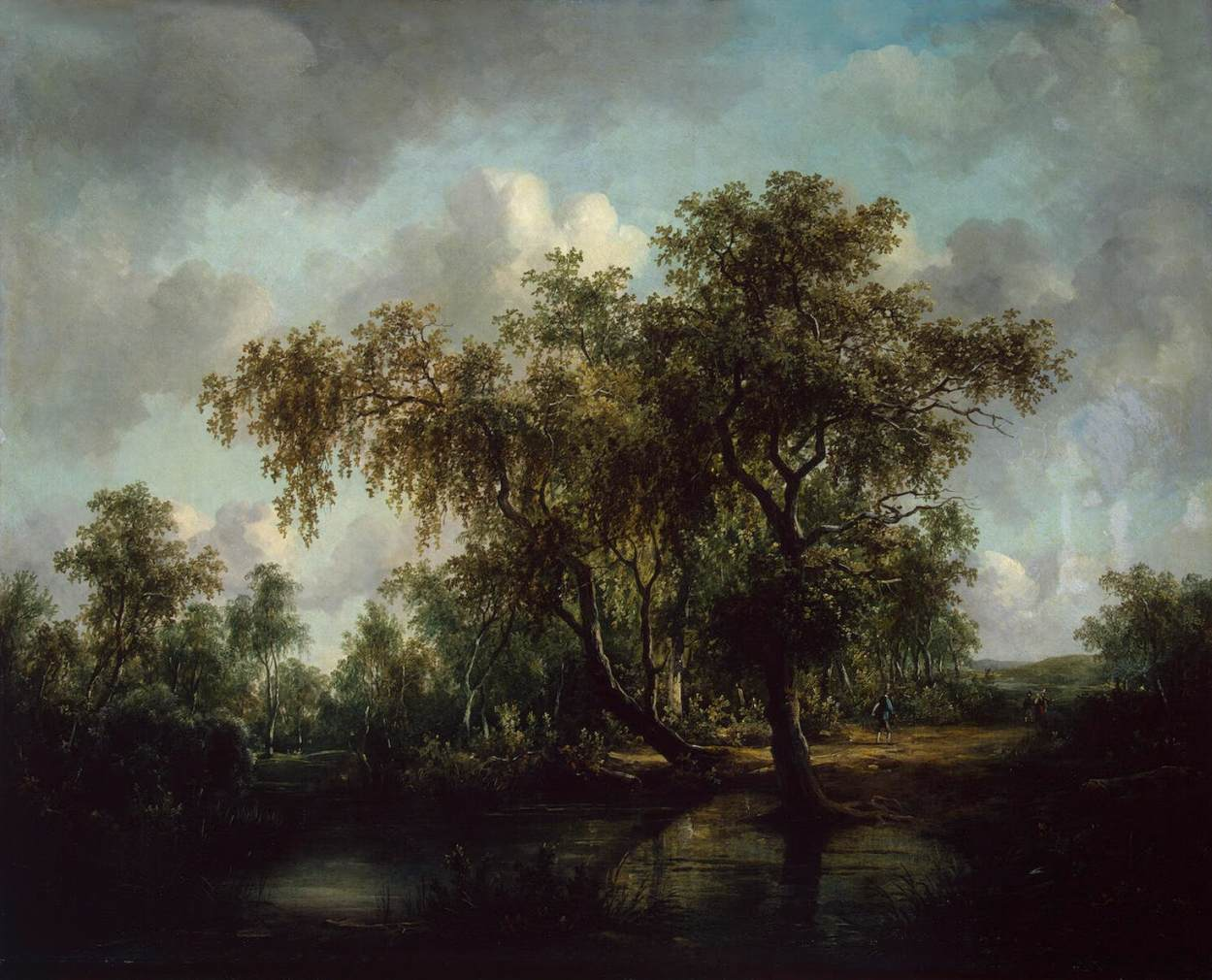
Landscape with a Pond (1815)

Patrick Nasmyth (7 January 1787 – 17 August 1831) was a Scottish landscape painter. He was the eldest son of the artist Alexander Nasmyth.

== Life ==
Nasmyth was one of the eleven children of Barbara and Alexander Nasmyth of Edinburgh. His six sisters—Jane, Barbara, Margaret, Elizabeth, Anne, and Charlotte — were notable artists whilst his younger brother, James, was a prominent engineer who invented the steam hammer. Nasmyth was born in Edinburgh and was named after his father's patron, Patrick Miller. He developed an affinity for art at an early age. He and his siblings were all given art lessons. His father was keen to see that they were independent. As a teenager Nasmyth lost the use of his right hand following an accident, forcing him to learn how to paint with his left. He also lost most of his hearing through illness.

Much of Nasmyth's work, a great deal of which is undated, depicts his native Scotland, which he continued to paint even after moving to London in 1810. Like his father, he was heavily influenced by the Dutch masters of the 17th century, particularly Meindert Hobbema and Jacob van Ruysdael (a large number of works by both men were displayed in London galleries during Nasmyth's lifetime).

Nasmyth died of pneumonia-like symptoms, which he contracted shortly after painting a scene just outside London.

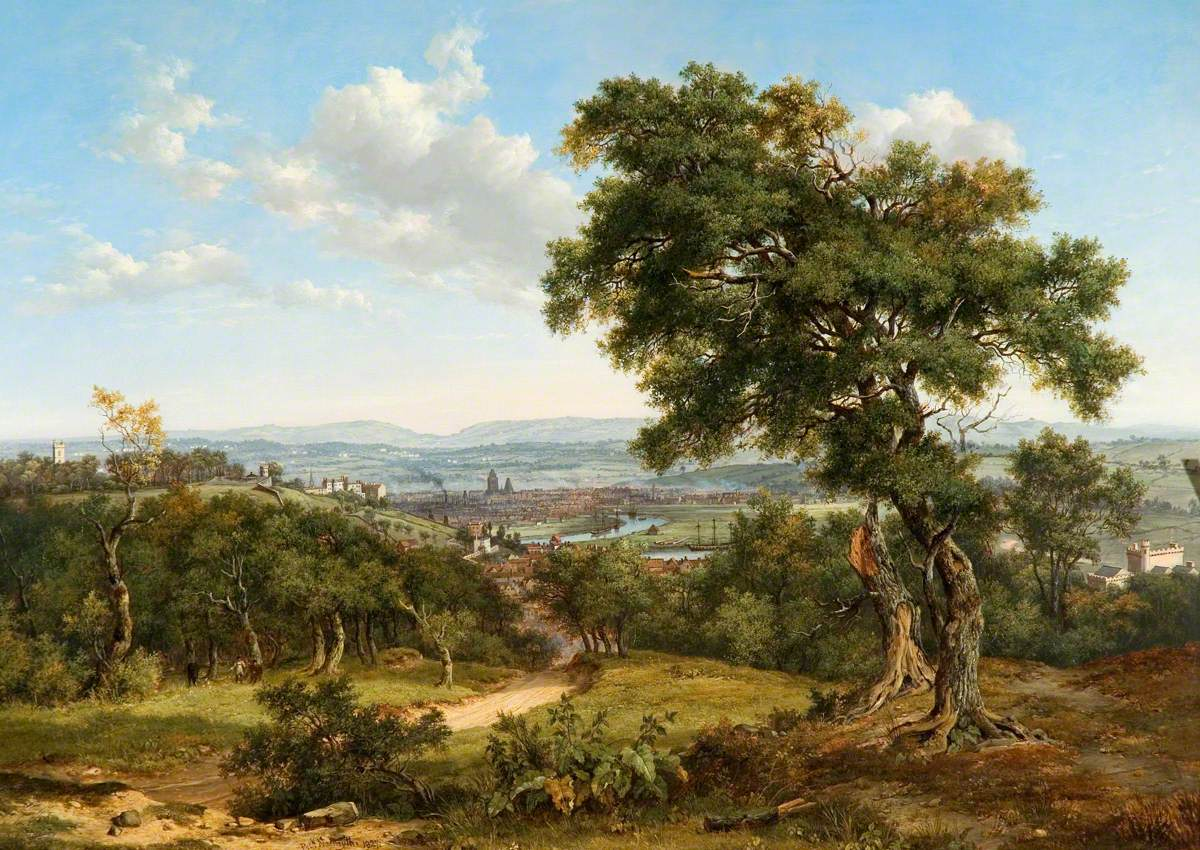
View of Bristol, 1827
