= Anne Nasmyth =

Scottish artist (1798–1874)

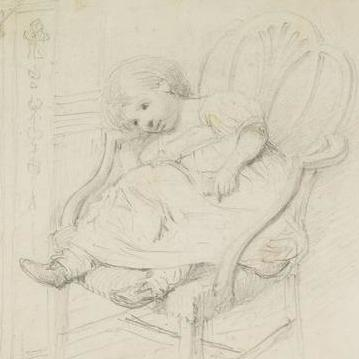
- Anne as a child by her father
- Born: Anne Gibson Nasmyth; 13 November 1798; Edinburgh
- Died: 28 January 1874 (aged 75)
- Other names: Anne Bennett
- Known for: Painting
- Spouse: William Bennett
- Parent(s): Barbara and Alexander Nasmyth

Anne Bennett (née Anne Gibson Nasmyth; 13 November 1798 – 28 January 1874) was a teacher and a painter from the artistic Nasmyth family of Edinburgh. She was not the most exhibited daughter but has been considered the "best painter in this talented family". After the death of her parents her house in Putney became the centre of her extended Nasmyth family.

== Life ==
Nasmyth was born on 13 November 1798 to Alexander and Barbara (née Foulis) Nasmyth in Princes Street in Edinburgh. Her father was an engineer and a very successful artist who was taking on commissions not only for paintings but also for theatre scenery in both Edinburgh and London. The family operated a painting school in Edinburgh and in time a school in London. She was one of eleven children who were taught to draw and paint by their father. Alexander was keen that their daughters would be able to contribute to the family business and to be independent. Two of her brothers, Patrick and James painted but James was also a notable inventor and engineer. Anne and five of her sisters became notable painters. The Nasmyth painting school in Edinburgh was managed by the six sisters with the eldest, Jane, taking the lead. The school attracted young women and they were taught to paint and they would be taken on sketching trips to picturesque spots.

Her sister Elizabeth was married to the actor Daniel Terry and he died in 1829. The same year Anne began to help with classes in London at her sister, Elizabeth's house in Portland Place. In 1831 Anne spent time with her brothers, James and George, as they started out in their careers as engineers in Manchester. Here she met an engineer named William Bennett.

Anne was not as productive at exhibiting her work as her other sisters but she did exhibit a painting at the Royal Academy, Royal Society of British Artists, Royal Hibernian Academy, Royal Scottish Academy and the British Institution.

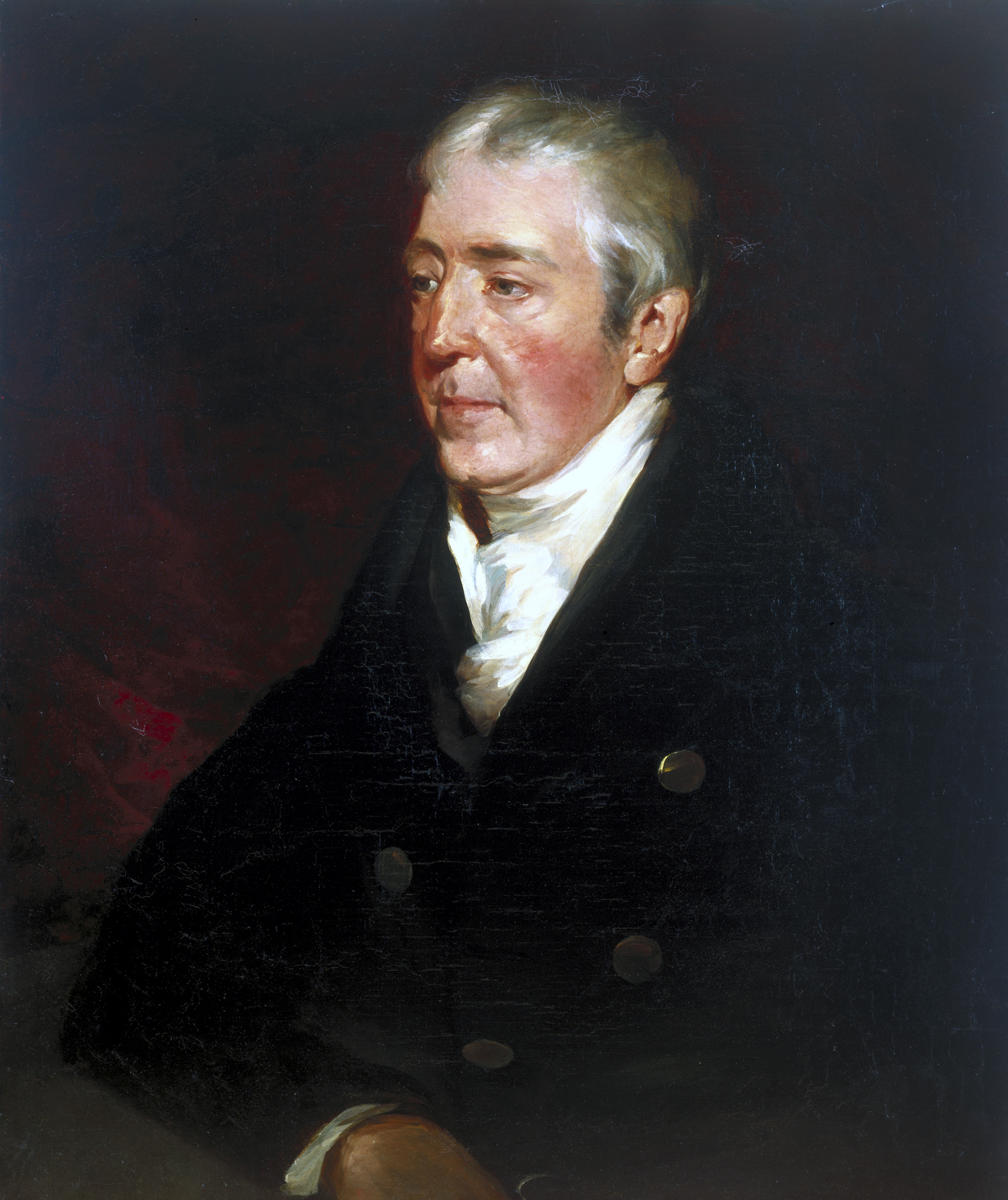
Alexander Nasmyth by Anne Nasmyth after Geddes

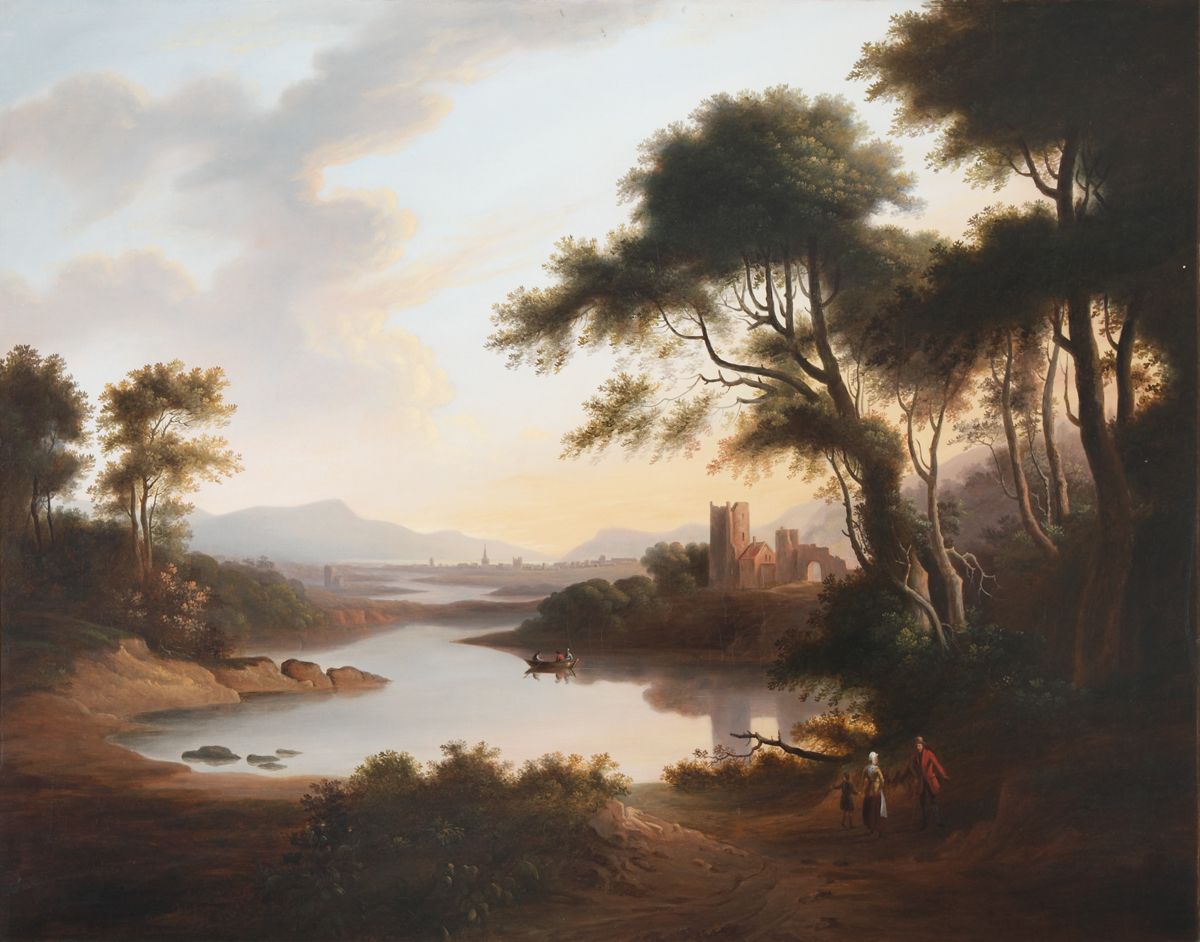
River Landscape by Nasmyth

Her paintings were of the Scottish countryside frequently including harsh weather. Her "A.Nasmyth" or "Anne Nasmyth" works also included in her repertoire pictures of flowers and gardens. In 1836 Anne and her sisters Jane and Charlotte had a flat in Regent Street in London. Elizabeth remarried, Charles Richardson, in 1835. She continued to teach at Elizabeth's house until 1838 when she married William Bennett in St Pancras church. They went to Italy for their honeymoon and set up their home in Salford. William Bennett ensured her brother's fortune when he lent him the money to patent his steam hammer. In 1840 her father died and her mother and unmarried sisters moved out. In 1851 Anne and William moved to Putney in London. Their house in Charlwood Road became a new social centre for the extended Nasmyth family. Anne's mother had died in 1847 and all of her unmarried sisters moved to Putney. In fact at one point Elizabeth and her husband also moved to live locally so all of the sisters were again living closely together.

== Death and legacy ==
William died in 1866 and he was buried in a cemetery in Putney that would in time contain four of Anne's sisters and Anne herself after she died on 28 January 1874. Some of Anne's paintings are owned by the National Trust. There are paintings at Hartwell House and Anglesey Abbey. Anne is considered to be the "best painter in the Nasmyth family".
