= Buchanan Street =

Street in Glasgow, Scotland

Coordinates: 55°51′38.46″N 4°15′14.8″W

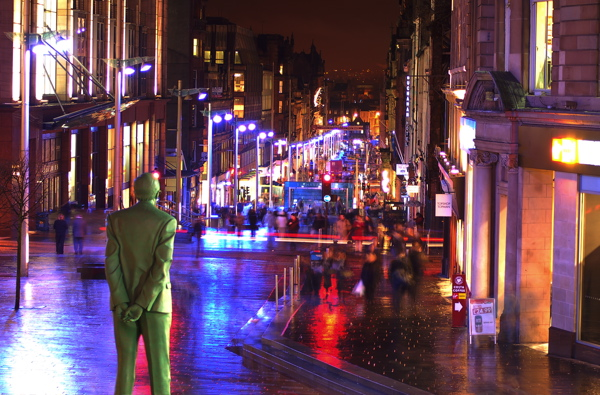
- Buchanan Street at night looking southwards, with the Donald Dewar statue overlooking.
- Interactive map of Buchanan Street
- Type: Commercial
- Maintained by: Glasgow City Council
- Length: 0.5 mi (0.80 km); 11.4º from north
- Location: Glasgow
- Postal code: G1
- Nearest Glasgow Subway station: Buchanan Street Station

Other
- Known for: Glasgow Royal Concert Hall, Buchanan Galleries, Princes Square, House of Fraser and Argyll Arcade.

Buchanan Street is one of the main shopping thoroughfares in Glasgow, Scotland. It forms the central stretch of Glasgow's famous shopping district with a generally more upmarket range of shops than the neighbouring streets: Argyle Street, and Sauchiehall Street.

== History ==
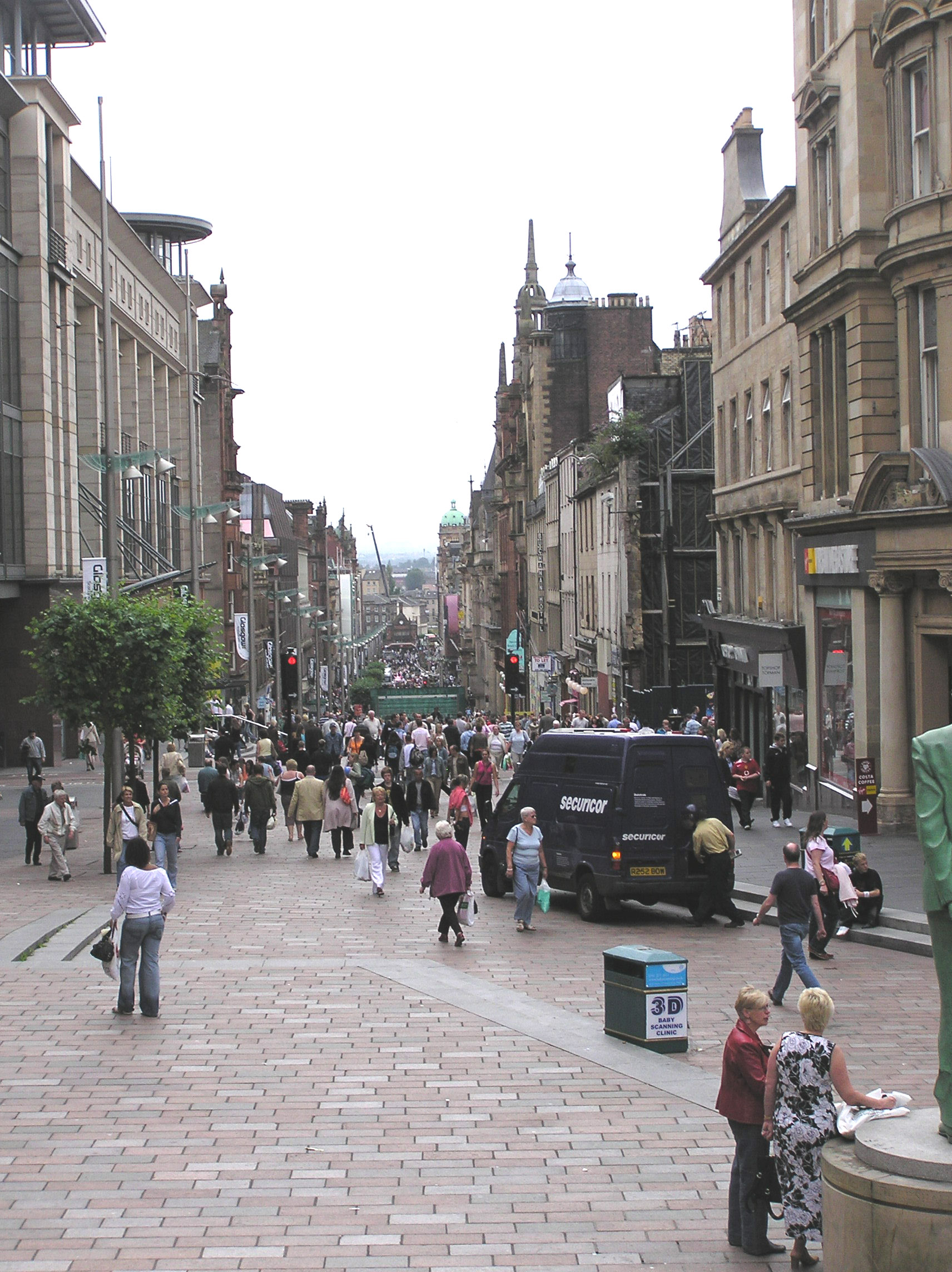
Buchanan Street looking southward towards Argyle Street and the River Clyde. The green glass entrance to Buchanan Street subway station is visible midway.

Buchanan Street was first feued in 1777 and named after a wealthy Tobacco Lord, plantation owner and former Lord Provost of Glasgow, Andrew Buchanan of Buchanan, Hastie, & Co. He was proprietor of the ground on which it was formed from Argyle Street up to today's Gordon Street. Andrew had died in 1759 and his tobacco empire was inherited by his son James Buchanan of Drumpellier (also twice Lord Provost of Glasgow). The family made huge losses following the American Revolution of 1776, losing all their plantations in Virginia. The family members moved into textile manufacturing and industrial expansion. Sale of the land was probably at least in part to offset these initial losses. Palladian villas, similar to those of the 18th century in Argyle Street, Miller Street and Queen Street were erected along with other terraced townhouses from the 1790s onwards, similar to the new George Square and new Royal Exchange Square. Shops, hotels, banks, offices and clubs soon followed including the Western Club and the Athenaeum, later known as the Royal Scottish Academy of Music & Drama, linking through from St George's Place. West of Buchanan Street the classical New Town of Blythswood was started around 1800, developed by William Harley and rising up Blythswood Hill to Blythswood Square.

The land around the north and northeast of Buchanan Street, heading towards Port Dundas on the canal, became home to Buchanan Street railway station serving northern Scotland, the first railway terminal in the city-centre. Originally owned by the Caledonian Railway, then the London Midland and Scottish Railway and finally British Railways, it closed in 1966 and the area now contains Glasgow Caledonian University. Glasgow Queen Street station, serving the east and north of Scotland, and west to Helensburgh, Oban and Fort William, is immediately east of Buchanan Street at the corner of George Square, and the Buchanan Street station on the Glasgow Subway (which also serves Queen Street Station) is underneath the top half of Buchanan Street. The St. Enoch station of the subway is at the foot of Buchanan Street in St Enoch Square.

A Glasgow branch of the NAAFI was constructed at the intersection of Sauchiehall Street in 1953, but was not a financial success and closed just seven years later – the building becoming a casino for the Stakis organization which it remained until the 1980s. Buchanan Bus Station was opened nearby the top of the street in 1977, at the same time as the street itself was pedestrianised between Bath Street and Argyle Street. The northern section of the street underwent significant regeneration in the late 1980s when the demolition of the former NAAFI building at the intersection took place in 1988 to allow for the construction of the Glasgow Royal Concert Hall, opening in 1990, and the adjoining Buchanan Galleries shopping mall, which began construction in 1995 and opened in 1999. Both these new buildings spelled the final end for Parliamentary Road – the main easterly thoroughfare into neighbouring Townhead. Also in 1999, the entire street was repaved with high quality granite stonework and blue neon lighting. The combination of impressive Victorian architecture and modern urban design won Buchanan Street the Academy of Urbanism "Great Street Award" 2008, beating both O'Connell Street in Dublin and Regent Street/Portland Place, London. The area between Argyle Street and St. Vincent Street is particularly popular with buskers.

In May 2002, then-Prime Minister Tony Blair unveiled a statue of the late-First Minister of Scotland Donald Dewar at the northern end of the street, the only statue in the street. On the west side across from Buchanan Galleries a further major development of shops and housing opened in 2013 stretching through to West Nile Street at Bath Street.

== Location ==
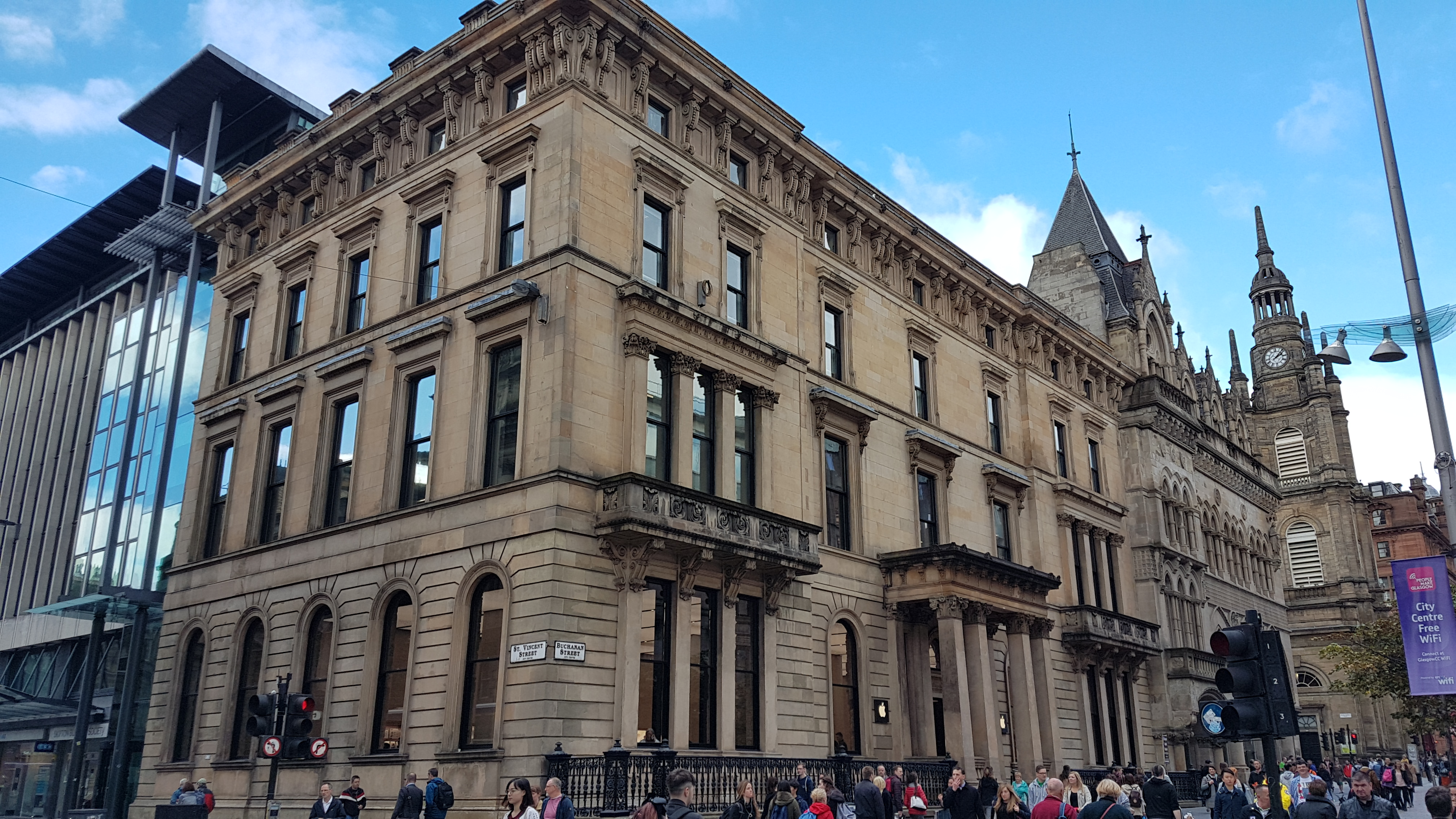
The original Western Club building in Buchanan Street, Glasgow

At the start of the street where it meets Argyle Street and St Enoch Square the historic Argyll Arcade which opened in 1827 with sixty-three shops and is now the oldest Victorian shopping centre in Britain, and its near neighbour award-winning Princes Square indoor mall face across to the stores which make up the iconic House of Fraser – which started in Glasgow and also owned Harrods of London. Buchanan Street is now entirely pedestrianised, but the streets that cross it (St. Vincent Street, George Street and Bath Street) are not.

In the middle, Royal Exchange Square opens out through to Queen Street. Buchanan Street is met by Nelson Mandela Place, which was renamed by the Labour city council from St George's Place, the address of the South African Consulate, as a protest to the African National Congress (ANC) activist Nelson Mandela being a political prisoner of the South African apartheid government at the time. On his release, Glasgow was the first city in the United Kingdom to honour him with the Freedom of the City, October 1993.

Buchanan Street is joined here by St George's-Tron Church and the Glasgow Stock Exchange building, and Royal Exchange Square, which now houses the Gallery of Modern Art.

At its north end, meeting Sauchiehall Street, are the Buchanan Galleries and the Glasgow Royal Concert Hall, which includes the home of the Royal Scottish National Orchestra.

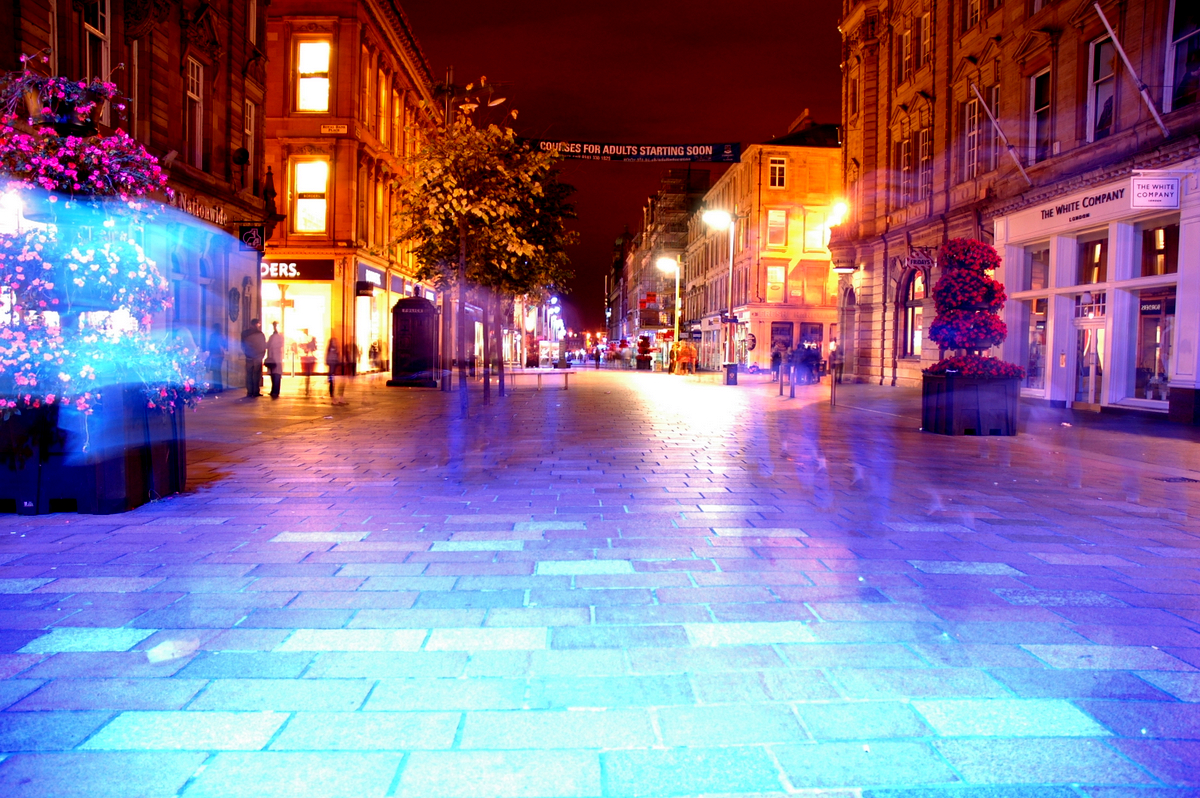
Buchanan Street at night, looking southwards at St. Vincent Street.

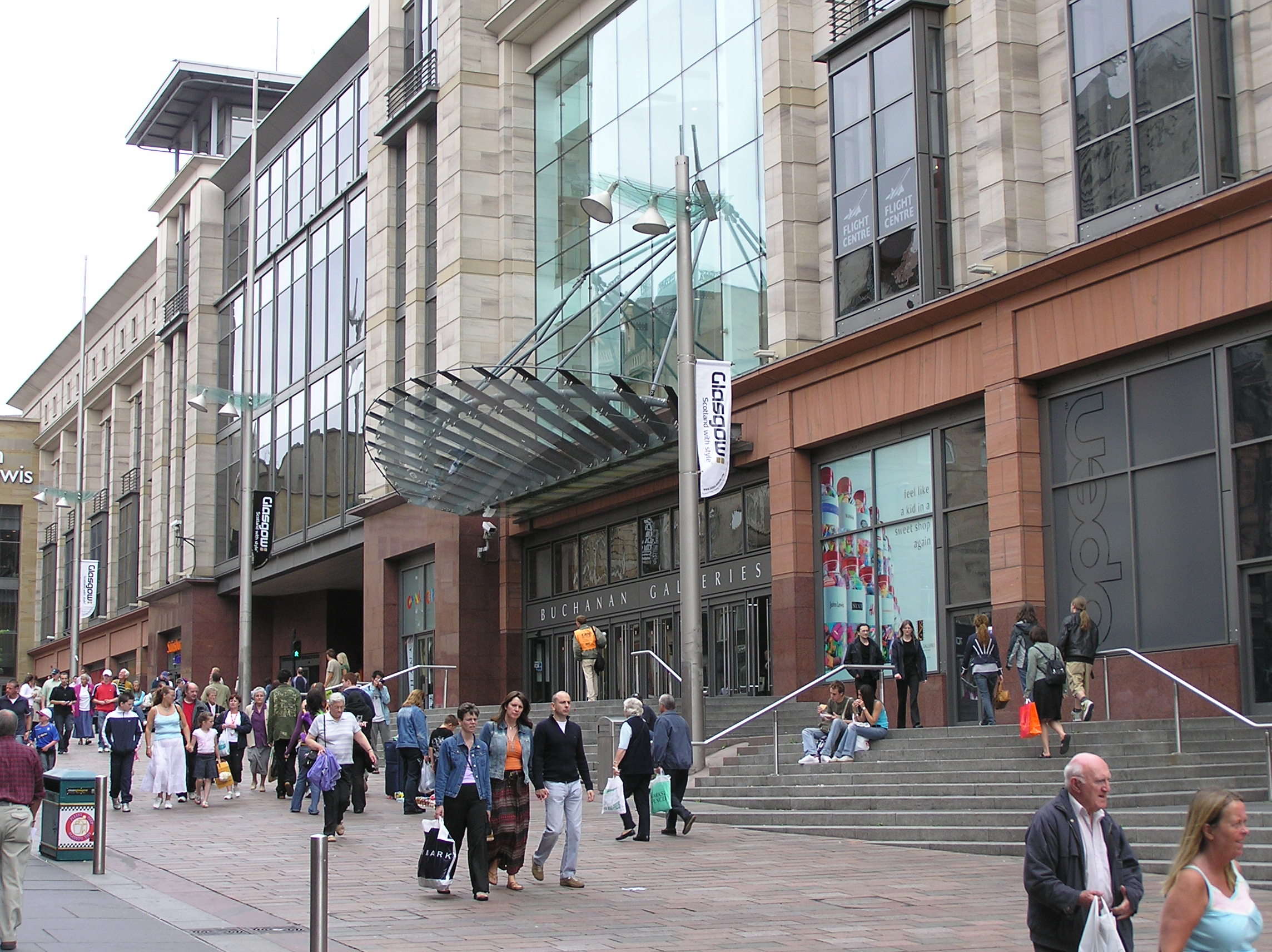
Buchanan Galleries, located at the north end of Buchanan Street.

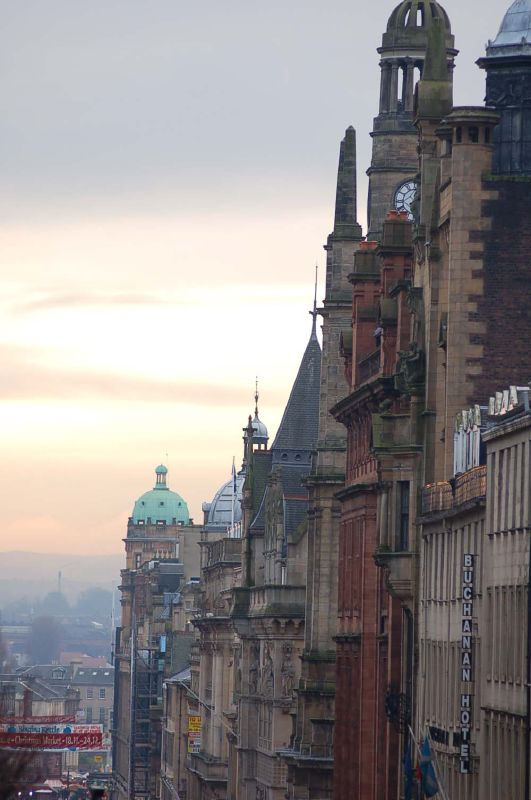
Buchanan Street is renowned for Victorian architecture.

== Retail ==
Buchanan Street is renowned for its variety in high street shopping, including flagship stores, with rents on the street being as much as £250 per square foot (£2,700 per square metre), making it the sixth most expensive street in the United Kingdom for retail rent, only surpassed by five streets in London. Buchanan Street is also the second busiest shopping thoroughfare, second only to Oxford Street in London. Glasgow has been recognised for being the second best shopping destination in the United Kingdom, after London, since 2008.

In 2022, plans were announced to demolish the Buchanan Galleries shopping centre (built in 1999) and create new streets and a mixed use development comprising residential, retail and business properties; however, these plans had been revised by 2024.

== Culture ==
- Glasgow Royal Concert Hall
- Gallery of Modern Art (GoMA) in Royal Exchange Square
- The Lighthouse Centre for Architecture, Design and the City, is located off Buchanan Street, on Mitchell Lane.
