= Glasgow Royal Concert Hall =

Concert hall in Glasgow City, Scotland

- Glasgow International Concert Hall
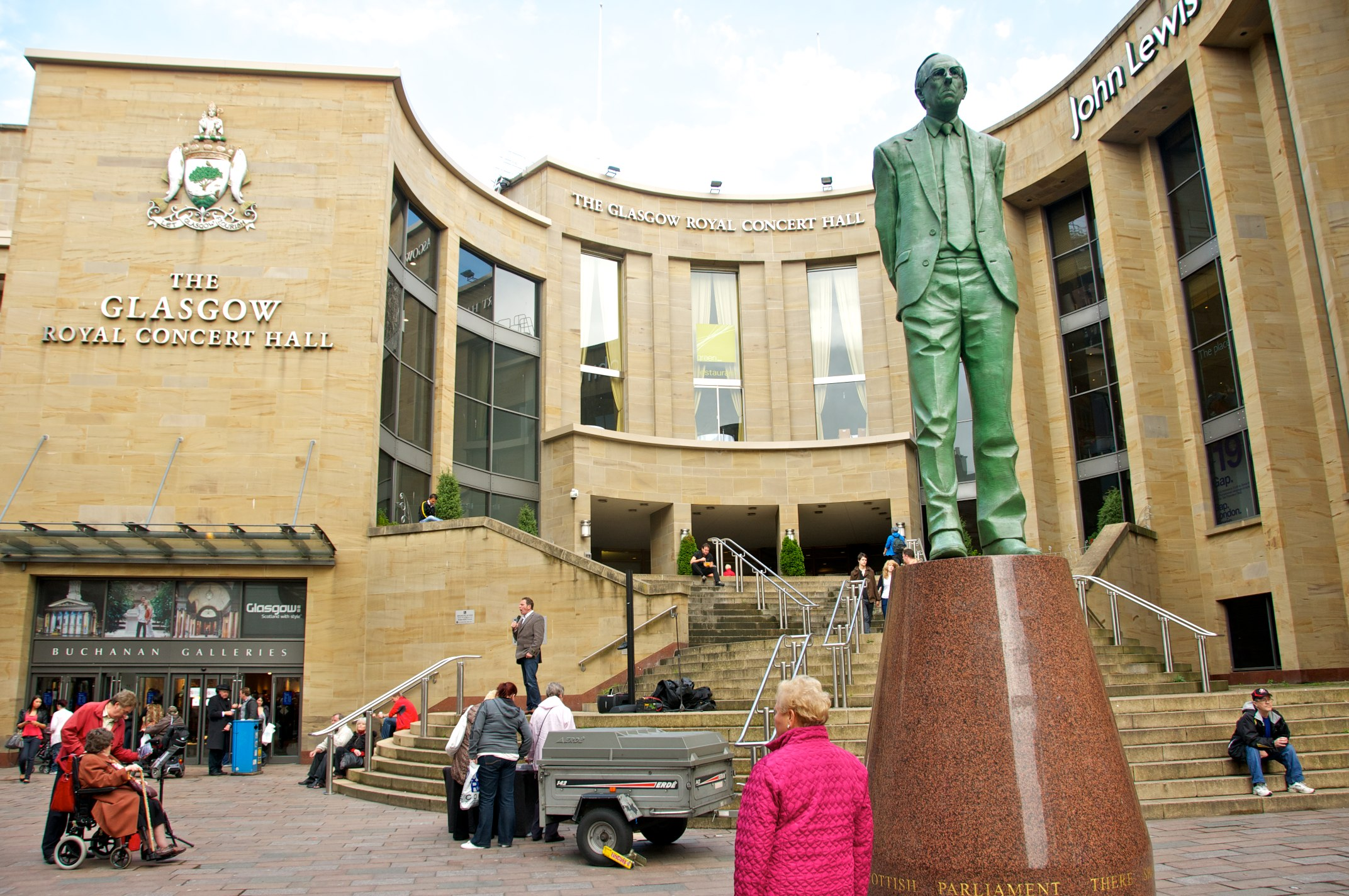
- Front facade of the Glasgow Royal Concert Hall, with the Donald Dewar statue in the foreground
- Interactive map of Glasgow Royal Concert Hall
- Address: 2 Sauchiehall Street G2 3NY
- Location: Glasgow, Scotland
- Coordinates: 55.864503°N 4.252921°W
- Owner: Glasgow City Council
- Operator: Glasgow's Concert Halls
- Capacity: 2,475 (Main Auditorium); 500 (Strathclyde Suite); 300 (Lomond Foyer); 300 (Clyde Foyer); 300 (Exhibition Hall); 120 (Buchanan Suite)
- Type: Concert hall

Construction
- Opened: 1990
- Years active: 1990–present
- Architect: Sir Leslie Martin

Website
- www.glasgowconcerthalls.com

Glasgow Royal Concert Hall is a concert and arts venue located in Glasgow, Scotland. It is owned by Glasgow City Council and operated by Glasgow Life, an agency of Glasgow City Council, which also runs Glasgow's City Halls and Old Fruitmarket venue. The structure forms a major part of a building complex which incorporates the Buchanan Galleries shopping mall.

== History ==
Built as the Glasgow International Concert Hall, the Royal Concert Hall is one of the largest halls in the United Kingdom. It was granted Royal status shortly before it was officially opened on 5 October 1990 at a gala performance attended by Anne, Princess Royal.

It is the replacement for the acclaimed St. Andrew's Hall, adjacent to the Mitchell Library, which had been destroyed by fire in 1962 (the remains of St Andrew's Hall was later incorporated into the 1970s extension of the Mitchell Library), whilst the new Concert Hall was promoted and constructed in time for the city being recognised in the 1980s as the European City of Culture. The Concert Hall stands at the junction of Buchanan Street, Sauchiehall Street and the former Parliamentary Road, which the building stands partially atop. The entire complex, which includes the adjoining Buchanan Galleries shopping mall which was constructed in the late 1990s – was built over a former residential area which was demolished as part of the "comprehensive development" of Townhead and Cowcaddens in the 1960s.

The building incorporates a performers` entrance in West Nile Street, and public entrances in Buchanan street and in Killermont Street, with the RSNO Centre added in later years. The auditorium area is insulated by a massive rubber membrane built into the floor – damping out noise and vibration from the Subway tracks which run underneath.

The Glasgow International Concert Hall was officially opened on 5 October 1990 by Her Royal Highness The Princess Royal. The Royal Scottish National Orchestra (then the Scottish National Orchestra) gave the very first performance at the Royal Gala Opening Concert, as a showpiece for Glasgow being awarded the European City of Culture. The programme featured two new works by Scottish composers, Carillon by Thomas Wilson and Rainbow 90 by Thea Musgrave, both specially commissioned for the occasion by Glasgow City Council, as well as pieces by Beethoven and Vaughan Williams. On the day prior, public concerts were given by the Band of Her Majesty's Royal Marines, with proceeds being donated to the RNLI, which also demonstrated how the stage and the floor levels can be changed to suit performances. The first non-classical concert was by The Blue Nile. The hall has been granted Royal Status and renamed Glasgow Royal Concert Hall.

== Architecture ==
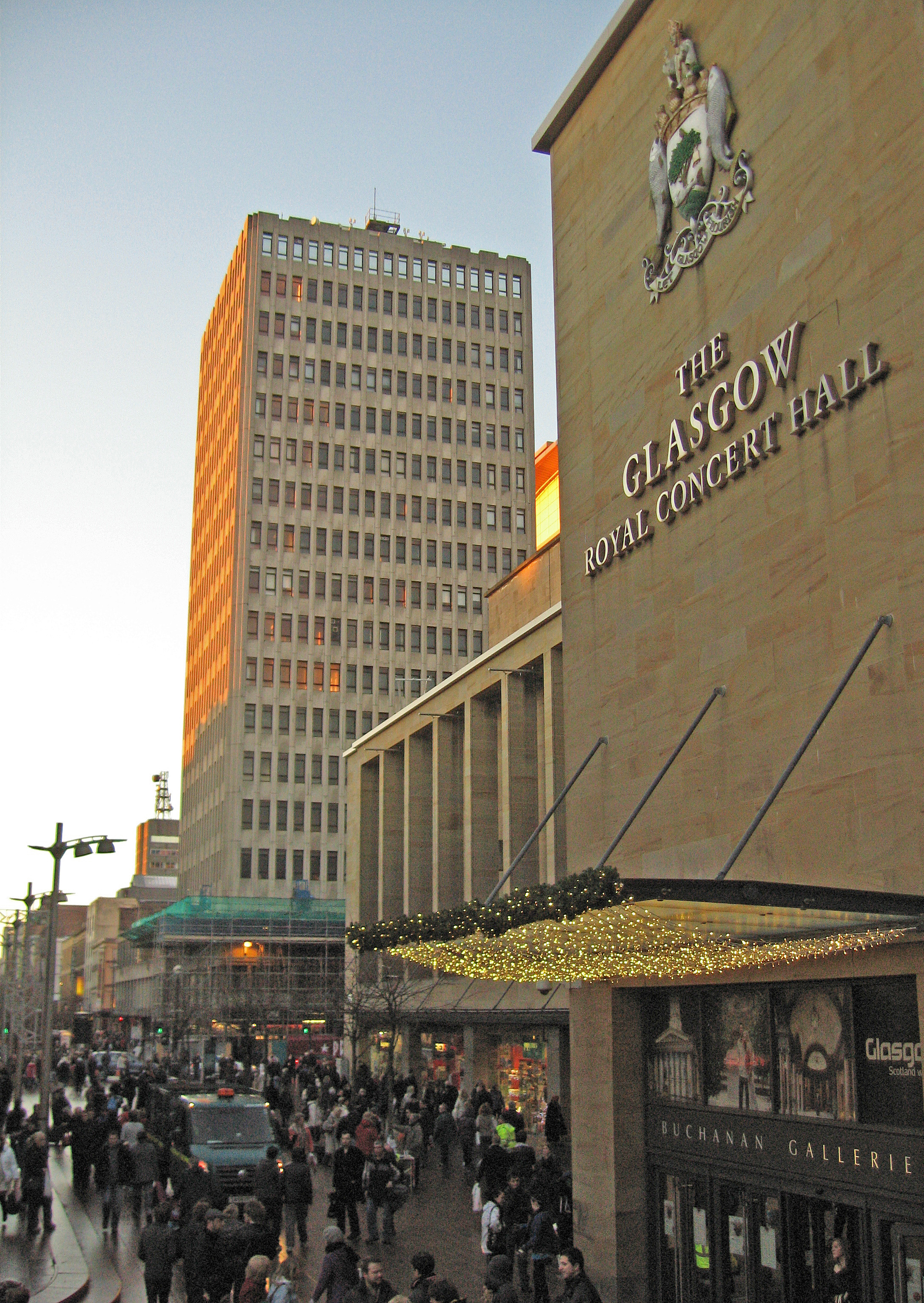
The Glasgow Royal Concert Hall sign, adjacent to the entrance on Sauchiehall Street

The building was designed by modernist architect Sir Leslie Martin of South Bank, London, with some of the conceptual ideas for the building dating as far back as the mid 1960s. Some of the basic thinking behind the scheme had been directly influenced by the Bruce Report, which had proposed dividing the city centre up into distinct zones for various types of activity once slum housing had been cleared. In 1964, Glasgow Corporation had already envisioned a new civic square which would be created following the planned closure and demolition of Buchanan Street railway station (which by this time had been decided as part of the Beeching Cuts). The new square would effectively be a superblock created by realigning Parliamentary Road to an approximate east-west axis (making it essentially an extension of Renfrew Street), and also realigning North Hanover Street so it ran directly north-south. Conceptual drawings from the period showed that the square would have looked very similar to Lincoln Center in New York City, containing an art gallery, civic theatre, concert hall and repertory theatre.

With Leslie Martin appointed as project architect, later plans showed that the proposed new technical college along the north side of the site on Cowcaddens Road would occupy part of the site – this would eventually be built as Glasgow College of Technology (now Glasgow Caledonian University) in 1971. By 1968, the scheme had been revised further and scaled down considerably. A decision to close and consolidate two bus stations (Dundas Street and Killermont Street) into one, resulted in the newly created superblock being used for what would become Buchanan Bus Station in 1976, and the new "civic centre" would move to what would become the ultimate site of the Concert Hall. A multi-story car park was erected on the site of the former railway station building that same year. Even as far back as the late 1960s, Leslie Martin's initial concepts showed familiar aspects of the building that would be recognised today – the extensive use of colonnades (which would only be ultimately used on the north entrance of the building), and the cylindrical shaped entrance on its south facing side, which would be centred on the former intersection of Sauchiehall Street and Parliamentary Road. By the mid 1970s, the first ideas that the eastern edge of the site would be devoted to shops began to appear, but it was not until the 1980s that this began to develop into plans for the giant shopping mall that was eventually built. In 1988, the retailer John Lewis & Partners had signed up as the anchor tenant of the proposed development The "Buchanan Centre" as it was initially called – would adjoin onto the side of the concert hall and John Lewis would occupy half of the mall's planned area, although it would be 1999 before it was finally realised – as the "Buchanan Galleries".

The Edinburgh-based company RMJM and partners were appointed as project architects for the Royal Concert Hall in 1988. Councillor Pat Lally symbolically drove in the first concrete pile of the building in the April of that year.

== Performance spaces and facilities ==
The Main Auditorium is the largest performance space in the Glasgow Royal Concert Hall, and can seat 2475 people. Other spaces in the hall include the 500-capacity Strathclyde Suite, the 300-capacity Exhibition Hall, the 120-capacity Buchanan Suite, the 300-capacity Lomond and Clyde foyers, the 100-capacity Strathclyde Bar, 150-capacity City of Music Studio and the 40-capacity VIP Room. The hall also has a gift shop, five bars and café. It also houses the headquarters of the Royal Scottish National Orchestra.

The Green Room, formerly a fine-dining room, was restyled in 2009 and renamed "The City of Music Studio" to celebrate Glasgow's UNESCO City of Music status. The City of Music Studio is known for the view overlooking Buchanan Street and its late night jazz programme. The Cafe Bar was re-branded and refurbished in 2011 as Café Encore following Encore's takeover of the catering department.

The Royal Scottish National Orchestra recently moved to a purpose-built new home on-site, entered from Killermont Street. At the heart of their new home is an acoustically adjustable, 600-seat auditorium, providing also world-class rehearsal and recording facilities for the Orchestra. The Royal Scottish National Orchestra Centre also houses a dedicated education space, the Robertson Learning and Engagement Centre.

A bespoke four manual Copeman Hart digital organ and associated speakers was permanently installed in the Hall in July 2015.

== Notable events ==
The Hall is the Glasgow performance base of the Royal Scottish National Orchestra and has hosted many international orchestras, soloists and conductors, including the Royal Concertgebouw Orchestra, the St. Petersburg Philharmonic Orchestra, the National Youth Orchestras of Britain and Scotland, the Jazz at Lincoln Center Orchestra, Celia Bartoli, Julian Lloyd Webber and Maxim Vengerov.

As well as classical music, the hall plays host to opera and ballet, musical theatre, talks, rock and pop, folk, world and country, swing and comedy. It also exhibits art and photographic exhibitions, and is the venue for graduation ceremonies for the adjacent Glasgow Caledonian University.

On Sunday 9 October 1993, Nelson Mandela chose Glasgow as the place to formally receive the first of his freedoms of nine British cities. He entered the Hall to a choral rendition of Down by the Riverside and received a standing ovation. In 1994 Bob Hope took to the stage to commemorate the 50th anniversary of the D-Day landings.

The Hall is the main venue for the annual Celtic Connections Festival, and is one of the venues for the city's Aye Write Book Festival.
