= SIMY =

SiMY is a youth and community development project that works alongside young people and their families in Townhead and the surrounding areas of Glasgow City Centre. SiMY predominantly works with 8- to 18-year-olds, and most of this work takes place in the outdoors. Although SiMY's youth activity program is driven by the aims and aspirations of the young people, it typically includes physical and mental wellbeing games, hillwalking, swimming, climbing, biking, forest bathing, arts, crafts, and music. While these activities might sound like fun, they have a serious side, focussing on five interconnected development areas: mental wellbeing, physical wellbeing, self-confidence and self-expression, building social skills and reducing social isolation, and nurturing a sense of agency. SiMY's focus on outdoor youth work, draws on the Scandinavian concept of ‘friluftsliv’; outdoor living, in order to give participants the maximum exposure to the proven mental and physical health benefits of spending time in natural green, and blue, spaces.

== History ==
SiMY was started in 1999 by Norman McNeish, Tony Sargent and Neil Pratt, the then head of the youth work department of the International Christian College, when ICC moved to a new building in Townhead. The staff noticed there was very little for young people to do and found a lot of young people congregated in the area behind their building. SiMY developed in response to this need and the club was set up in partnership with local young people, and has continued to develop, grow, and change in response to their interests, aims and aspirations.

The project was formalized in 2004 as a partnership between the International Christian College, The Church of Scotland through Martyrs Church in Townhead and Operation Mobilisation's LifeHope.

After the change to focusing on Townhead, SiMY rebuilt, first through a Detached Youth work project, but quickly added back in youth clubs when the police and residence noticed an increase in antisocial behaviour due to the lack of things for young people to do and places for them to meet. The project grew by working with the International Christian College youth work degree course, the local community police, the Prince's Youth Trust (PYT), Glasgow Community Safety Services, St Roch Secondary school and Glasgow Life. In 2009 they had grown to successfully providing work place development posts for four youth work students from ICC and placements for two students from Anniesland College. Placements included experience in schools work, detached youth work, open youth clubs, residential work as well as specific projects that nourished particular interests of the young people. All students placed in this project have gone on to successful youth work careers.

In 2011 the SiMY volunteer held a review to respond to the 2010 Community Audit of the area conducted by the church of Scotland Glasgow presbytery in conjunction with SiMY. The report highlighted much needs of the area. SiMY has formed as a separate charity. With the support of a consultant from the "Community enterprise trust", they are building the capacity of the new organisation.

In 2012 both the Church of Scotland and the International Christian college removed support for Townhead. Both organization sold off their buildings in the area. Both the community building and land (church) and ICC building are now high density student housing.

In 2013 the new Townhead Village Hall (TVHP) opened after 10 years of work which SiMY was involved in providing the youth voice and community audits for. The hall could not meet the capacity needed of new Townhead which had lost 4 community spaces over the period. The TVHP committee have dedicated, one room for one evening a week to youth work for Townhead young people. This is run by Glasgow life. SiMY moved to rebuild a new way of providing youth work through outdoor play, outdoor activities and partnerships with local businesses to provide arts.

In 2014, with help of a local business man, SiMY moved into a former Taxi showroom to attempt to generate the income needed to provide the much needed space for development youth work. The main "business" being developed is the Bike Station Academy. A social enterprise to recycle old bikes and bike parts to sell cheaply and City and Guides training for local young people needing jobs.

The youth work program has also developed. Outdoor pursuits such as walking, climbing, biking and kayaking; community sport; visual arts, dance and music with options to get credit for your activities through the DofE program (Glasgow Life) and Arts Award programs (Toonspeak and Glasgow Life).

== Current activities ==
All of SiMY's youth activities take place on Lister Street Bowling Greens, in Townhead:

- Monday - Kids Club (8yrs-P5) - 4pm-5:30pm
- Tuesday - Primary Contact Group (P6-P7) - 4pm-5:30pm
- Wednesday - Young Adults Contact Group (S4-S6) - 5pm-7pm
- Thursday - Secondary Contact Group (S1-S3) - 5pm-7pm
- Weekends: Various Mini-Adventures throughout the year
- School Holiday Programmes: Holiday programmes are run during Easter, Summer, and the October break

SiMY receive's support from volunteers from around Townhead and Glasgow, Tiso, Endura Life Cycle Trust, Bike for Good, Snowcamp Scotland and local business. Each organisation brings different actives and opportunities for young people including music class, sports coaching, meeting spaces and life skills. There are addition specific support like the Exam support program, CV & application support. In St Roch school the team works with teachers with their DofE program.

SiMY attends the Townhead Community Council, the community partnership, the area youth work partnership and the north west youth partnership. Through this young people get involved in the different developmental initiatives in the area.

Every year the volunteers and young people take time away in short activity breaks and activity weeks. The focus of these residential is living together in community. In 2009 /2010 this activity took place at GlenKin near Dunoon. The SiMY team returned, in 2011, to running its residential programs in Aviemore at the Cairngorm Christian Centre in Kincraig. In 2012 partnership with the Iona Community added residential weeks to Camas and activities to achieve the John Muir Award.

== Young people lead projects ==
- Just Climb. In 2016 a group of young people lead a successful community budget campaign with the CPP to allow them to launch a climbing club in Townhead for Townhead young people.
- Break Dance. A project led by two talented young dancer to bring Breaking dance and links to Y'Dance for teenager from his school and area. The group have already worked with AplusM training to get their group to Y'Dance's destinations weekend. They are now looking for opportunities to expand the groups experience and skills with AplusM's help.

== About the community ==
The SiMY community is mainly staffed by local volunteers. Most are young people who have grown up through the project or people who work in the Townhead area. This team of volunteers provide a stable base for statutory sector groups or activity based program providers to work with young people when they have the funding by joining in with the team. The team are made up from a diverse group of people. Although the heart of the project community are Christians, there is no need to be a Christian to be part of the community.

The community is dedicated to the training of youth work professionals and continual personal development of its volunteers. The team apply a reflective cycle approach to youth work provision and response to the community of young people.

Young people volunteer in the community working on ideas they have for improving their community. In each management committee that has developed, 2 young people are invited on to the committee.

== Research and development activity ==
2007–2008 – Research work includes "Breaking the cycle" action research into Townhead's young people response to alcohol and the driving force behind the continuing use and misuse of alcohol in Townhead. A report that highlights key ways forward for shaping a youth work response that can break the cycle.

"Young people's response to the village hall project",

"2008 Community Audit".

2009 - Young people's needs from the Village Hall Project.

"Developmental comparison study between Townhead Martyrs church and Robroyston church of Scotland youth work provision"

2008 and beyond – SiMY has secured a small grant to investigate how other small churches can use partnerships to meet the youth work needs of a community. The work with Robroyston Parish Church has led to their own "Hub" beginning and one of the student volunteers, Sam Goncalves being employed as their youth worker.

2010 – Developing young people's abilities through youth work in the outdoors. The team worked with the church of Scotland in a pilot study of the part outdoor education can play in developing young people and youth work. Through this study they launch the Glen Kin Experience. A bothy style holiday and training experience for young people. The study was for the Church of Scotland's Priority Area's fund and is now fully launched. It provides holidays for a select number of churches in the most deprived areas of Scotland. The project employed its first full-time worker Alex Bauer, 2011 and is adding more sessional staff in the summer of 2011.

2010 - "An option for the young" - part of the CofS focus group looking at the work of SiMY and Glenkin

2010 Deep Impact

2012 Community Audit, done in conjunction with the Glasgow Transformation Team.

2014 Health and social cohesion benefits of youth work in the outdoors local to your community (ongoing)

Young people and their community voice

2015 Craftivism in conjunction with the Iona Community

2016 What makes a fairer Scotland? In partnership with GlasgowLife.
