= 900 Edinburgh–Glasgow =

Bus route between Edinburgh and Glasgow, Scotland

900
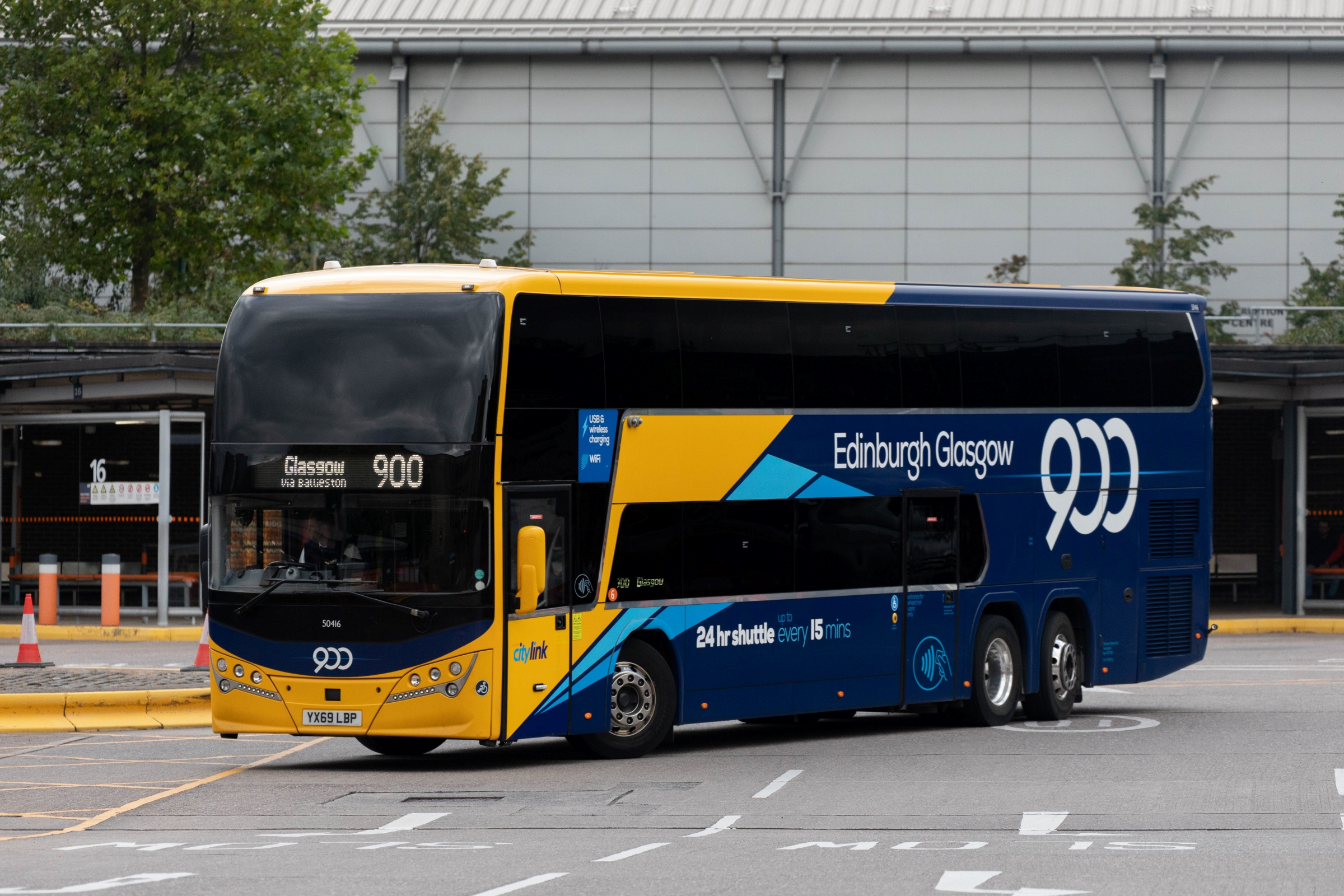
- Plaxton Panorama bodied Volvo B11RLE at Buchanan bus station, Glasgow, in September 2022

Overview
- Operator: Scottish Citylink

Route
- Start: Edinburgh bus station
- Via: Harthill
- End: Buchanan bus station

Service
- Frequency: 12 minutes (peak); 15 minutes (daytime); 30 minutes (evening); 60 minutes (overnight & early morning)

The 900 is a bus service, operated by Scottish Citylink, which runs between Edinburgh and Glasgow.

== History ==
24-hour operation was introduced on 2 October 2017. In January 2020, eighteen double-decker Plaxton Panorama coaches were introduced, replacing the single-deck coaches that previously operated on the route.

== Operation ==
The route is operated under the Scottish Citylink brand, using vehicles supplied by Stagecoach West Scotland and Park's of Hamilton. The 900 operates every 15 minutes during the day, every 30 minutes in the evening, and hourly overnight.

=== Calling points ===
- Edinburgh bus station (night journeys start on St David Street instead)
- Princes Street (West)
- Shandwick Place
- Haymarket railway station
- Wester Coates
- Murrayfield (Ormidale Terrace)
- Murrayfield Road
- Western Corner
- Corstorphine (opposite Edinburgh Zoo)
- Corstorphine (Drum Brae South)
- Maybury (for East Craigs)
- Gogarburn A8 (RBS Gogarburn)
- Edinburgh Airport (night journeys only)
- Airport Hotels (night journeys only)
- Ingliston Road (RHC)
- Ratho Station
- Newbridge (Lochend Road)
- Livingston Deer Park (Knightsridge) (late evening, night and early morning journeys only)
- Heart of Scotland services
- Eurocentral (for Maxim Park) (alternates with Baillieston on daytimes, all calls during evening and night)
- Baillieston (alternates with Eurocentral on daytimes, all calls during evening and night)
- Easterhouse
- Buchanan bus station, Glasgow
