= Buchanan Street railway station =

Former railway station in Glasgow City, Scotland

Buchanan Street
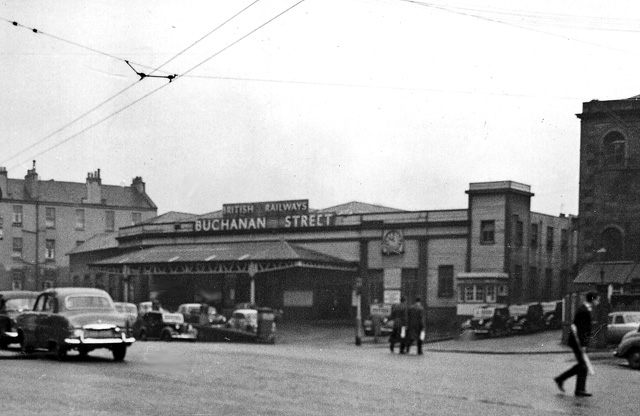
- The station in 1961

General information
- Location: Glasgow, Lanarkshire; Scotland
- Coordinates: 55.8665°N 4.2527°W
- Grid reference: NS590660
- Platforms: 6

Other information
- Status: Demolished

History
- Original company: Caledonian Railway
- Pre-grouping: Caledonian Railway
- Post-grouping: London, Midland and Scottish Railway

Key dates
- 1 November 1849: Opened as terminal station
- 7 November 1966: Closed
Location

Buchanan Street station is a former railway station in Glasgow. Less well known than the city's other terminus stations – Central, Queen Street and St Enoch – it was situated in the Cowcaddens district to the north-west of Queen Street station and served the north of Scotland.

== History ==
Caledonian Railway (Glasgow Station) Act 1848
- Act of Parliament
- Parliament of the United Kingdom
- Long title: An Act to enable the Caledonian Railway Company to extend their Railway across the River Clyde at Glasgow, and to form a Station in that City.
- Citation: 11 & 12 Vict. c. cxxi

Dates
- Royal assent: 14 August 1848

Text of statute as originally enacted

Authorised by the Caledonian Railway (Glasgow Station) Act 1848 (11 & 12 Vict. c. cxxi), and constructed in 1849 by the Caledonian Railway Company as its main terminus for the city, the original station buildings consisted of supposedly temporary wooden structures, which lasted until the 1930s. A goods station at the site opened in 1850. Services ran primarily northbound, to Aberdeen, Perth and Stirling and other destinations.

The station was earmarked for closure and replacement in the "Bruce Report", which made proposals for the redevelopment of Glasgow after the Second World War. The plan included replacing Buchanan Street and Queen Street stations with a Glasgow North station on land including the site of Buchanan Street, but many times larger. There was also a similar scheme to replace Central and St Enoch stations with a Glasgow South station, but neither came to fruition.

This reprieve proved to be temporary, as the station was closed in 1966 as part of the "Beeching Axe" devised by Richard Beeching. The station largely duplicated the function of the more centrally located Queen Street in serving the northern inter-city routes from Glasgow, while the latter also held the advantage of serving the northern electric suburban network as well as having a near-direct interchange with the Glasgow Subway. By contrast, Buchanan Street, with its distant location from the city centre in Cowcaddens, and being located halfway between Cowcaddens and Buchanan Street had no easy or convenient Subway interchange. In addition, the slum clearances of the 1960s in the immediate area had taken away much of the resident population that the station served.

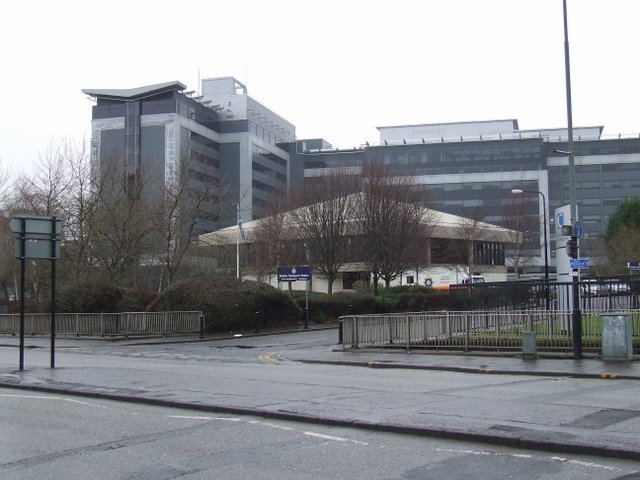
The station site taken from Cowcaddens Road prior to the demolition of Buchanan House (background) in 2025 The smaller white building in the foreground is the British Transport Police HQ, built on the site of the old booking office in 1980

The decision was therefore taken by British Railways to move all of the station's services to Queen Street, despite its smaller physical size and capacity constraints. In 1966, as the station was being wound down, British Rail constructed a massive 8-storey 'L'-shaped office block known as "Buchanan House" on part of the station site to house its Scottish Region headquarters - it was later renamed "ScotRail House" in 1984 to reflect the new ScotRail branding of the Scottish Region. After the privatisation of the railways in the mid 1990s, the building remained the Scottish HQ for the rail infrastructure company Railtrack and its successor Network Rail until 2003.

The closure of the station formed part of a wider programme of regeneration instigated by Glasgow Corporation, who had already earmarked the site for the construction of a new technology college. The removal of the station would allow for a realignment of Cowcaddens Road along with adjacent North Hanover Street and Parliamentary Road to a giant "superblock" into which a new civic square would be created - this was essentially the embryonic version of what would evolve into Glasgow Royal Concert Hall, although this was eventually built farther to the south, and the resulting land used for a new bus station instead.

The station buildings were demolished in 1967, and were eventually replaced by the Glasgow headquarters of the British Transport Police in 1980 which stands directly over the former booking office site. A multi-storey car park and Buchanan Bus Station were built to the south of the station in 1977. The railway lands and goods sidings to the immediate north of the station were given over to the construction of the new Glasgow College of Technology (now Glasgow Caledonian University) in 1971.

The 430 yd (390 m) Buchanan Street tunnel that ran from just outside the station to just beyond the Cowlairs Incline at Sighthill (where the lines merge with those emanating from the Queen Street tunnel) still exists, although the route was severed due to the construction of the M8 motorway at the turn of the 1970s, and the two ends are therefore no longer connected together. The south portal can still be found located behind the campus of Glasgow Caledonian University and Buchanan House, but it is now sealed off and all access is prohibited.

Preceding station	Disused railways	Following station
Terminus	Caledonian Railway; Glasgow, Garnkirk and Coatbridge Railway	St Rollox; Line and station closed

== The site today ==
The former site of the station continued to see changes with further campus buildings constructed as Glasgow Caledonian University expanded in the late 1990s and into the 2000s. Buchanan House was eventually vacated by Network Rail and redeveloped as a general purpose office block - losing its original Brutalist-style cladding in 2003 and replaced with a modern glass curtain wall. However, the building struggled to attract private tenants and had been vacated by 2022. It was demolished in 2025 on account of structural problems and is set to be replaced by a housing development.

Also in 2025, plans were unveiled by Strathclyde Partnership for Transport (SPT) to substantially redevelop Buchanan Bus Station, which will see parts of the site changed yet again - the multi-storey car park constructed in 1977 will be demolished to allow the airspace rights above the bus station to exploited, for possible future housing or office developments.
