= Buchanan bus station =

Bus station in Glasgow, Scotland

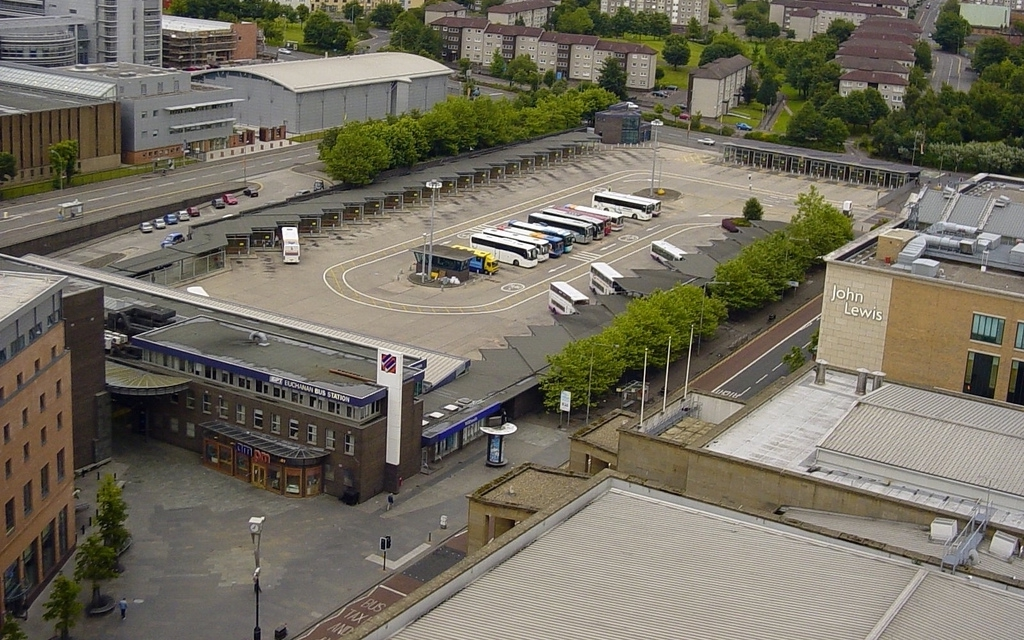
- The bus station in 2006.

General information
- Location: Killermont Street, Glasgow City; Scotland
- Coordinates: 55°51′55″N 4°15′02″W
- Operator: Strathclyde Partnership for Transport
- Bus stands: 57
- Connections: Queen Street; Buchanan Street (200 metres)

History
- Opened: 1977

Passengers
- 12,927,690; 564,553 (departures)
Location
- Location within Glasgow council area

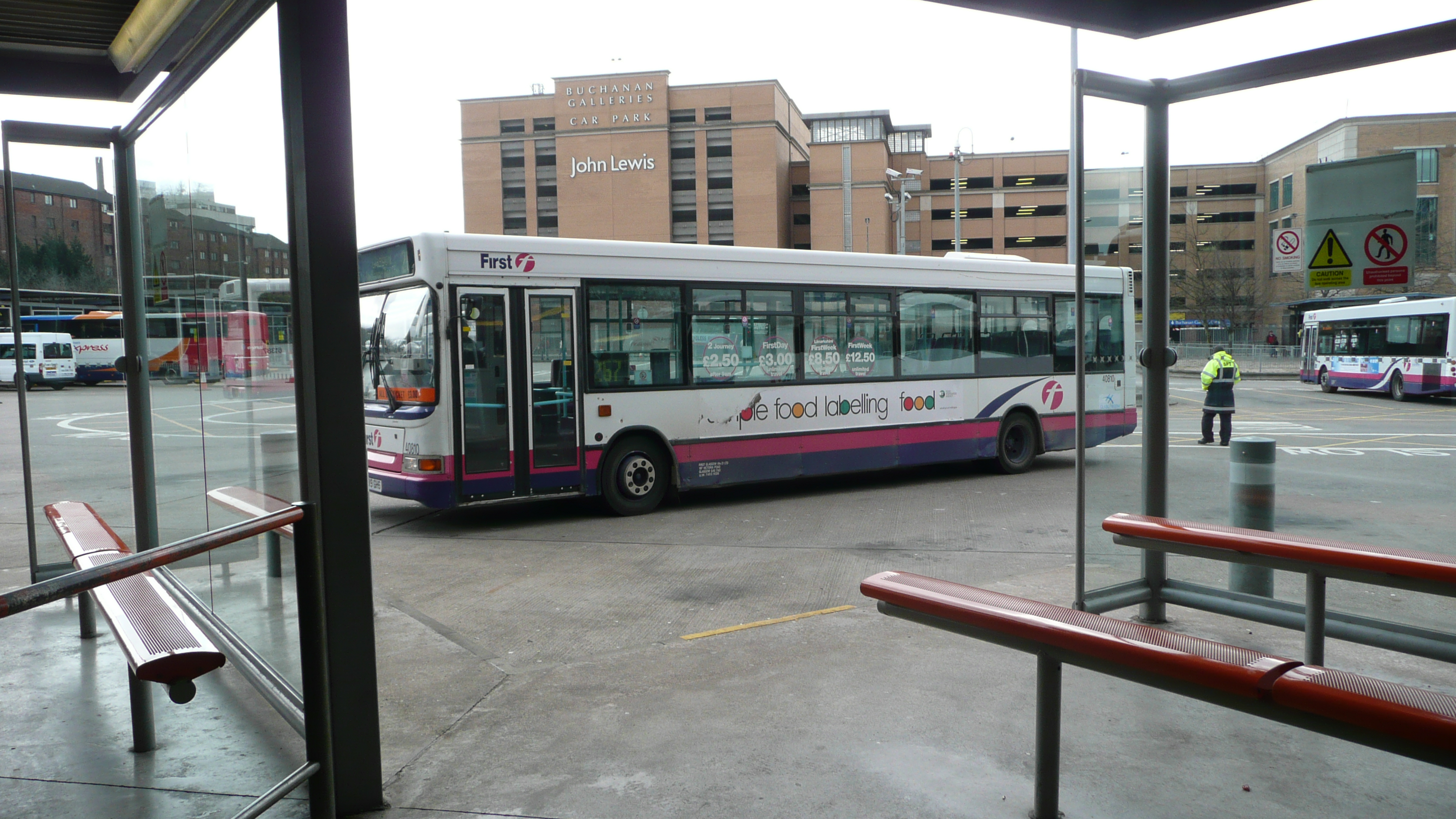
The saw-tooth arrangement used for the bus stands

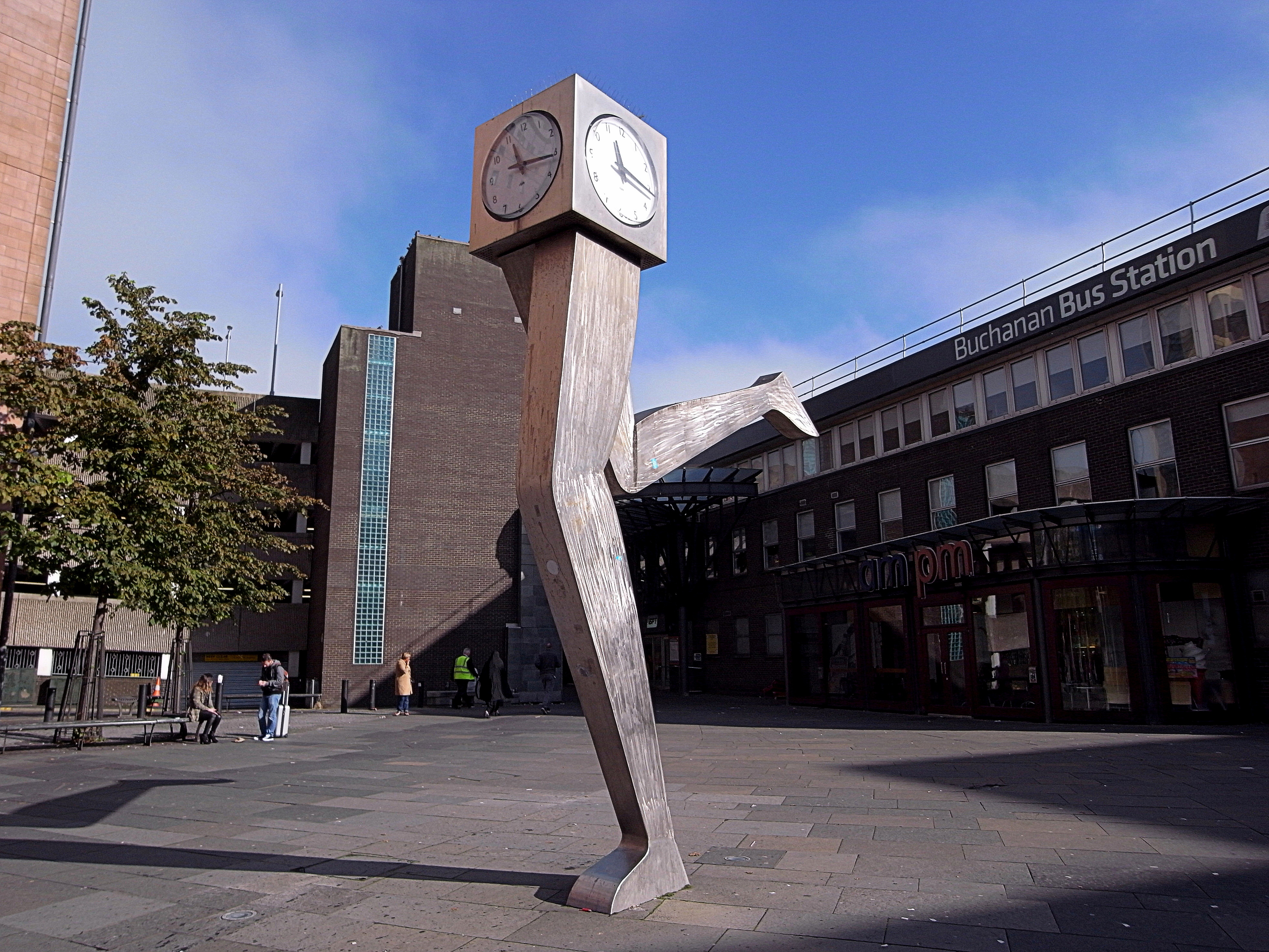
George Wyllie – The Clyde Clock outside the bus station

Buchanan bus station (originally Buchanan Street Bus Station) is the main bus terminus in Glasgow, Scotland, and is located between the Townhead and Cowcaddens districts on the north eastern side of the city centre. It is the terminus for journeys between the city and other towns and cities in Scotland, as well as long-distance services to other parts of the United Kingdom and some international journeys.

Around 1,700 bus journeys depart from the station every day, with over 40,000 passengers using these journeys on a daily basis. It is within walking distance of Glasgow Queen Street railway station and Cowcaddens and Buchanan Street subway stations. There is a railway station shuttle link, linking it with Glasgow Queen Street and Glasgow Central Station.

== History ==
The present Buchanan bus station opened in 1977. Prior to this date Scottish Bus Group services terminating on the north side of the city centre had used two smaller bus stations known as Killermont Street (also known as Buchanan Street) and Dundas Street Bus Stations, as well as on-street stances on adjacent streets. These facilities were very congested, although the situation was alleviated somewhat in the 1960s by the creation of overspill bus parking between the two stations following demolition of the block of buildings on the corner of Parliamentary Road and Killermont Street. That was only a temporary arrangement, as the demolition presaged the comprehensive redevelopment of this part of the city in the 1970s, sweeping away the original buildings and street layouts. As part of this redevelopment, the new Buchanan Bus Station was built to the east of the previous facilities, on land which had formerly been occupied by the north side of Parliamentary Road and part of the goods depot of the former Buchanan Street railway station, which had closed in the 1960s under the Beeching Axe. The new bus station was initially accessed to the south from the intersection of Parliamentary Road and North Hanover Street, but in the 1980s the former was realigned in an approximate east–west axis in order to create space for the Glasgow Royal Concert Hall (and the future Buchanan Galleries shopping mall), and was renamed as Killermont Street - the original street of that name having been the northern continuation of Dundas Street - but this was now built over by an adjoining multi-storey car park as part of the bus station development.

When it first opened Buchanan Street was the Glasgow terminus of all Alexander (Midland), Alexander (Fife), Alexander (Northern) and Highland Omnibuses services into the city, together with some Scottish Omnibuses and Central SMT routes. Long-distance coaches operated by Western SMT and National Express also used the station from the outset. The other SBG bus station in the city at that time was Anderston Bus Station which was used by all Western SMT local services and by the balance of Central SMT and Scottish Omnibuses routes. These arrangements perpetuated the longstanding situation whereby SBG services would terminate on the edge of the city centre rather than penetrating into it, requiring passengers who wished to cross the city centre to change to a Greater Glasgow PTE service. This protected the city operator's revenue and supposedly reduced congestion in the heart of the city, but it was not convenient for passengers and following deregulation some routes were altered to better serve the city centre. Most former Western SMT routes (by now operated by Western Scottish and Clydeside Scottish) switched from Anderston to Buchanan, while many SBG services to the city's peripheral housing estates were merged into cross-city routes that did not terminate in either bus station.

Following privatisation of the Scottish Bus Group in 1990–1991, ownership of the bus stations passed to Strathclyde Passenger Transport Executive in 1993, and then to its successors Strathclyde Passenger Transport Authority and Strathclyde Partnership for Transport in 1996 and 2006. By the early 1990s the competitive 'bus wars' which had broken out after deregulation had largely ended with most of the former SBG companies's suburban routes having been given up and left to Strathclyde Buses, whose services had never used the SBG bus stations. Anderston bus station closed in 1993, resulting in the transfer of some of its remaining services to Buchanan, whilst some other short-distance routes switched to on-street termini as a cost saving measure. Today Buchanan Street is the only bus station in the city, and it is predominantly used by longer-distance and express services.

== Operators ==
Services to Buchanan bus station are operated by:

- Ember
- First Glasgow (terminus of the 500 Glasgow Airport Express route)
- FlixBus
- Hannon Coaches
- JMB Travel
- John McGinley
- McColls Coaches
- McGill's Bus Services
- McGill's Scotland East
- National Express
- Orbis Transport
- Park's
- PVT Transfer
- Scottish Citylink (western terminus of the 900 Edinburgh–Glasgow route)
- Sindbad
- Stagecoach South Scotland
- Stuarts Coaches

== In popular culture ==
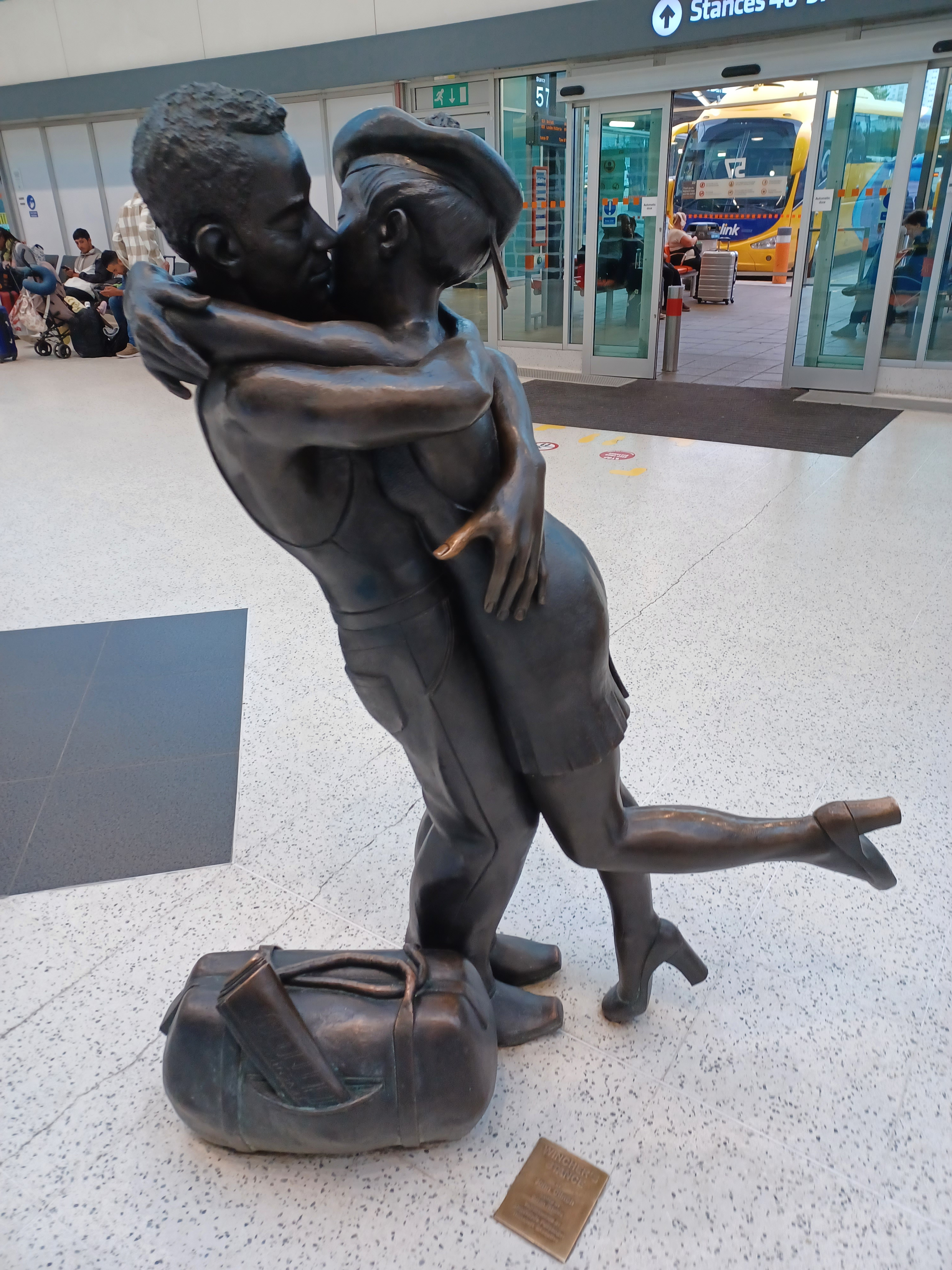
"Wincher's Stance", a statue by John Clinch, is in the bus station's waiting area. The work, which depicts a couple kissing, was commissioned by the Executive.

The station was romanticized by local musician Roddy Frame in the song Killermont Street, which appeared on his band Aztec Camera's 1987 album Love. The song deals with escapism to new places from the station, with the recurring line There's a message for us, we can get there by bus, from Killermont Street. Frame's official fansite is named "Killermont Street" in reference to the song.
