= Princes Square =

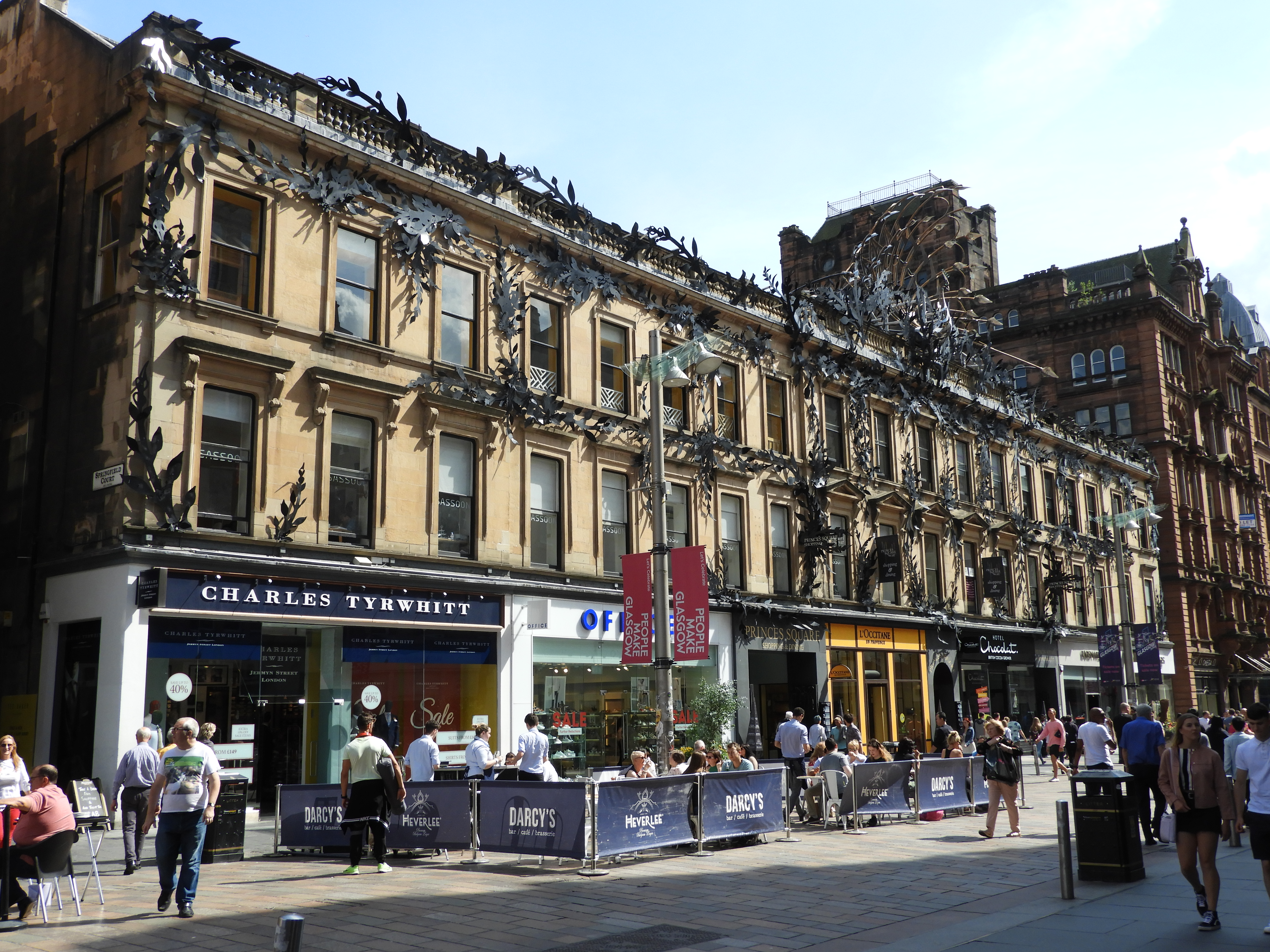
- Location: Glasgow, Scotland
- Coordinates: 55.85913°N 4.25368°W
- Opened: 1988
- Architect: Hugh Martin Partnership
- Website: princessquare.co.uk

Princes Square is a shopping centre on Buchanan Street in central Glasgow, Scotland. It was first designed and built in the 1840s by John Baird and other architects. It was developed in 1988 to a design by Edinburgh architects, the Hugh Martin Partnership. The new five-storey, 10,450-square-metre (112,500 sq ft) retail centre occupies a pre-existing cobbled Princes square dating from 1841, which was reconfigured by enclosing the entire space below a new clear glass domed and vaulted roof. An expansion was completed in summer 1999, extending the centre into Springfield Court and providing a further 1,860 square metres (20,000 sq ft) of retail area and a new retail frontage to Queen Street.

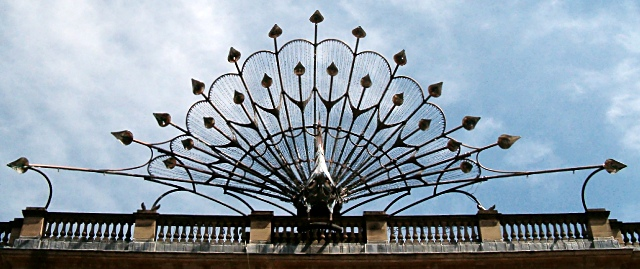
Peacock sculpture over the Buchanan Street facade of Princes Square

The original cellars of the existing buildings were excavated to provide additional space. Inside the square, new galleries and stairs give access to the upper storeys. The original sandstone facades were preserved around the modern interior. The centre is adorned with decorative glass, tiling, lighting, timber and metalwork, designed by artists and craftsmen.

The writer Bill Bryson referred to Princes Square as "one of the most intelligent pieces of urban renewal".

The Hugh Martin Partnership earned several design awards for Princes Square, including the RIBA Scottish Regional Award for Architecture (1988), the Edinburgh Architectural Association Centenary Medal (1989), and a Civic Trust Award (1989). In 2016, it was voted Scotland's best building of the last 100 years. The original fabric has been protected as a category B listed building since 1970.

In February 2024 the Princes Square Shopping Mall was sold for an undisclosed fee to property developers.
