= Statue of Donald Dewar =

Statue

Coordinates: 55.86401°N 4.25294°W

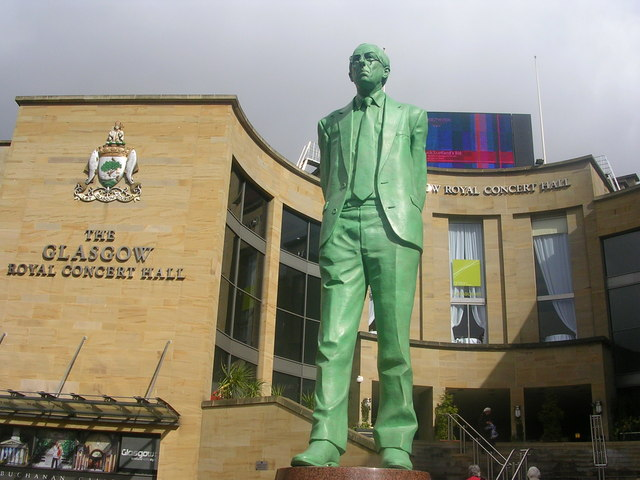
Statue of Donald Dewar

A statue of the Scottish politician Donald Dewar stands on Buchanan Street in Glasgow city centre. The statue was unveiled on 7 May 2002 by the prime minister of the United Kingdom, Tony Blair. It was sculpted by Kenny Mackay. The statue is 9 feet in height. Dewar is depicted wearing spectacles and his "characteristic stoop and crumpled suit".

The statue was unveiled on 7 May 2002 by the prime minister of the United Kingdom, Tony Blair in front of a crowd of several hundred people.

At the unveiling of the statue Blair said that Dewar's " ... compassion, his fundamental decency and his deep sense of social justice defined his entire approach as a politician" and described him as a "transforming moderate". The former leader of Scottish Labour, Wendy Alexander, said that the statue was " ... magnificent, the setting and the angle of it ...It's wonderful but it's not what he was when he was at his most exhausted".

The statue was taken down in October 2005 to be cleaned, and was re-erected on 6-foot (1.8 m) high plinth in December in an effort to protect it from vandalism.
