= Tenement House (Glasgow) =

Historic house museum in Glasgow, Scotland, UK

Coordinates: 55°52′05″N 4°16′06″W

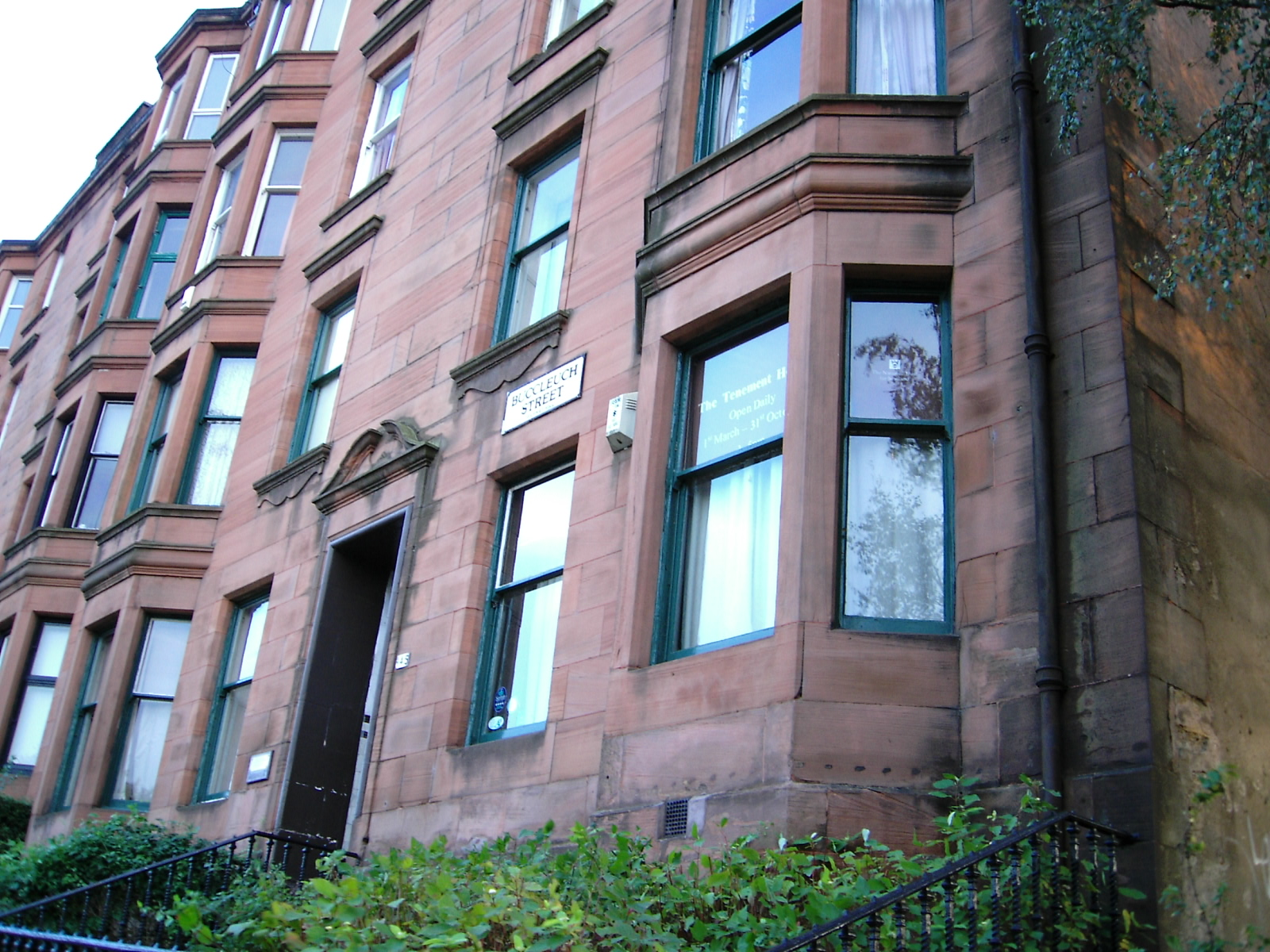
The Tenement House

The Tenement House is a historic house museum in Glasgow, owned and operated by the National Trust for Scotland.

It is located at 145 Buccleuch Street, in the Garnethill area, near Charing Cross railway station and Cowcaddens subway station. The property is a flat in an 1892 tenement building, preserved in its condition from the early 20th century. The flat was owned by Agnes Toward from 1911 until 1965; after her death it and its contents were acquired by the Trust, which opened it to the public. The museum received 23,456 visitors in 2019.

== Gallery ==
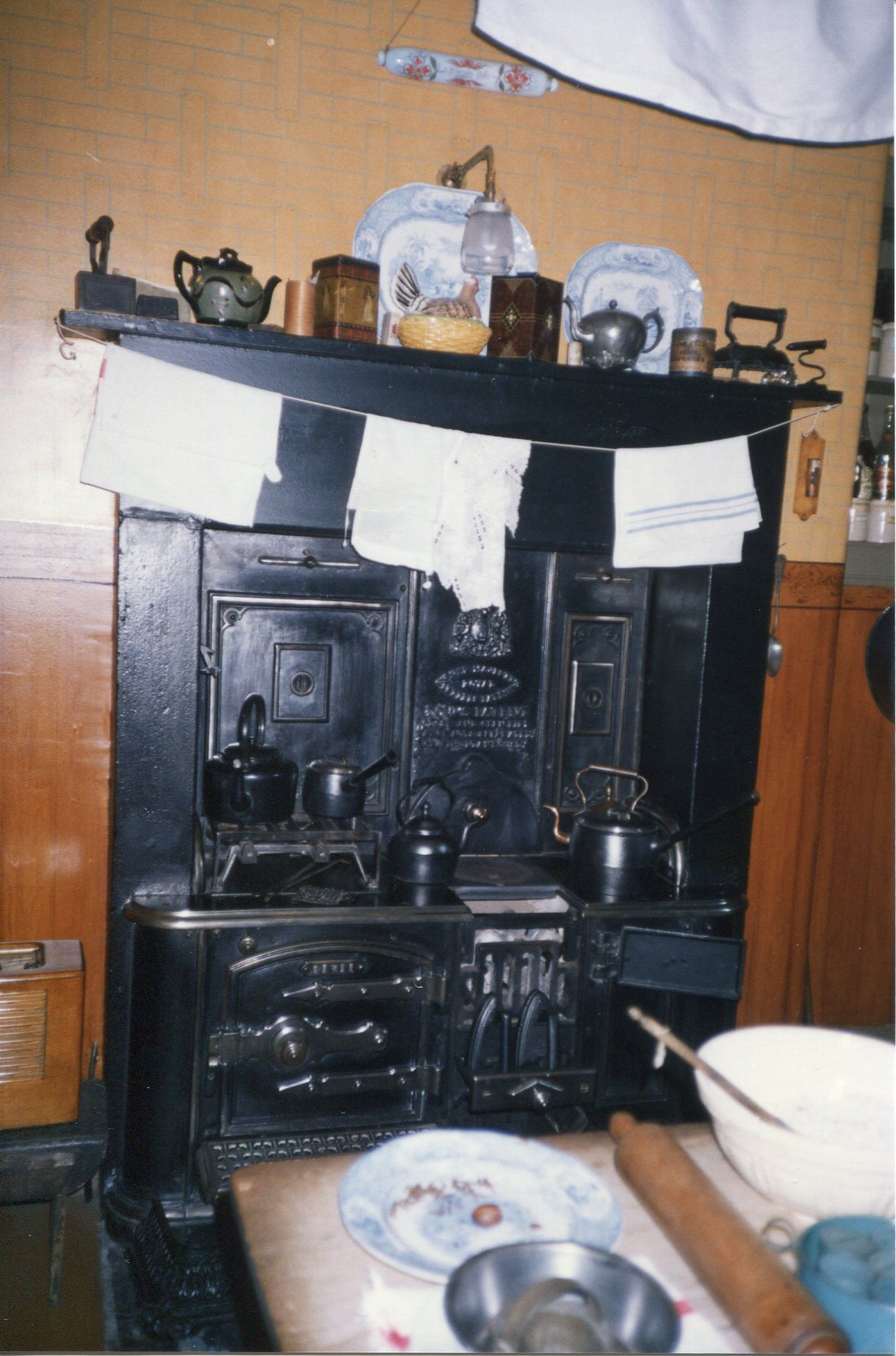

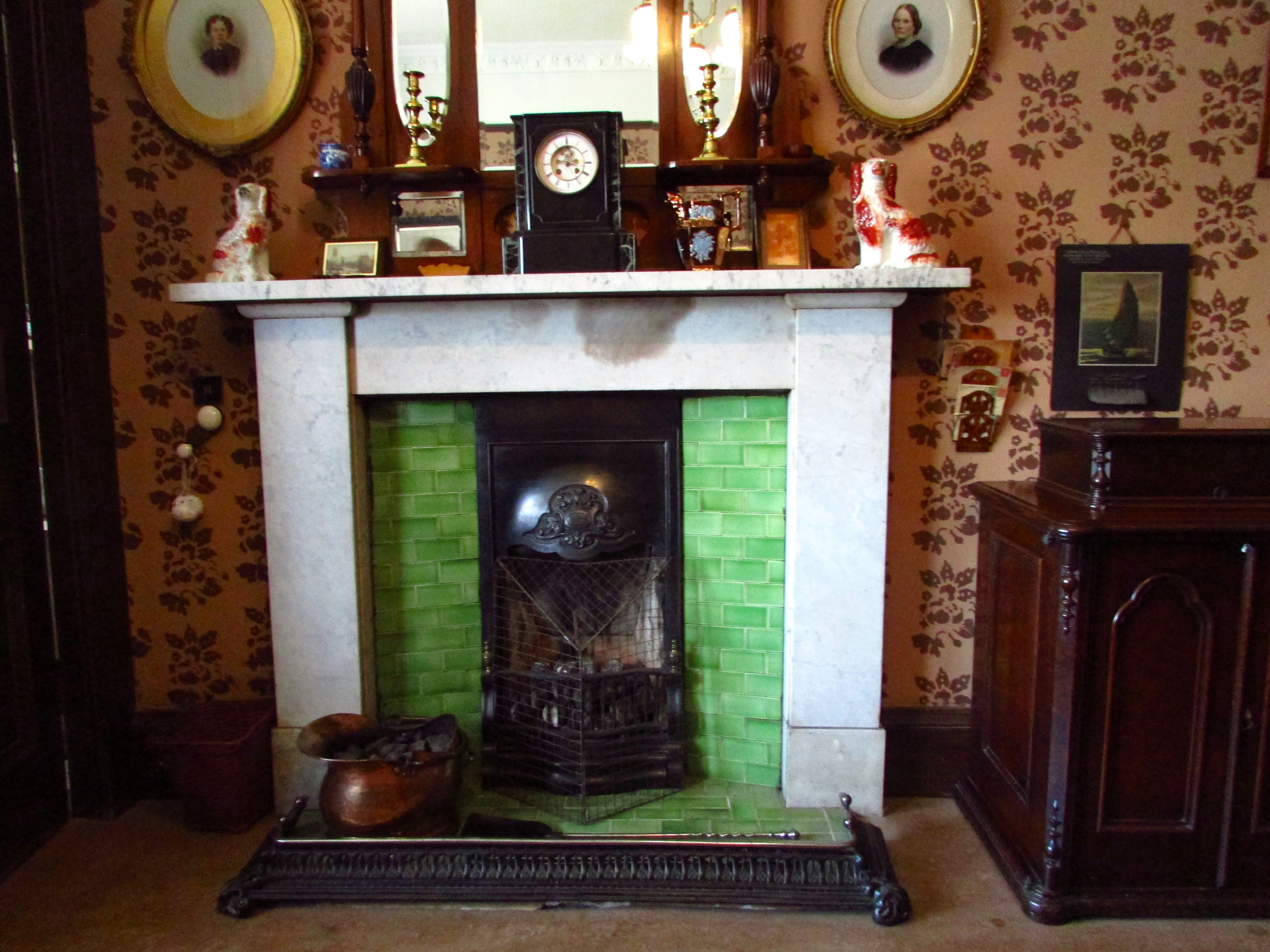

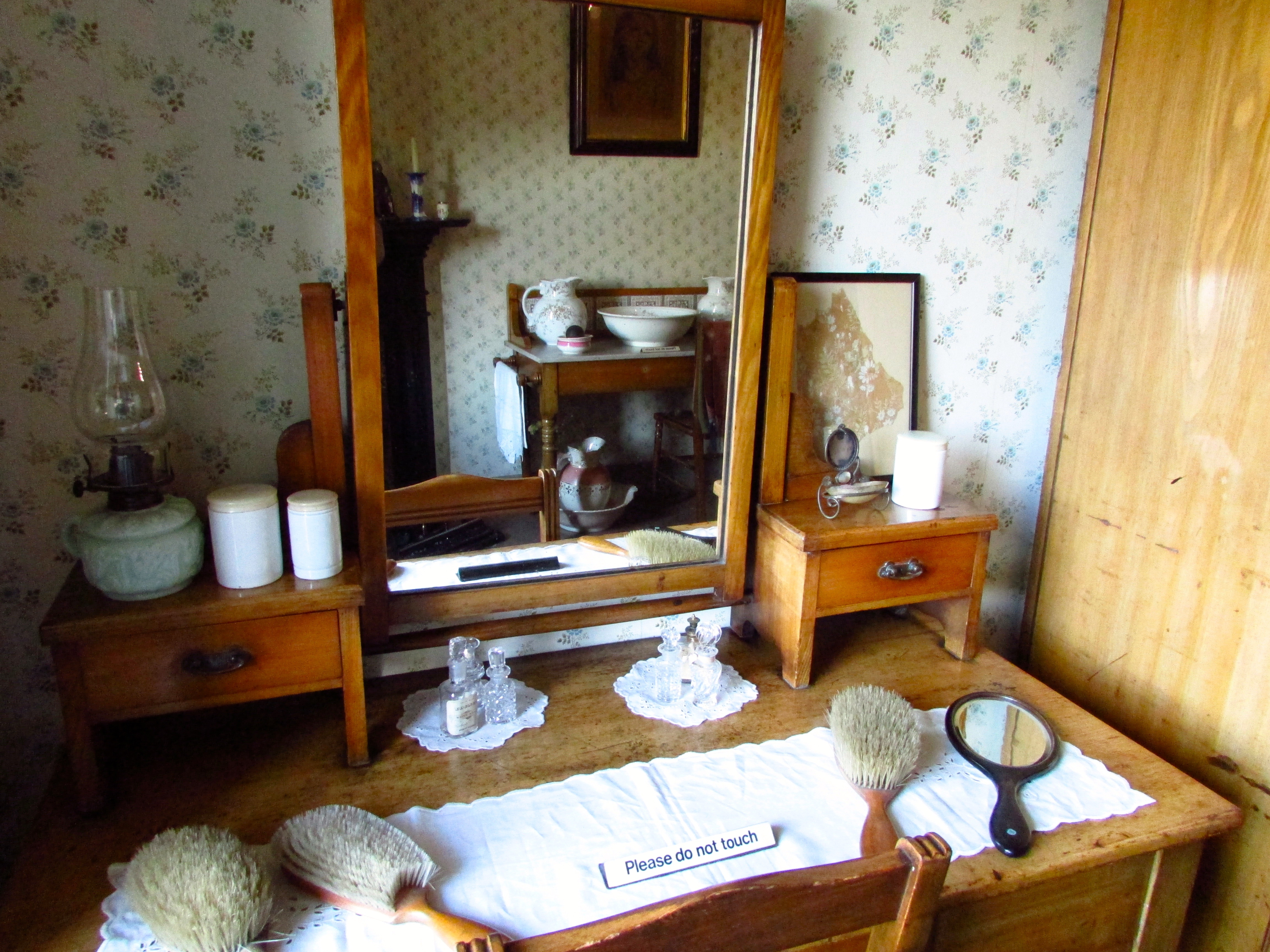

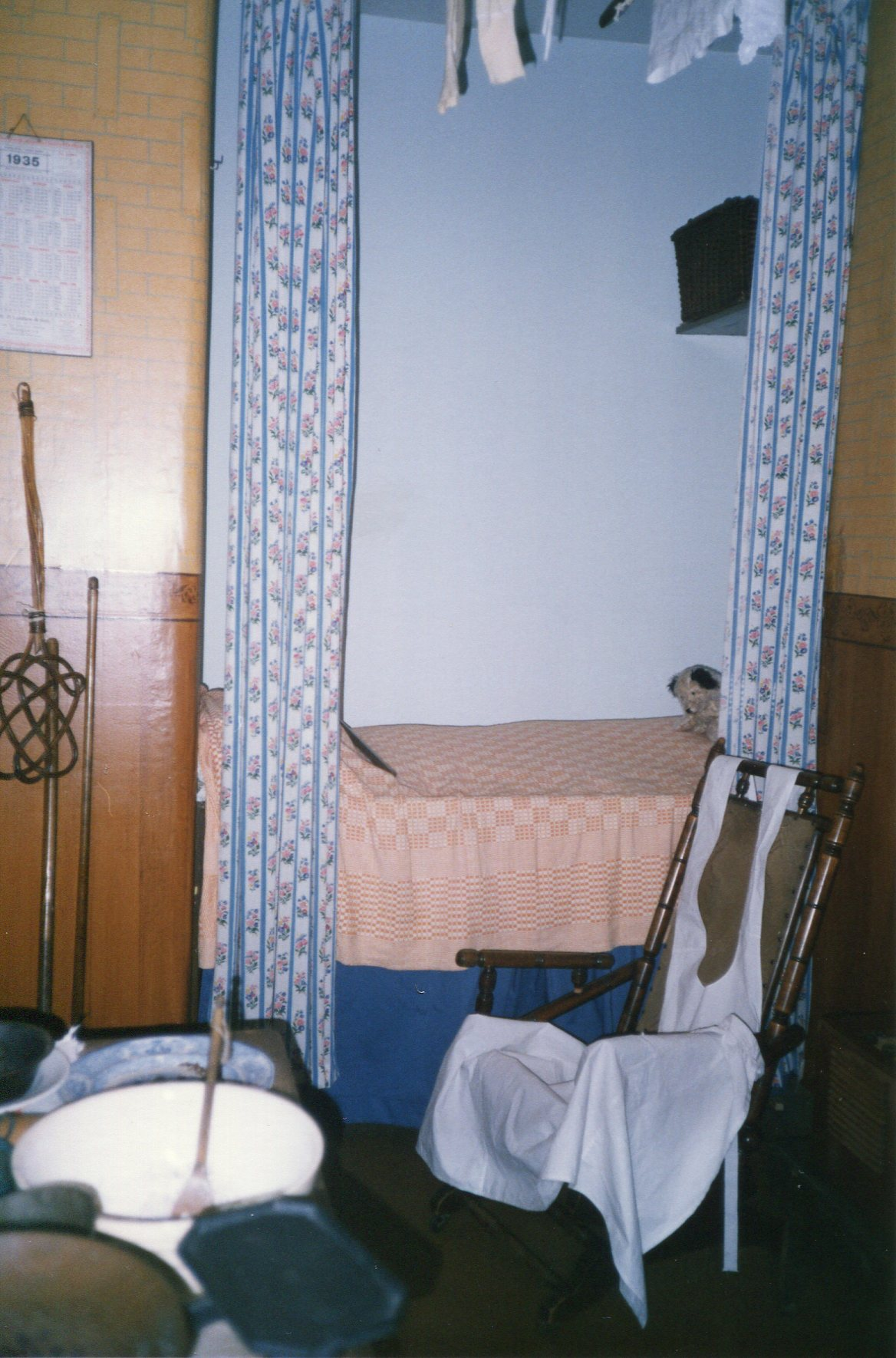

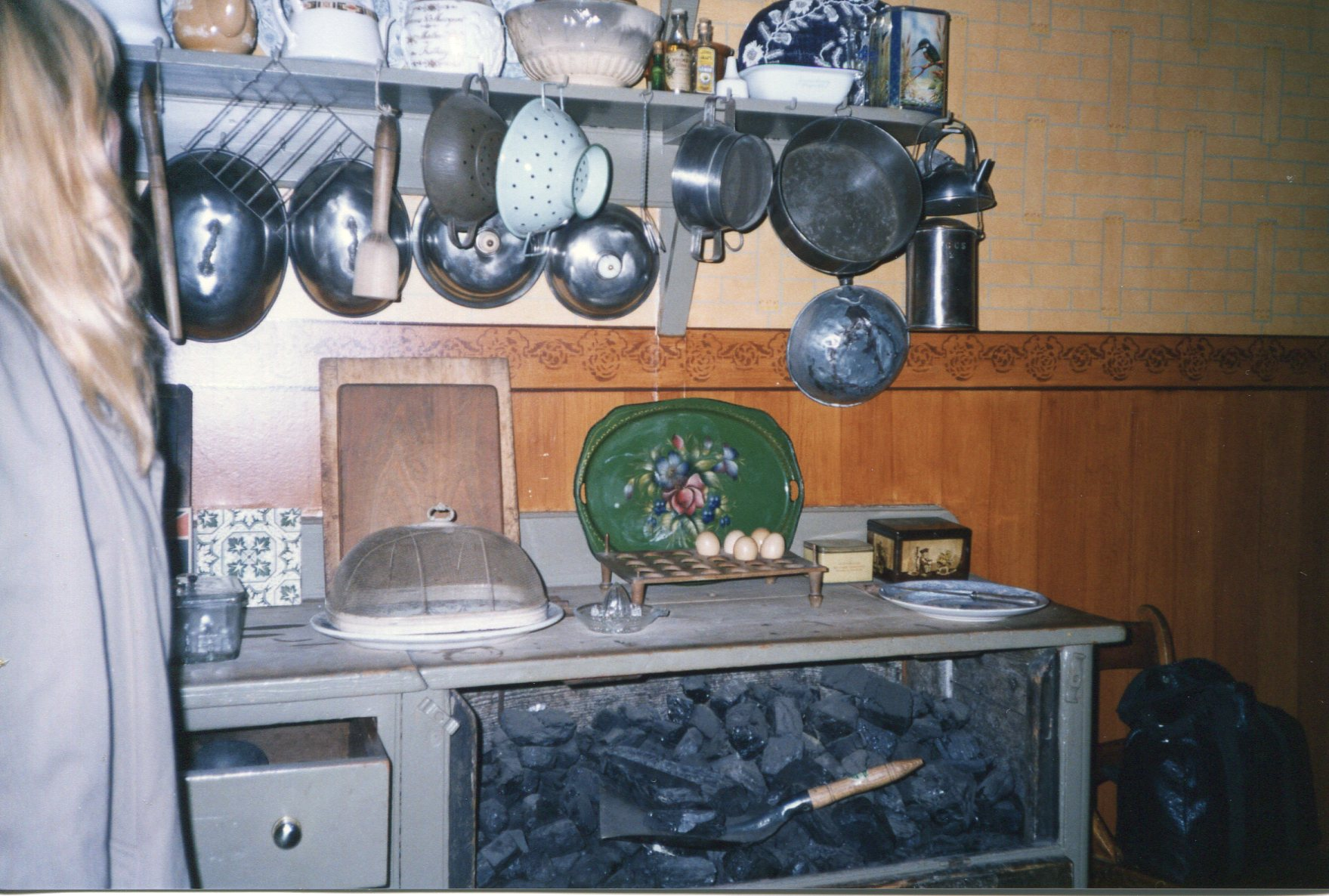

== See also ==
- Lower East Side Tenement Museum
