= Cowcaddens subway station =

Glasgow subway station

Cowcaddens
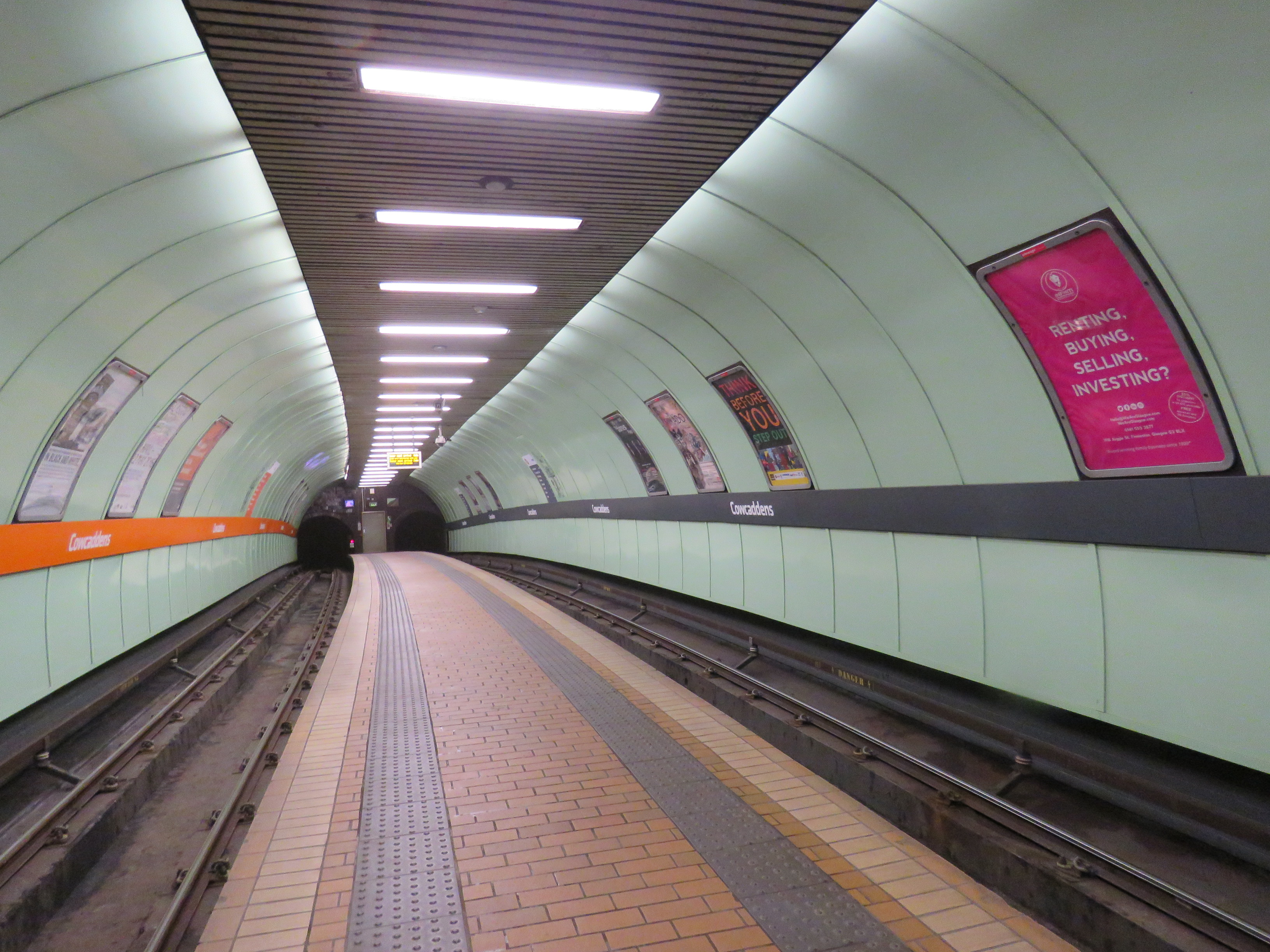

General information
- Location: 11 Dundasvale Court, Unit 1 Cowcaddens, Glasgow, G4 0SN; Scotland
- Coordinates: 55°52′06″N 4°15′33″W
- System: Scottish Gaelic: Cowcaddens
- Operator: SPT
- Transit authority: SPT
- Platforms: 2 (island platform)
- Tracks: 2

Construction
- Structure type: Underground
- Parking: No
- Cycle facilities: No
- Accessible: No

Other information
- Fare zone: 1

History
- Opened: 14 December 1896
- Rebuilt: 16 April 1980; 46 years ago

Passengers
- 2018: ▲0.451 million
- 2019: ▼0.427 million
- 2020: ▼0.170 million
- 2021: ▲0.195 million
- 2022: ▲0.373 million

Services
Preceding station	SPT	Following station
St George's Cross anticlockwise / inner circle	Glasgow Subway	Buchanan Street clockwise / outer circle
Location
Notes
- Passenger statistics provided are gate entries only. Information on gate exits for patronage is incomplete, and thus not included.

Cowcaddens subway station is a station on the Glasgow Subway and serves the Cowcaddens, Garnethill and Dundasvale areas of Glasgow, Scotland. It is located on the north side of the city centre. Glasgow School of Art, Tenement House, the National Piping Centre, and to some extent Glasgow Caledonian University are local institutions and attractions served by the station.

== History ==
It was opened in 1896 and was also marginally the closest Subway stop to the main line railway at Buchanan Street railway station which was closed in 1967. Like many of the original Subway stations, the surface entrance was part of the shop unit of a tenement building. After Cowcaddens was declared a Comprehensive Development Area (CDA) in the 1960s, mass demolition of tenement slums and other surrounding buildings took place, and by 1972 the station entrance was the only structure left standing in the area.

The station was rebuilt between 1977 and 1980, including the construction of a new surface-level ticket hall and the addition of escalators. Nevertheless, the station retained its original island platform configuration.

Nearby places:

- Garnethill
- Glasgow Kelvin College
- Royal Conservatoire of Scotland
- St. Aloysius’ College
- Chinatown

There are 500,000 boardings a year at this station.

== Past passenger numbers ==
- 2011/12: 0.459 million annually
