= St Rollox railway station =

Disused railway station in Glasgow, Scotland

St Rollox

General information
- Location: Glasgow, Lanarkshire; Scotland
- Platforms: 2

Other information
- Status: Disused

History
- Original company: Garnkirk and Glasgow Railway
- Pre-grouping: Caledonian Railway
- Post-grouping: London, Midland and Scottish Railway

Key dates
- 1 June 1831: Opened
- 1 November 1849: Closed
- 1 August 1883: Reopened
- 5 November 1962: Closed

St Rollox railway station served the city of Glasgow, historically in Lanarkshire, Scotland, from 1831 to 1962 on the Glasgow and Garnkirk Railway.

== History ==
=== First site ===
Coordinates:55.8697°N 4.2415°W
The first site of the station was opened on 1 June 1831 by the Garnkirk and Glasgow Railway. It was also known as Glasgow (Townhead) and Glebe Street. It closed on 1 November 1849, being replaced by Buchanan Street.

=== Second site ===
Coordinates:55.874°N 4.2324°W
The second station was opened on 1 August 1883 by the Caledonian Railway. A temporary platform was used earlier for collection of tickets. The station closed on 5 November 1962.
