= Parliamentary Road =

Former street in Glasgow, Scotland

Coordinates: 55.86516°N 4.24651°W

The location of Parliamentary Road on a modern map of Glasgow

Parliamentary Road was a major street in the Townhead area of the city of Glasgow, Scotland, and was originally the district's main thoroughfare. Most of the street was removed by the late 1980s as part of successive regeneration schemes in Townhead and neighbouring Cowcaddens, and as such almost none of the street remains evident to the present day.

The road was the original north eastern continuation of Sauchiehall Street, crossing the railway tracks of Queen Street Station and on into the Townhead area – thus forming one of the main arteries from the city centre to the East End. It was originally constructed at a cost of £6,000 and was a toll road until 1865.

The Glasgow Lunatic Asylum was located on Parliamentary Road between 1814 and 1843, when it moved to new premises at Gartnavel Royal Hospital.

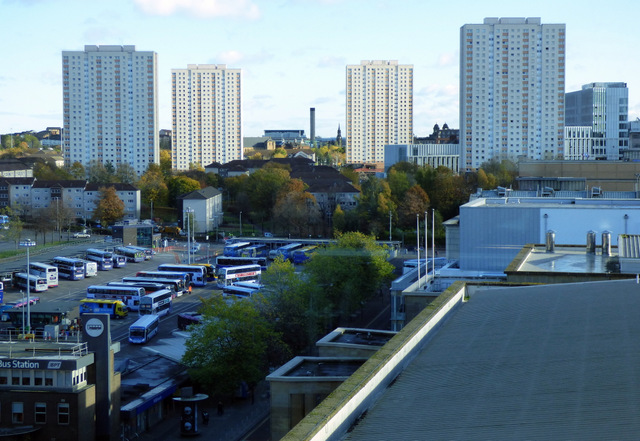
The route of Parliamentary Road looking north east from the roof of Glasgow Royal Concert Hall, with Buchanan Bus Station in the foreground – originally the road ran towards the four tower blocks onto the chimney (of Glasgow Royal Infirmary) in the far distance, where it terminated with Castle Street

In the mid-1950s, Townhead was declared a Comprehensive Development Area (CDA) by Glasgow Corporation, which advocated depopulation of the area and its rezoning for educational and industrial use, with a much lower housing density than before. The slum clearances and the subsequent construction of the Townhead B housing estate in the 1960s, and later; the construction of Buchanan Street Bus Station in the late 1970s saw a complete rearrangement of the roads in the area which saw both Parliamentary Road and much of the surrounding street plan wiped out completely. The western section of the road was realigned in an approximate east–west axis between North Hanover Street and West Nile Street and was renamed as Killermont Street (the original Killermont Street having been a continuation of Dundas Street, running roughly north–south). A path running north easterly through the housing estate follows the approximate line of the route, which now forms part of St Mungo Avenue. Some of the footpaths and housing blocks bear the names of many of the surrounding streets that were removed by the slum clearances.

The final remains of Parliamentary Road were removed in the 1990s when the construction of the Glasgow Royal Concert Hall and the Buchanan Galleries shopping mall over the western end of the road took place, and an eastern stub disappeared under a five-a-side football complex.

In 2023 Glasgow City Council, states in its new Regeneration Framework, a desire to create a new "Parliamentary Path" along the alignment for walking and cycling, together with other initiatives to better connect the residential area of Townhead with the city centre
