= Chinatown, Glasgow =

Coordinates: 55.8690474°N 4.2617705°W

Chinatown
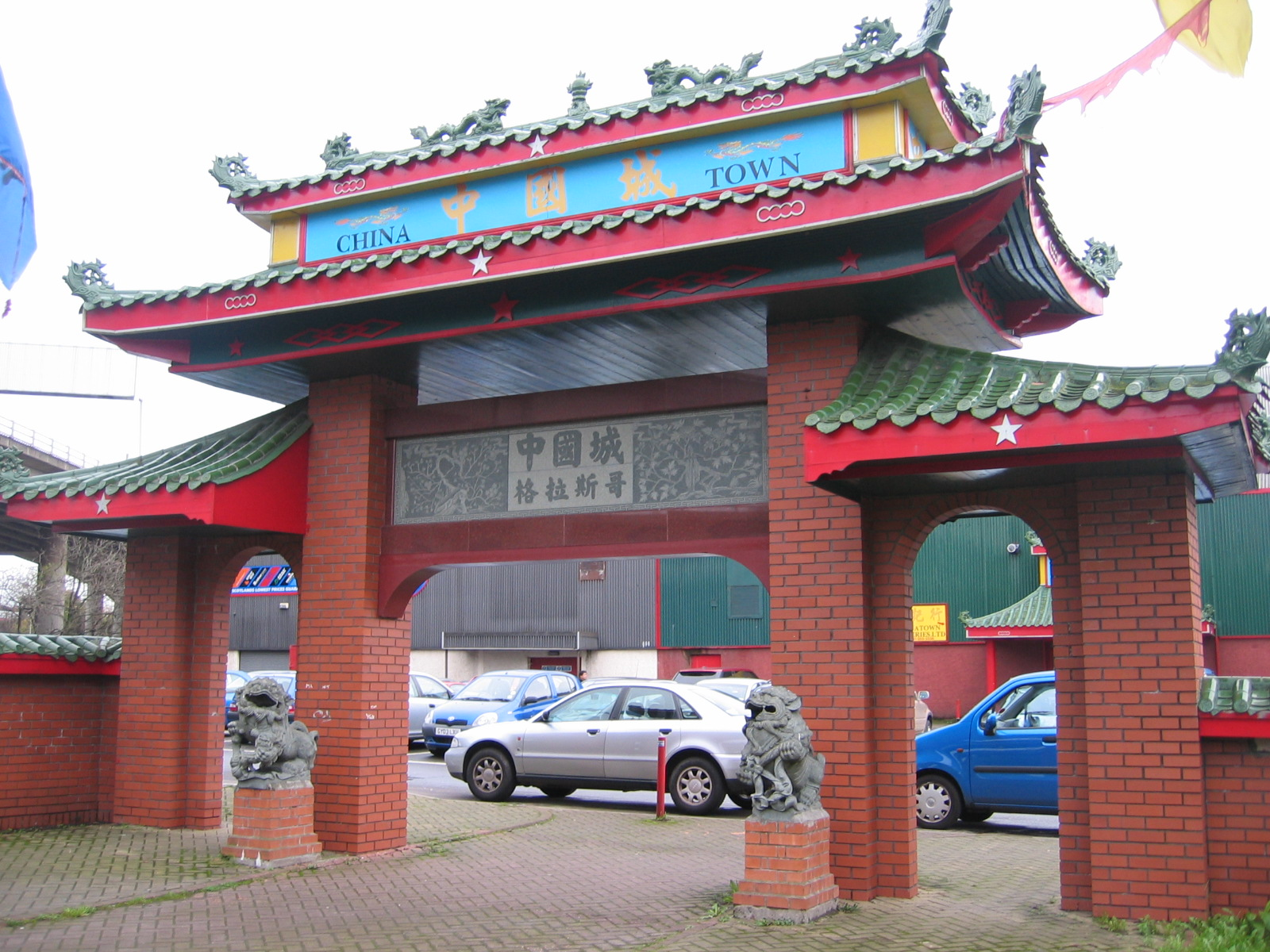
- Metropolitan borough: Glasgow
- Country: Scotland
- Sovereign state: United Kingdom
- Post town: Glasgow
- Police: Scotland
- Fire: Scottish
- Ambulance: Scottish

Chinatown in Glasgow, Scotland is a Chinese shopping complex that opened in 1992 in Cowcaddens.

== History ==
The first Chinese who came to Glasgow were seamen in the late nineteenth century. Some of these Chinese seamen were involved in the Red Clydeside harbour riots in 1919. The first Chinese restaurants in Glasgow, Wah Yen, was opened in 1948 by Jimmy Yin on Govan Road. However, at the time, few Chinese lived in the city.

As more Chinese migrants moved to the city in the 1980s and 1970s, many settled in Garnethill and Woodlands, accounting for 66.4 per cent of the Chinese population in Glasgow in 1989. In nearby Cowcaddens, plans were set to convert an old warehouse into a Chinese shopping complex. The £600,000 project, financed by Chung Ying Investments, resulted in a Chinese mall with 15 shopping units and a large restaurant known as Chinatown, which opened its doors in 1992. The entrance to Chinatown is made in the style of a traditional Chinese gateway with materials imported from Asia.

In 2017, the Chinatown restaurant shut its doors after 25 years of business. In 2026, a large redevelopment scheme was announced for Chinatown.
