= Townhead =

District of Glasgow, Scotland

Coordinates: 55.864836°N 4.246655°W

Townhead: Scottish Gaelic: Ceann a' Bhaile; Scots: Tounheid
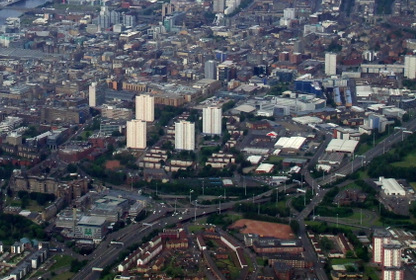
- Aerial image looking east over Townhead area (2012)

- Location within Glasgow
- OS grid reference: NS595658
- Council area: Glasgow City Council
- Lieutenancy area: Glasgow
- Country: Scotland
- Sovereign state: United Kingdom
- Post town: GLASGOW
- Postcode district: G1
- Dialling code: 0141
- Police: Scotland
- Fire: Scottish
- Ambulance: Scottish
- UK Parliament: Glasgow Central
- Scottish Parliament: Glasgow Kelvin

Townhead (Scottish Gaelic: Ceann a' Bhaile, Scots: Tounheid) is a district within the city of Glasgow, Scotland. It is one of Glasgow's oldest areas, and contains two of its major surviving medieval landmarks – Glasgow Cathedral and the Provand's Lordship.

In medieval times, Townhead was the gateway into Glasgow from the north, while today it forms the north eastern extremity of the city centre. Townhead experienced great change between the mid 1950s and late 1970s following the publication of the infamous Bruce Report, when it was substantially depopulated and redeveloped. Today, it contains a much reduced resident population, a commercial/industrial sector and an educational quarter centred around the campuses of both the University of Strathclyde and City of Glasgow College.

== Location ==
In ancient times, Townhead was an undeveloped area situated north of the cathedral and town with no definitive boundaries. Today, it is bordered to the west by Cowcaddens, to the north by Sighthill, to the east by Royston and Ladywell/Dennistoun and to the south by the Merchant City. The notional boundaries of Townhead are thus North Hanover Street and Dobbie's Loan to the west, the M8 motorway to the north, Castle Street and High Street to the east and George Street to the south.

== Housing ==
Housing is primarily ex-council stock (Glasgow has no council houses since their transfer to the Glasgow Housing Association), although the area contains a large number of student residences for International Christian College, Glasgow Caledonian University and Strathclyde University. Most of the housing units are fairly modern 8 in a block flats, although its most visually obvious features are the four 24-storey high-rise flats named "2 Taylor Place", "15 Grafton Place", "7 St Mungo's Place" and "12 Dobbies Loan Place".

== History ==
=== Early history 15th–20th century ===
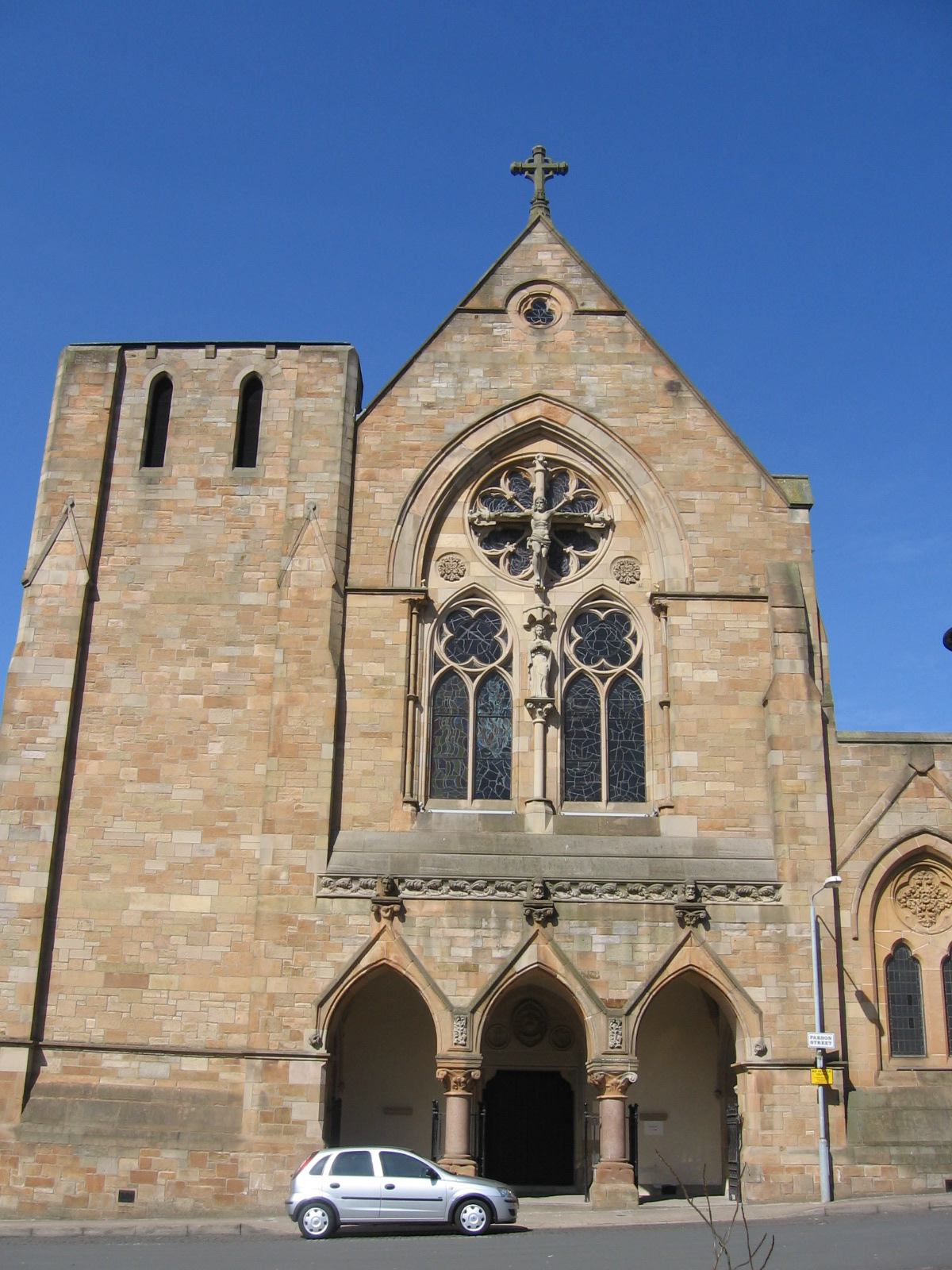
Church of St Mungo, Townhead

It is widely accepted that near the eastern edge of modern day Townhead, is where St Kentigern, also known as St Mungo, built his church by the banks of the Molendinar Burn and thus established Glasgow. Glasgow Cathedral, dedicated to St Mungo, is roughly situated where Mungo's original church once stood. The present building dates back to the 12th century. Today, the Cathedral sits immediately outside of Townhead's boundaries and falls into the Ladywell area.

Provand's Lordship, Glasgow's oldest remaining house, was constructed from the late 15th century by Bishop Andrew, later given the surname Muirhead as part of St Nicholas Hospital, a lodging for the poor. The hospital, or more accurately hospitium, provided accommodation and care for twelve poor men who contributed through work in the hospital, Bible study and growing produce in the gardens. The gardens were restored in 1997 and, like the original St Nicolas garden, the herbs grown are those known for healing properties and medicinal use.

The martyrdom of the Covenanters took place in the modern area called Townhead. The northern part of Castle Street was the town limits beyond which was called the "Howgait". Howgait was the scene of public hangings and used until 1781, when they moved to Glasgow Green. The area is now mainly taken up by Junction 15 of the M8.

The former Martyrs' Church building (moved to its current location in 1975 and then closed by members vote in 2011) contained until September 2013 the Martyrs stone, which details the executions in 1684 of James Nisbet (a farmer from Louden Parish in Ayrshire), James Lawson and Alex Wood. The stone, which originally stood in front of Townhead library, along with a large part of the once densely packed Townhead, was demolished to make way for the M8 motorway. The stone can now be found in the church wall of "The Evangelical Church" which is at the South East side of Cathedral square. Martyrs church also contained the "Martyrs church bell", which was preserved from the old Martyrs West church building until 2013 at which point, finding no new home, the bell was melted. The church of Scotland is currently seeking a buyer for the land which has planning permission for an extensive housing development and community building.

The Church of Scotland still supporting Townhead through the parish ministry of Glasgow Cathedral and by giving temporary accommodation to SIMY Community Development charity which was formally an active part of the previous church's parish care. Since closure, SIMY has become an independent, local volunteer lead charity providing youth work support, arts provision, sports coaching, life skills, outdoor education, drop in diversionary clubs and is a DofE centre. SiMY owes its survival to the support it receives from the Church, Iona Community, Townhead community council, AplusM training, Glasgow Housing Association, Glasgow Community Safety Services, Glasgow Life and a dedicated group of volunteers many of whom have grown up in the local area or work nearby.

St Mungo's Church, Parson Street (George Goldie, 1869) is Italiante-Gothic in style. 70 Parson Street is the birthplace of architect Charles Rennie MacIntosh, who also aided in the design of Martyr's School, at 17 Parson Street.

=== Mid 20th century–present ===
In line with post-war gentrification going on in Glasgow at the time, and in line with recommendations from the Bruce Report, and the wider trend towards slum clearance the mid 1950s onward saw great change in Townhead. Like Anderston and the Gorbals, Townhead was designated a Comprehensive Development Area (CDA), which meant that huge swathes of tenement housing was demolished and its population rehomed. Townhead's original main thoroughfare – Parliamentary Road, was destroyed along with large portions of the original street plan, upon which new housing estates – a mixture of lower density maisonette blocks and four 24-storey tower blocks replaced the old tenement housing. While some Townhead residents were rehomed in the new buildings, others were moved to new estates on the outer fringes of the city. As a result, almost none of the tenements in Townhead have survived, although some of the original street names live on in the names of the tower blocks and footpaths. North of Parliamentary Road, the cleared area was devoted to a new industrial zone, which stretched towards Baird Street with the new Glasgow Inner Ring Road acting as its boundary, and comprised mainly new industrial units. The controversial eastern flank of the ring road, which would have swung southwards along the route of Castle Street and necessitated the demolition and rebuilding of Glasgow Royal Infirmary, was abandoned and the original Victorian hospital was given an indefinite stay of execution (although the hospital was substantially expanded in the late 1970s). The artist Joan Eardley captured much of this redevelopment from her studio in Townhead.

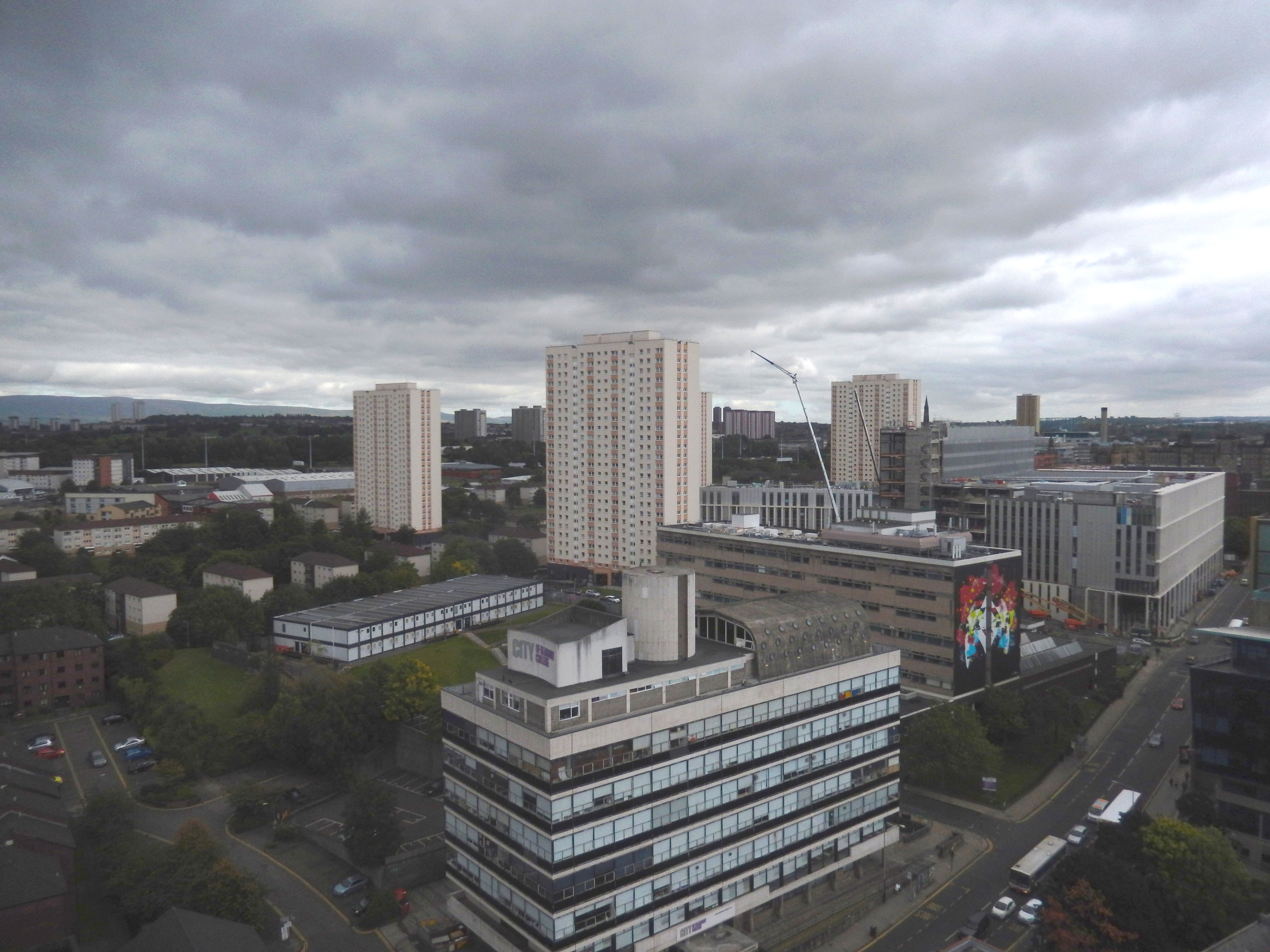
Townhead looking north east (from the roof of the Met Tower), showing part of the educational zone with the buildings of City of Glasgow College, and the tower blocks of the Townhead 'B' housing estate, built in 1967

The southern reaches of Townhead between Parliamentary Road and George Street were cleared to make way for a new educational zone, which would see several new colleges constructed such as the Central College of Commerce, Glasgow College of Food Technology and Stow College of Building. The centerpiece of this area would be the new University of Strathclyde, created out of the former Royal College of Science and Technology. Here can be found the most famous and oldest of Townhead's streets – Rottenrow. It was from this high vantage point at the top of Balmanno Brae that St. Mungo could see, south, down to the River Clyde and be forewarned of the approach of any hostile people. Rottenrow was also home to the Glasgow Royal Maternity Hospital. This hospital was demolished in 2001, and replaced by a garden.

In 1972, agreement was reached between the publishing company William Collins, Sons and the University of Strathclyde for the latter to acquire its printing works located at the eastern end of Cathedral Street which was once one of the biggest industrial complexes in Townhead. The land and buildings were turned over for academic use – a notable example being the giant warehouse building at the junction of Cathedral Street and St James's Road being converted to a new home for the Andersonian Library in 1980.

The New Barony Church was acquired by the University of Strathclyde in 1986, restored in 1989, and is now a ceremonial hall and events venue known as the Barony Hall.

The 2010s saw the creation of the new City of Glasgow College, which was formed from an earlier amalgamation of several further education colleges in the city (Glasgow Metropolitan College). A new "supercampus" was built on the former site of Allan Glen's College on Cathedral Street, and opened in 2014. The University of Strathclyde built a new sports centre adjacent the same year.

== Artistic connections ==
Charles Rennie Mackintosh was born in Townhead on 7 June 1868.

The artist Joan Eardley spent the years 1950–1957 living and working in Townhead and was especially interested in portraying its children.

== Recent developments ==
Townhead has a community council of local volunteers. Recently Townhead was merged for community council purposes with the neighbouring Ladywell area of Glasgow. This resulted in the formation of Townhead and Ladywell Community Council. The community council members were instrumental in obtaining the funding for a village hall in Townhead, which opened in 2013. They were less successful in obtaining planning concessions in relation to a massive campus development being built in Townhead by City of Glasgow College. Although this area of Townhead had long been zoned for educational use as far back as the 1950s, the community council had expressed concerns about the proximity of the development to residential property, and argued for special planning conditions to be included given the potential for disruption to local people. Townhead has witnessed an abnormally high number of applications to convert standard homes into Houses of Multiple occupation (bedsits). The local community council has been at the forefront of articulating the local community's concerns in this regard.

The recent sell off of the Glasgow Cathedral, Martyrs church building Removed a key community meeting space from the community and is due to add more student housing to the area.

SIMY Community Development, a large local volunteer-run youth and community charity, are backed by the community council in efforts to develop new youth work for young people in Townhead by transporting to other areas as Townhead no longer as any indoor sports areas. The demolition of the Martyrs church will be the third large community building removed from the area since 2012 which saw the closure of St David School and The Hurdy Gurdy. It will also remove the only indoor sports courts still available to the public and community groups in the G4 / South G21 area.

SiMY's silver DofE groups were working to improve the environment around the form Martyrs church building aesthetically as well as making it a useful place for them once the building is demolished. They were unsuccessful in their submitted plan for "stalled spaces" project as the General trustees of the church of Scotland were concerns that any work could hamper sale of the land. The DofE's group plans were supported by the "Townhead and Ladywell Community Council" and so are seeking advice from Glasgow Planning about possibilities.

The Martyrs stone was moved on 12 September 2013 to the Glasgow Evangelical Church in Cathedral square by Glasgow City Council at the request of the Glasgow Evangelical Church and the Scottish Covenanter Memorials Association to Cathedral Square, a historical centre of Glasgow, where it can be seen by Glaswegians and tourists.

The Townhead Village Hall opened in 2013 and provides for social activities and services for the Townhead community. The building and the land on which it has been built is owned by a community led company. With the recent changes preventing school lets in St Mungos School, the Village Hall is now the only facilities with space for community activities and functions. The hall is in use every day and evening providing vital services to the local community and private function space Thursday – Sunday. In Nov 2013 the village hall opened their Townhead Orchard providing a green space for local residence to enjoy gardening and tree maintenance under the supervision of centre staff during opening hours. The garden is protected by a high fence and security cameras.

In 2013, Townhead's status as the city's largest educational zone was expanded with planning applications being received for increased student accommodation to match the new large college campus for the area. This is part of the council's 2013–2018 development strategy for the area

== Transport links ==
Townhead is also well situated for transport links with Glasgow Queen Street Station and Buchanan bus station on its doorstep.

== See also ==
- Glasgow tower blocks
- List of tallest buildings and structures in Glasgow
