= Cowcaddens =

Area of Glasgow, Scotland

Coordinates: 55.868194°N 4.259635°W

Cowcaddens: Scottish Gaelic: Cua Calltainn; Scots: Coucaddens
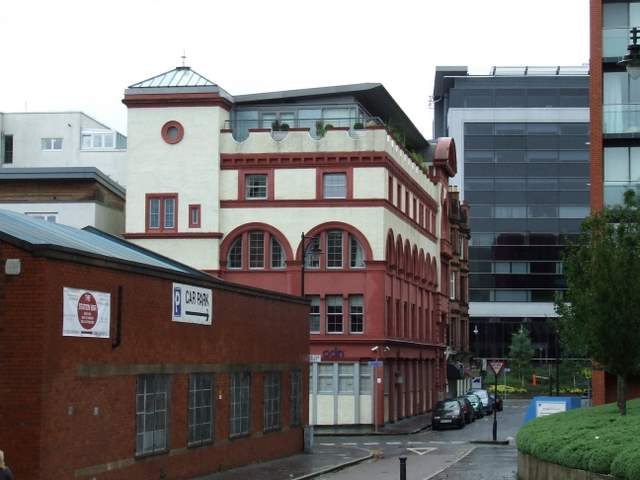
- McPhater Street

- Location within Glasgow
- OS grid reference: NS587662
- Council area: Glasgow City Council
- Lieutenancy area: Glasgow
- Country: Scotland
- Sovereign state: United Kingdom
- Post town: GLASGOW
- Postcode district: G4
- Dialling code: 0141
- Police: Scotland
- Fire: Scottish
- Ambulance: Scottish
- UK Parliament: Glasgow Central
- Scottish Parliament: Glasgow Kelvin

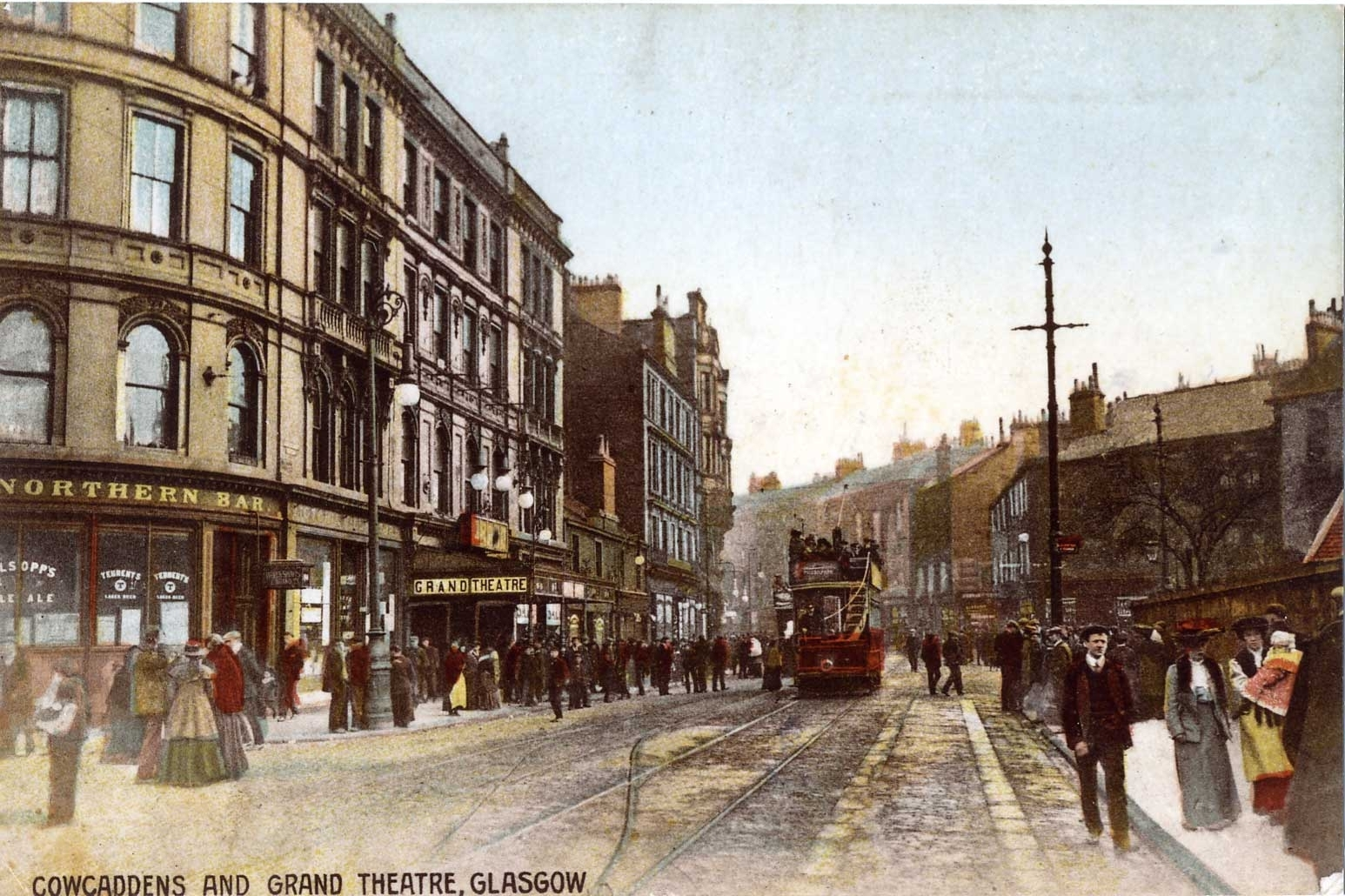
Glasgow's Cowcaddens Cross viewing east towards Hope Street in postcard c1900

Cowcaddens (/ˌkaʊˈkædənz/; Scots: Coucaddens, Scottish Gaelic: Cua Calltainn) is an area of the city of Glasgow, Scotland. It sits on the northern fringe of the city centre and is bordered by the newer area of Garnethill to the south-west and Townhead to the east.

== History ==
Cowcaddens was originally a village and became an industrious and thriving part of the expanding Glasgow, being close to Port Dundas and the Forth and Clyde Canal immediately to its north. Its boundaries merged into the City of Glasgow in 1846. By the 1880s, the area was becoming a slum district with the highest level of infant mortality (190 per thousand births) in the city, a figure which was three times that of the West End. Like neighbouring Townhead, Cowcaddens was one of many areas in Glasgow declared a Comprehensive Development Area (CDA) by Glasgow Corporation which led to the mass demolition of the tenement slums, and their replacement with a mixture of lower density housing, commercial and educational zones. The construction of the Glasgow Inner Ring Road in the late 1960s brought huge changes to the northern part of Cowcaddens with major realignment of roads and throughfares.

Cowcaddens is served by Cowcaddens subway station on the Glasgow Subway system, and by bus services through it and emanating from Buchanan Bus Station. Glasgow Caledonian University is nearby.

The eastern part of Cowcaddens forms part of the city's 'learning quarter' with neighbouring Townhead. In 1971 the new Glasgow College of Technology (GCT) was founded (in response to the city's previous higher education college – the Royal College of Science and Technology – being elevated to university status to form the University of Strathclyde in 1964); an all new campus was constructed on the former site of Buchanan Street railway station in the early 1970s. GCT itself became a university in 1992 when it was renamed Glasgow Caledonian University, and has continued to grow and expand on the Cowcaddens site.

The southern fringes of Cowcaddens have historically housed one of Glasgow's premier entertainment districts, with theatres and cinemas dotted throughout the neighbourhood. Notable venues included: the Theatre Royal on Hope Street; The Royalty Theatre on Sauchiehall and Renfield Streets; The Grand Theatre at Cowcaddens Cross; The Scottish Zoo and Hippodrome on New City Road; The Pavilion Theatre on Renfield Street; Green's Playhouse, later the Apollo music hall on Renfrew Street; The Glasgow Film Theatre on Rose Street; The Scottish Television headquarters, built in 1972 and 1973 and opened in 1974 on the corner of Renfield Street and Cowcaddens Road. As of 2021, only the Royal, Pavilion, and GFT remain, and the site of the old Apollo is now home to a Cineworld. Since 1988 the Royal Conservatoire of Scotland, formerly RSAMD, has had its main campus on Renfrew Street, with another facility on Garscube Road. The former Cowcaddens Free Church now houses the National Piping Centre.

Housing in the area is primarily ex-council housing (there are no council houses in Glasgow since their transfer to the Glasgow Housing Association). The Dundasvale estate was built in two stages, the main part in 1968 which consisted of two 24-storey tower blocks, and seven deck access blocks with public car parking located in their lower level. A raised bowling green was also constructed as an amenity space. A third tower block (22 Dundasvale Court) was constructed in 1976 - identical in design to the previous two, making it one of the final council tower blocks erected in the city.

In 2007 the Cowcaddens pedestrian underpass was decorated with 15 screen prints by artist Ruth Barker.

== Cowcaddens Road ==
Notionally, Cowcaddens Road demarcates the northern boundary of the city centre. It has appeared on maps since at least 1560, as one continuous road that connected the small village of Cowcaddens to the burgeoning town of Glasgow. This was, until 1766, the Cow Lone, an unpaved road where herders would take their cattle up the hill to Cowcaddens where the animals would graze and be milked in the evening. This path would follow the alignment of current-day Queen Street, veering northwest off of George Square where Queen Street railway station is today. From there, it would join up with Buchanan Street, following toward Port Dundas before turning west into Cowcaddens Street.

The alignment of Cowcaddens Street was altered slightly during a redevelopment beginning in 1968 and continuing into the late 1970's. Several tenement blocks were demolished, and the road was brought slightly up the slope of Garnethill, and elevated. This facilitated new connections with Cambridge and Rose Streets, which both previously veered northwest into New City Road instead, as well as a new route into Great Western Road via West Graham Street, another new connection created by this new alignment. Other connections were severed however – New City Road chiefly among them. Itself vastly transformed by the construction of the M8 motorway, New City Road now leads into an underpass below Cowcaddens Road to the Subway – all that remains of Cowcaddens Cross. The road was also straightened and lengthened eastward to meet North Hanover Street, through where Buchanan Street railway station once stood. However, the original alignment of Cowcaddens Street is still preserved somewhat in Dundasvale Road, between the National Piping Centre and Garscube Road.

== Chinatown ==
Glasgows Chinatown is in the Cowcaddens area.

== People ==
The socialist politician Edward Hunter, who was instrumental in helping build the Left in New Zealand, was a Labour councillor for Cowcaddens from 1937 until 1959.

Jimmy Barnes and his elder brother John Swan (aka Swanee) spent their early childhood living in Cowcaddens before emigrating to Australia.

== See also ==
- Glasgow tower blocks
- STV
