= Ian Donald =

English physician

- Portrait of Ian Donald
- Born: 27 December 1910; Liskeard, England
- Died: 19 June 1987 (aged 76)
- Resting place: St Peters, Paglesham, England
- Education: Fettes College, University of Cape Town, University of London, University of Glasgow
- Known for: Developing obstetric ultrasound
- Awards: CBE
- Scientific career
- Fields: Obstetrics and Gynaecology
- Workplaces: St Thomas's Hospital Medical School, Royal Free Hospital, Western Infirmary

Ian Donald CBE FRFPSGlas FRCOG FRCP (27 December 1910 – 19 June 1987) was an English physician who pioneered the diagnostic use of ultrasound in obstetrics, enabling the visual discovery of abnormalities during pregnancy. Donald was born in Cornwall, England, to a Scottish family of physicians. He was educated in Scotland and South Africa before studying medicine at the University of London in 1930 and became the third generation of doctors in his family. At the start of World War II, Donald was drafted into the Royal Air Force as a medical officer, where he developed an interest in radar and sonar. In 1952, at St Thomas' Hospital, he used what he learned in the RAF to build a respirator for newborn babies with respiratory problems.

In 1952 Donald became a reader at Hammersmith Hospital. He developed a device called the Trip Spirometer, which measured the respiratory efficiency of a neonate. In 1953, he improved its design and made a positive-pressure respirator device that was known as the Puffer. In September 1954, Donald was promoted to Regius Professor of Obstetrics and Gynaecology at the University of Glasgow. While working at the Western Infirmary, he met Tom Brown, an industrial engineer who worked for Kelvin Hughes, which led to a series of collaborations between Western Infirmary clinicians and Kelvin Hughes' engineers. They designed and built a series of instruments that enabled the unborn to be examined with obstetric ultrasound, which allowed Donald to build the world's first obstetric ultrasound machine in 1963: the Diasonograph.

Donald also secured the construction of the Queen Mother's Maternity Hospital that was built next to the Royal Hospital for Children in Glasgow.

== Life ==
Ian Donald was born to John Donald and Helen née Barrow Wilson in 1910. His father was a general practitioner (GP) who came from a Paisley medical family, his grandfather also a GP, and his mother a concert pianist. Donald was the eldest of four children; his siblings were Margaret, Malcolm, and Alison Munro, who later became a leading headmistress.

Donald attended Warriston School in Moffat, and he attended Fettes College, Edinburgh, for secondary education. However, Donald never completed his education in Scotland, as the family moved to South Africa due to his father's poor health. Donald continued his secondary education at Diocesan College in Rondebosch, where he studied the classics, music, philosophy, and languages. In 1927, Donald's mother and two of his siblings contracted diphtheria and his mother died of a myocardial infarction. Three months later, Donald's father died. Maud Grant, the housekeeper, was provided with a trust fund to care for the children. In the same year, Donald was awarded a Bachelor of Arts (BA) in arts and music at the University of Cape Town graduating with first-class honours. (Note: Achieving a BA was considered a traditional route for entry to medical school.)

In 1930, the family moved back to London and Donald matriculated at the University of London to study medicine at the St Thomas's Hospital Medical School. In 1937 he achieved a Bachelor of Medicine, Bachelor of Surgery at St Thomas, becoming the third generation of doctors in Donald's family.

At the end of his graduate education, Donald married Alix Mathilde de Chazal Richards, a farmer's daughter from the Orange Free State. Donald retired on 1 October 1976. He was offered a consultancy at Nuclear Enterprises in Edinburgh, a position he held until 1981. After he fully retired, he moved to Paglesham. Donald died on 19 June 1987. He was survived by his wife, his four daughters and thirteen grandchildren. He is buried in the churchyard at St Peters Church in Paglesham, Essex.

== Career ==
Donald started his postgraduate medical training at the end of the 1930s, and planned to specialise in obstetrics with a position in Obstetrics and Gynaecology at St Thomas. He started his residency in 1939.

Donald's medical career was interrupted by World War II, and in May 1942 he was drafted into the Royal Air Force as a medical officer. He was so successful in the role that he was mentioned in dispatches for bravery after he pulled several airmen from a bomber that had crashed and had set on fire while the bombs were in the airframe. In 1946 he was awarded an MBE for bravery. During his time with the RAF, Donald became aware of a variety of techniques involving radar and sonar.

In 1946, Donald completed his war service and returned to work at St Thomas. In 1949, he was appointed as a tutor in the department of obstetrics and gynaecology. By 1949, the National Health Service had been in operation for three years, and instead of the continual search for money for patient care, money now came from government taxes, so the hospital's role changed from a needs-based approach to a focus on research: as part of their remit, each doctor had to conduct a research project.

=== Negative-pressure respirator ===
In partnership with Maureen Young, a specialist in perinatal physiology, Donald conducted a study of respiratory disorders in infants. Donald's study included an examination of available medical respirators, and he was not satisfied with the design and efficiency of the current models. As Donald had an interest in mechanical and technological devices from his childhood, he decided to build a new respirator. By 1952, Donald and Young had built a new medical negative-pressure respirator that they demonstrated at a Physiological Society meeting in the Royal Free Hospital.

=== Trip spirometer ===
Later in 1952, Donald resigned his role at St Thomas's Hospital Medical School to take up a position as a reader at the Institute of Obstetrics and Gynecology at Royal Postgraduate Medical School located in Hammersmith Hospital. At the medical school, Donald continued his research into neonatal breathing disorders. He worked to improve the device that he and Young had built: the servo patient-cycled respirator . Later, he worked with Josephine Lord, a registrar, to build the Trip spirometer, later called the spirometer, whose purpose was to measure the respiratory efficiency of a newborn. As well as being a diagnostic device, Donald used it to make a quantitative determination of normal respiration with the goal of determining the physiology and pathology of neonatal pulmonary disease.

=== Puffer ===
In 1953, Donald published a review of best practices in neonatal resuscitation. While at the school, Donald worked on a third device: a positive-pressure respirator. Donald found that the negative-pressure device he had built with Young was not ideal, as it was complicated to set up, difficult to use, and required more than one person to operate; the servo respirator seemed to be ideally suited to the long-term treatment of babies with breathing difficulties. His rationale for creating a new device was based on the idea that a respirator that could be used with a mask applied to a child in a cot or incubator was needed. He built a positive-pressure respirator that was later known in Hammersmith Hospital as the Puffer. It sent a stream of oxygen mixture onto the baby's face and the device could be applied to an ailing infant in under a minute. After treating several infants, colleagues asked him to convert the device to treat adults, which he did with successful outcomes. The device was noticed by the British Oxygen Company, who wanted to commercially develop the positive-pressure respirator.

In May 1954, Donald delivered the Blair-Bell Lecture at the Royal College of Obstetricians and Gynaecologists. He spoke about atelectasis neonatorum (the partial collapse of an infant's lung) and how his respirator could improve managing the condition. In the same period he met John J. Wild in London, who had discussed the use of ultrasound with him. Wild had used pulse-echo ultrasound to visualise abnormal tissue in the human breast. In September 1954, Donald was appointed by Hector Hetherington to Regius Professor of Midwifery. Hetherington had to confirm the position with the Secretary of State for Scotland, as it was a government appointment and Donald was proud of his commission that was signed personally by the Queen. Although Donald was impressed by Hetherington, he made it a condition of his employment that Hetherington had to promise to build a new maternity hospital in Glasgow, which was done.

=== Obstetric ultrasound ===
The Diasonograph, the first ever ultrasound scanner for use in obstetrics

Whilst Donald was Professor of Regius Midwifery at Glasgow University, he first explored the use of obstetric ultrasound in the 1950s in a collaboration with John MacVicar, a registrar and obstetrician in the Department of Obstetrics and Gynaecology at the Western Infirmary, and Tom Brown, an industrial engineer who worked for Kelvin & Hughes Scientific Instrument Company, developed the first contact compound sector scanner, and wrote an article in The Lancet: "Investigation of Abdominal Masses by Pulsed Ultrasound". The article contained the first published ultrasound image of a fetus.

The development of Donald's interest in ultrasound started when one of his patients introduced her husband to him. The patient's husband was the director of the boiler fabrication company Babcock and Wilcox, and he offered a tour of the plant to Donald, who accepted. The Renfrew company was a large user of industrial ultrasound that was used to check for crack and flaws in welds. Donald's purpose in making the visit to Renfrew on 21 July 1955 was to determine if the industrial detecting equipment could be used to differentiate types of tissue. He arrived at the plant with a number of fibroids and a large ovarian cyst taken from gynaecology patients. When Donald met Bernard Donnelly, an employee in the research department of the boilermaker, Donald asked him to demonstrate the device's use by taking an ultrasound image of the bone of his thumb. Donald experimented with the tissue samples along with a huge steak the company had provided for a control, and determined that ultrasound could be used to scan biological material. He stated:

All I wanted to know, quite simply, was whether these various masses differed in their ultrasonic echo characteristics. The results were beyond my wildest dreams and even with the primitive apparatus of those days clearly showed that a cyst produced echoes only at depth from the near and far walls, whereas a solid tumour progressively attenuated echoes at increasing depths of penetration.

When he returned to the hospital, Donald's goal was to find an ultrasound machine that he could continue to experiment with. He obtained a Kelvin Hughes Mark lIb supersonic flaw detector from William Valentine Mayneord at the Royal Cancer Hospital. While Mayneord had been experimenting with the machine in an attempt to image the brain, he had been unsuccessful in his efforts; Donald hoped he could replicate and improve upon his previous success. However, he found that when using the machine it could not produce echoes from less than 8 cm from the face of the transducer, making it almost useless for obstetric diagnostics. Donald experimented with balloons and condoms filled with water to widen the gap with little success. He was assisted by John Lenihan, a professor of clinical physics, who helped him form images, but the Mark IIb was insufficient for the task and the images produced were of very poor quality.

==== Experiments with A-mode scanner ====
In late 1956, Tom Brown, a research engineer with Kelvin & Hughes who had previously worked on an automatic flaw detector to test industrial products, became involved. Brown has learned from a colleague who had installed a specialist bulb in a Western Infirmary theatre, that Donald was using the flaw detector. Brown immediately looked up Donald and arranged a meeting. When they met, Brown noticed that the Mark lIb was not manufactured by Kelvin & Hughes, but instead had been manufactured under contract. He also noticed that the machine had been converted from using a double probe, one to produce pulses and one to receive the pulses, to a single probe. Not wanting to insult Donald by explaining why the machine was not working correctly, Brown offered to try and source another machine from somewhere. Brown phoned Alex Rankin, the man who collaborated with Brown on the automatic flaw detector for help and who later became director of the department of Medical Ultrasonics at the company. Rankin offered to gift the latest Mk IV flaw detector, which was subsequently forwarded to Glasgow Central station from the Barkingside Labs location for delivery to Brown. Rankin also spoke to the three directors at the company who decided to vote £500, a considerable sum in those days to support experiments.

An A-mode scan created by Ian Donald in 1956. Note the large non-reflective space between two echoes which marks the presence of a large ovarian cyst

The new machine considerably improved on the older machine with the difference being described as "chalk and cheese" by Donald. The Mk IV was a double transducer probe machine. At the same time, Brown found a Cossor oscilloscope camera that allowed images to be recorded on 35mm film. For Donald, the camera was particularly significant, as it enabled a record to be kept, an archive of images to be created that could be printed in published works. Donald set about establishing a framework of use for the device, how it could be used, what the information on the screen meant.

In 1956, the obstetrician John MacVicar was appointed as a registrar at the Western Infirmary and joined the team, By 1956 Donald and MacVicar became proficient with the machine after scanning 250 patients. For most of that period, they had tried to determine why particular scans produced a particular image. They discovered that if there was fluid in the abdomen, e.g. an ovarian cyst, there would be a clear gap in the image until the ultrasound reached the other side of the cyst. They then tried to distinguish between different ascites by matching images to particular type of ascites. They also investigated the shapes of images in the presence of uterine fibroids. Around that time, Edward Johnson Wayne of the Department of Medicine at the Western Infirmary had heard of Donald's research and was keen on a demonstration of the technique. Wayne invited Donald to use his detector on a woman who was dying from supposed stomach cancer. She was vomiting and losing weight rapidly; a barium x-ray had confirmed the diagnosis. Donald agreed with the diagnosis of ascites and applied the probe. They discovered that while they could use abdominal palpation to differentiate masses, Donald was using machinery to achieve the same result. MacVicar not knowing the background of the case, commented, "It looks like a cyst." Donald had to apologise to his colleagues, as the diagnosis of a cyst was preposterous. After a meeting to discuss the case, it was agreed that a laparotomy would be performed by Donald. To his surprise, he discovered it was a pseudomucinous cyst that filled the whole abdomen and was histologically benign.

Donald and MacVicar were pleased with the results from the machine and continued to experiment with how it could be used for diagnosis, but recognised that single dimension A-mode scanning was limited. The images produced by the device were still of poor quality and many still felt there was no future in the new machine. Donald learned of Douglass Howry's work in the United States, which found that an echo could only return to the probe and be recorded if the echo struck the reflecting surface at right angles as the laws of optics required. Brown felt that the A-scope presentation was incompatible with the nature of the problem, and that the image displayed did not correspond closely enough to the condition to enable a correct diagnosis. He believed that too much information was being returned in the image. For him, the problem was that there were many different echoes that were returned based on the number of body structures. Even the patient breathing or moving on the table affected the image. Brown saw this as a problem, and he planned to build a scanner that created an image that would be more useful for gynaecological diagnosis. Donald and Brown agreed to build a machine that used a rotating compound scanning search technique, like radar scanning a sector to increase the amount of echo information available.

==== Contact B-mode scanner ====
The solution proposed by Brown was to plot the position of the probe's echoes and create a two-dimensional picture. This type of device was known as a B-mode device. Unlike the A-mode device which used a single or double transducer and the function of depth to obtain a reading, the B-mode device uses a linear array of transducers that simultaneously scans a plane through the body that can be viewed as a two-dimensional image on a screen.

To start building the new scanner, Donald sent a letter to Ted Smith, a London-based salesman of Kelvin & Hughes, which became part of Smiths Industries. At the same time, Brown also approached deputy chairman Bill Slater, who sent him to see Bill Halliday, the company's chief research scientist for an opinion on building the machine. After Brown delivered his spiel to Halliday, it was several months before Brown received a reply in the form of a memo, which stated that £500 had been allocated by Smiths for the development and that Brown was able to spend half a day per week working with Donald.

The new B-mode scanner was also known as the bed-table scanner, and it was built out of an amalgamation of medical and industrial parts. Brown managed to scrounge an older Mark IV flaw detector in Glasgow along with a six-inch electrostatically deflected cathode-ray tube taken from the company stores in Glasgow. From the company's Barkingside R&D department, Brown found an experimental weld-testing machine. Both these machines were dismantled for parts. To measure the position of the transducer, Brown selected an "X-Y" orthogonal measuring frame system: it was measured in place by a sine/cosine potentiometer that was used to calculate the position of the transducer from the angle of its rotations. However, it was an expensive piece of equipment that cost more than their £500 budget; Brown managed to find a damaged component and repaired it. The machine was built on top an old hospital bed and made extensive use of Meccano chains and sprockets. By late 1957, the first contact B-mode scanner was constructed and in clinical use by that year. The A-mode scanner was moved to the Royal Maternity Hospital at Rottenrow where James Willocks, who joined the team in 1958, and Tom Duggan, a physicist hired by Donald in 1959, began to investigate fetal development with the instrument.

The initial test of the device was an ultrasound of MacVicar's abdomen. In the same year, Donald started to experiment with taking images of pregnancy, and discovered that their original theories about ascites were correct.

In a landmark paper on 7 June 1958 published by Donald, McVicar and Brown discussed the development of the A-mode scanner and decisions that led to the B-mode scanner. Donald and McVicar also described the first successful diagnosis using obstetric ultrasound with the B-mode machine, which occurred when a woman patient was diagnosed with terminal cancer of the stomach using traditional clinical methods, palpation and by X-ray. Donald diagnosed the woman with an ovarian cyst and when the woman was sent for a Laparotomy, a large cyst was discovered and removed. The paper highlighted the importance of the instant feedback that was available from the operating room to improve the quality of the image. Also described in the paper was a description of testing of ultrasound on the brains of kittens to determine if there was any obvious changes in tissue structure: there was none. The team's enthusiasm in the success of the B-mode and the publication of the paper resulted in a change in attitudes in the medical community and more confirmed that medical diagnosis could be made.

==== Automatic scanner ====
Between 1958 and 1959, Donald became increasingly worried about scanning tissue deliberately to ensure he received sufficient detail, from fear of missing them. He and MacVicar had been trying unsuccessfully to image hydatidiform moles by increasing the amplification of the signal, which resulted in an increase of what Donald called "electronic grass". He stated:

With high gain settings we were confronted with the danger of being deceived by "electronic grass". This danger now seemed so great that we decided to eliminate at least this error from over amplification and observer error by having an automatic scanner which would operate at a completely standardised speed.

In 1958, Brown and the engineers at Hughes started work on the new automatic scanner. It was built to standardise the compound scanning process and to remove, as much as possible, operator bias from the results.

The probe was mounted in a steel ball connected to a column suspended from a gantry that oscillated. When it was at a 30° angle to the normal of the skin, sensed by what Brown described as "rather indelicate looking projections on either side of the ball", the motion was reversed and the gantry supporting the column moved about 15 mm, and the process was repeated. The scans could be done in the longitudinal plane, i.e. up or down the abdomen lengthways, rather than only across the width. The machine had to be capable of scanning all the different sizes and shapes of the female form, and not only did it need to deal with the convex shape of a woman's abdomen, but also with women who were ill, pregnant, very rotund, or had some other form of pathology. Brown designed this motion of maintaining contact with the body's surface by using another motor that would reposition the probe as required. It was coupled with a pressure sensitive switch that enabled the probe to stay in constant contact with the skin. The machine had two motors: one for vertical and another for horizontal movement. However, the climbing of steep curves of heavier women presented its own problem. A control circuit was created that could switch between the two motors. The final part was a joystick that allowed the initial position to be set on the body for the scan.

It was the only automatic scanner built due to funding problems and the complex nature of the machine, with regular maintenance needed to keep the valve electronics functional. In December 1959, Donald met with Slater at the Kelvin Hughes factory, who expressed a desire to withdraw due to the increasing and unmanageable costs; the original £500 allocated to the project had stretched into thousands of pounds and the company could no longer afford it. The running costs for the project were being met by the Scottish Endowments Hospital Trust, but did not provide funding capital expenditure. Donald consulted with Hetherington, who produced £750 as a temporary measure while other funds were sought. Donald then approached the Scottish Hospital Endowments Research Trust and the Department of Health for Scotland. Slater and Donald attended a lunch party with the trust, who provided a grant of £4,000. The Trust sought assistance from the National Research Development Corporation in London, who provided them an immediate grant of £4,000 that was later supplemented with additional funding, up to £10,000 over several years. The financial security was to last until 1965.

For much of this period, Donald used his position as Regius Professor and his personal charisma to sell the potential of the ultrasound machine. In 1959, Swedish obstetrician Bertil Sundén of Lund University, Sweden, visited Glasgow to find a subject for his MD thesis. Glasgow University had established links with Lund University since John Martin Munro Kerr's time. Lars Leksell of Lund had been experimenting with ultrasound since the 1950s, and had been using a Kelvin and Hughes supersonic detector for experimentation. Leksell's work was well known to obstetrics and gynaecology professor Alf Sjövall, who was friends with Donald and knew his work; as such, Sjövall sent Sundén to Glasgow. During the visit, Sundén wanted to reproduce Donald's work from scratch. Despite the fact that the automatic scanner was almost completed, Sundén wanted an exact copy of the machine which Donald had used to produce his first publications: a bed-table scanner. The result was an order for a new ultrasound machine costing £2,500. It was the first direct-contact scanning machine built in the world, and was a hybrid between the manually operated bed-table machine and the automatic scanner. The prototype became the basis for the Diasonograph, which became the first commercially produced machine in 1965.

Around this time, Donald gave a series of lectures in the US. In 1960 he, MacVicar, and Brown demonstrated their scanner at a medical exhibition in Olympia, London, England. During this period Donald and his team scanned hundreds of patients who were both pregnant and non-pregnant, and Donald found that fetal echoes were visible at an early stage, which led to the distinction between a case of threatened abortion and a case with a hydatidiform mole, both with bleeding. The image showed a speckled picture, whereas the fetus produced strong echoes floating in space containing liquid. Donald received many requests for differential diagnosis, so the work was moved to the X-ray department. Meanwhile, Donald noticed the very sharp echoes that were being produced at the sides of an infant's head, which led to the use of a hand-held probe and the A-mode scanner to detect the presentation of the fetus. Donald's ward sister at Rottenrow, Marjory Marr, used the technique to test doubtful cases in her antenatal ward and was able to tell Donald in advance where the fetus lay, which led Donald to think about measuring the distance between the echoes as an index of the head by using the biparietal diameter. Experiments proved the idea was feasible. Duggan created a ranging unit in which the distance between echoes could be calculated in centimetres and millimetres. James Willocks, a physician who worked with Donald in the same department at Rottenrow, undertook many hundreds of experiments using the new technique resulting in errors of less than 2% over 75% of cases. The use of serial measurements of the fetal head was the first study to use ultrasound to measure fetal growth. Donald presented the results of the experiments at a meeting of the Royal Society of Medicine on 12 January 1962.

By 1970, Donald could image fetal development during pregnancy using the Diasonograph, which led to new criteria diagnosing pregnancy failure, and resulted in his techniques being widely adopted as standard clinical practice in the 1970s.

== Queen Mother's Maternity Hospital ==
The idea of a new maternity hospital had been on Donald's mind when he was asked what plans he had should he be appointed during his interview for being hired as a professor. He was in charge of a maternity unit at the Glasgow Royal Maternity and Women's Hospital that was colloquially known as Rottenrow, which was already very old and unfit for purpose.

Donald's first objective was to obtain the money to build the hospital. He contacted the Scottish Office repeatedly until he received funding but it was insufficient to build the whole hospital: a sum of £800,000 was needed. Donald then turned to Glasgow University to request more funding and it was secured by Hetherington. When the Western Regional Hospital Board decided to build the hospital in the grounds of the old Robroyston hospital in the north-east of Glasgow, Hetherington quietly stood up during the meeting and stated: "You must excuse me, gentleman, for you must know that if the proposal goes ahead the university can have no further interest in the project." The planning board reversed their decision and agreed to build the hospital in Yorkhill, next to the Royal Hospital for Children. In early 1958, Donald appointed the architect Joseph Lea Gleave, and together they produced a new design for a 112-bed maternity hospital.

Traditionally, maternity hospitals consisted of two wards: antenatal and postnatal. Antenatal wards were for undelivered patients, and postnatal for patients who were recovering from delivery. Wards were communal with privacy guaranteed by curtains. Deliveries would generally take place in the labour ward, and only complicated deliveries or Caesarean sections were taken to the operating theatre. Donald's plan was for a hospital with a central block with four wings. The central block had separate nursing, medical, and anaesthetic staff, a separate delivery room for each woman, and two operating rooms for complicated cases. The east wing had a separate room for each woman and was reserved for complicated cases. The other wings were shared among senior consultants with their own junior staff in small four- and six-bed wards. Antenatal and postnatal women were mixed. At the end of the hospital was the university department and tower block for residents and nursing staff.

Construction began in June 1960 and Donald appointed Marr to be the master of works, who would give progress reports to Donald each day. The name of the new hospital was chosen by Donald, who was a great admirer of Queen Elizabeth The Queen Mother. The hospital was the first to have a separate ultrasound examination room.

In 1961, Donald wrote a detailed article in the Scottish Medical Journal for a series on hospital planning, in which he described the acute need for new maternity beds in Glasgow, the design of the new hospital, the reason the Yorkhill site was chosen, and why he believed that the increasingly rapid pace of medical research would make the new hospital obsolete within 25 years. The new hospital opened on 11 January 1964, with the first baby being delivered on 12 January 1964, and closed on 13 January 2010.

== Health ==
For much of his life, Donald suffered from valvular heart disease as a result of him and his sister Margaret being infected with rheumatic fever when he was young. His sister had died from a mitral valve replacement surgery that was still in the early stages of development. In the autumn of 1961, Donald collapsed in New York with atrial fibrillation, and he traveled back to the Western Infirmary for treatment with a mitral valve replacement. The condition meant that he suffered many debilitating illnesses, heart attacks, and conditions like pressure sores, blood clots, and hematomas that led to further cardiac deterioration, necessitating a new operation.

Over four years, Donald underwent three major heart operations at Hammersmith Hospital. For the third operation, a mitral valve replacement was taken from a pig, with a homograft that was replaced with a Starr Edwards artificial valve in 1976. Donald published personal accounts of his second and third cardiac operations.

== Bibliography ==
- Donald, Ian (25 June 2016). "Sonar: What it Can and Cannot Do in Obstetrics". Scottish Medical Journal. 19 (5): 203–210. doi:10.1177/003693307401900501. PMID 4415841. S2CID 955399.
- Donald, Ian; Macvicar, J; Brown, T.G (June 1958). "Investigation of Abdominal Masses by Pulsed Ultrasound". The Lancet. 271 (7032): 1188–1195. doi:10.1016/S0140-6736(58)91905-6. PMID 13550965.
- Ainsworth, Steve (March 2005). "Good vibrations". The Practising Midwife. 8 (3). England: 50. ISSN 1461-3123. PMID 16250436.
- Nicolson, M; Fleming J; Spencer I (February 2005). "Hyaline membrane and neonatal radiology--Ian Donald's first venture into imaging research". Scottish Medical Journal. 50 (1). Scotland: 35–7. doi:10.1177/003693300505000115. ISSN 0036-9330. PMID 15792390. S2CID 46234637.
- Donald, Ian; Brown T G (July 1995). "Localisation using physical devices, radioisotopes and radiographic methods. I.--Demonstration of tissue interfaces within the body by ultrasonic echo sounding. 1961". The British Journal of Radiology. 68 (811). ENGLAND: H129–36. ISSN 0007-1285. PMID 7640920.
- Donald, Ian (April 1961). "III. The New Yorkhill Maternity Hospital". Scottish Medical Journal. 6 (4): 164–169. doi:10.1177/003693306100600407. PMID 13723682. S2CID 35055266.
- MacVicar, John; Donald, Ian (June 1963). "Sonar in the Diagnosis of Early Pregnancy and ITS Complications". BJOG: An International Journal of Obstetrics and Gynaecology. 70 (3): 387–395. doi:10.1111/j.1471-0528.1963.tb04920.x. S2CID 72553993.

== Awards and honours ==
- Blair gold medal
- Eardley Holland gold medal
- Victor Bonney prize
- Maternity prize of the European Association of Perinatal Medicine
- First Honorary Life Member of the British Medical Ultrasound Society (1982) along with Tom Brown.

== Notes ==
Academic offices
Preceded by Robert Aim Lennie	Regius Professor of Obstetrics and Gynaecology in Glasgow; 1955–1976	Succeeded by Charles Richard Whitfield
