= William Cumin (obstetrician) =

British doctor

William Cumin (died 17 January 1854) was Regius Professor of Obstetrics and Gynaecology at the University of Glasgow between 1834 and 1840.

He was the son of Patrick Cumin (died 27 October 1820), professor of oriental languages at the University of Glasgow, and his wife Rachael Baird. The Scottish philosopher David Hume in a letter to Adam Smith in June 1761 had recommended Cumin's father for his position.

William Cumin had been both a surgeon in the army, and later a professor of botany at Anderson College, Glasgow, before his appointment to succeed Robert Lee to the Chair of Midwifery in 1834.

Cumin left the University of Glasgow in 1840 to take up residence at Clifton, Bristol. He married Ann Johnstone Ker at Glasgow and at Edinburgh in 1821. Cumin died at Bath in 1854. His grandson, Henry Patrick Cholmeley, MB from the University of Oxford in 1886, was the author of John of Gaddes and the Rosa Medicinae (1912).

Cumin's niece, Robina Anne Wilson (30 November 1813 – 28 July 1855), the wife of Leopold Cattani Cavalcanti, is buried at the celebrated Protestant Cemetery at Florence with, among other members of the expatriate British community, the poet Elizabeth Barrett Browning.

== Bibliography ==
- Bryce, J. C. and Skinner, A. S. (editors) (1976) The Glasgow Edition of the Works and Correspondence of Adam Smith, Oxford, Oxford University Press.
- Comrie, John D. (1927) History of Scottish Medicine to 1860, London, Ballière, Tindall & Cox.
