= Samuel James Cameron =

British obstetrician (1878–1959)

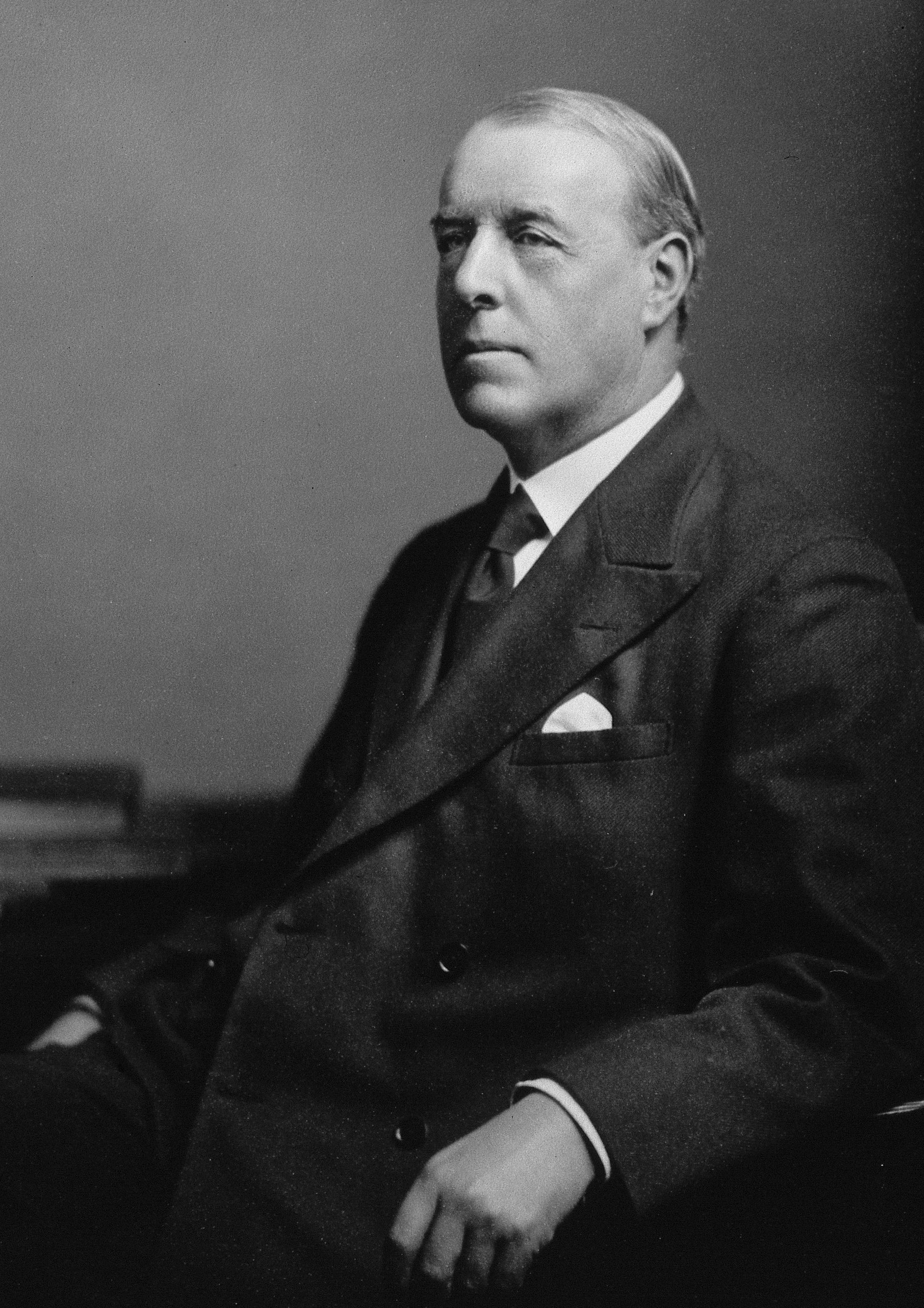
Samuel James Cameron in 1934

Samuel James Cameron (7 January 1878 – 29 October 1959) was Regius Professor of Midwifery at the University of Glasgow from 1934 until 1942. The son of Caesarean Section pioneer Prof Murdoch Cameron, S.J. Cameron was a foundation Fellow of Royal College of Obstetricians and Gynaecologists in 1929, and for many years a member of the Gynaecological Visiting Society. A lifelong champion of the reputation of the founder of professional midwifery in the British isles, William Smellie, Cameron both named a maternity hospital at Lanark, Scotland, after him and saved Smellie's library from permanent loss.

== Professional life ==
Sam Cameron graduated from the University of Glasgow MB Ch.B, with commendation, in 1901. Among his professional appointments he spent a year as house-surgeon at the Chelsea Hospital for Woman, in London, working under the pre-eminent British surgeons, Sir John Bland-Sutton, Victor Bonney and Sir Comyns Berkeley, forming enduring friendships with all three. Later he became head of the gynaecological wards at Glasgow's Western Infirmary and in 1920 was appointed head of a gynaecological unit at the Glasgow Royal Maternity Hospital. In October 1934 he succeeded to his father's former position, replacing John Martin Munro Kerr in the chair of Regius Professor of Midwifery at the University of Glasgow.

A popular teacher, Cameron was famous for his notably quick surgical technique. He published four medical textbooks, including A Manuel of Gynaecology: For Students and Practitioners (1915). After his retirement in 1942 Cameron was awarded an honorary LLD by the University of Glasgow.

== William Smellie ==
Throughout his professional life Cameron championed the reputation of the father of modern midwifery in the British isles, William Smellie. In October 1956 he gave the first William Smellie lecture to the Glasgow Obstetrical Society having previously led the campaign for the renovation of Smellie's tomb and having played the decisive role in the efforts to salvage Smellie's library at Lanark.

In 1929, in his Presidential address to the Glasgow Obstetric and Gynaecological Society Cameron said of Smellie: ‘Looking backwards, I see Smellie’s figure towering above all other’s […] As the founder of the modern practice of obstetrics, this plain, blunt, and indefatigable Scot has left a memory, to be cherished by all interested in this special department of medicine’.

In honour of the plain and indefatigable Scot Cameron, instrumental in the foundation of a maternity hospital at Lanark, named it the William Smellie Memorial Hospital.

== Personal life ==
A lifelong art collector, Sam Cameron's collection at his country residence at Stobieside, near Drumclog, Lanarkshire included works by the Scottish painters Allan Ramsay and Sir Henry Raeburn. Cameron also commissioned Denis Peploe, son of the Scottish painter, S.J. Peploe, to sculpt a statue of mother and child, which he gave to the William Smellie Memorial Hospital.

In 1908 S.J. Cameron married Marion Lean, daughter of Daniel Lean the wealthy Scots muslin manufacturer, the value of whose estate ranked him fifth in the top ten wealthiest Scots to die in 1898. Samuel James Cameron died at Stobieside in 1959.

== Bibliography ==
- A Manuel of Gynaecology: For Students and Practitioners, 1915, London, Edward Arnold.
- A Glasgow Manual of Obstetrics (co-authored with John Hewitt, Archibald N McLellan, Robert A Lennie and John Hewitt), 1924, London, Edward Arnold.
- Difficult Labour (co-authored with John Hewitt), 1926, London, Edward Arnold.
- Uterine Haemorrhage (co-authored with John Hewitt), 1926, London, Edward Arnold.

== Bibliography ==
- The Glasgow Herald, Glasgow, 30 October 1959.
- Peel, John (1976) The Lives of the Fellows of the Royal College of Obstetricians and Gynaecologists: 1929–1969, London, Heinemann Medical Books.
