= James Hendry (obstetrician) =

Scottish obstetrician (1885–1945)

James Hendry (25 September 1885 – 9 September 1945) was Regius Professor of Midwifery at the University of Glasgow from 1943 until his death in 1945.

Hendry was born at Beith, Ayrshire, to John Hendry, a butcher, and his wife Maggie Allan. He graduated with an MB from the University of Glasgow in 1910. After his graduation he spent two years studying obstetrics and gynaecology at Paris and at Freiburg, Germany.

In 1913 he returned to Glasgow to act as a Professorial Assistant to John Martin Munro Kerr, Muirhead Professor of Obstetrics and Gynaecology at the University of Glasgow. In 1927 he succeeded Munro Kerr as Muirhead Professor on Munro Kerr's election to replace Murdoch Cameron as Regius Professor of Midwifery.

At Aberdeen in 1914 Hendry married Harriet Elizabeth Williamson. During World War I Hendry served as a Major in Royal Army Medical Corps in France.

Hendry was a member of the Gynaecological Visiting Society, a member of the Council of the Royal College of Obstetricians and Gynaecologists and a member of the Nuffield Hospital's Trust.

In 1943 he succeeded Samuel James Cameron as Regius Professor of Midwifery at Glasgow. He became ill shortly after his election but carried on with his duties until he died of lung cancer in 1945.

== Bibliography ==
- Peel, John (1976) The Lives of the Fellows of the Royal College of Obstetricians and Gynaecologists: 1929-1969, London, Heinemann Medical Books
