= Murdoch Cameron =

British physician

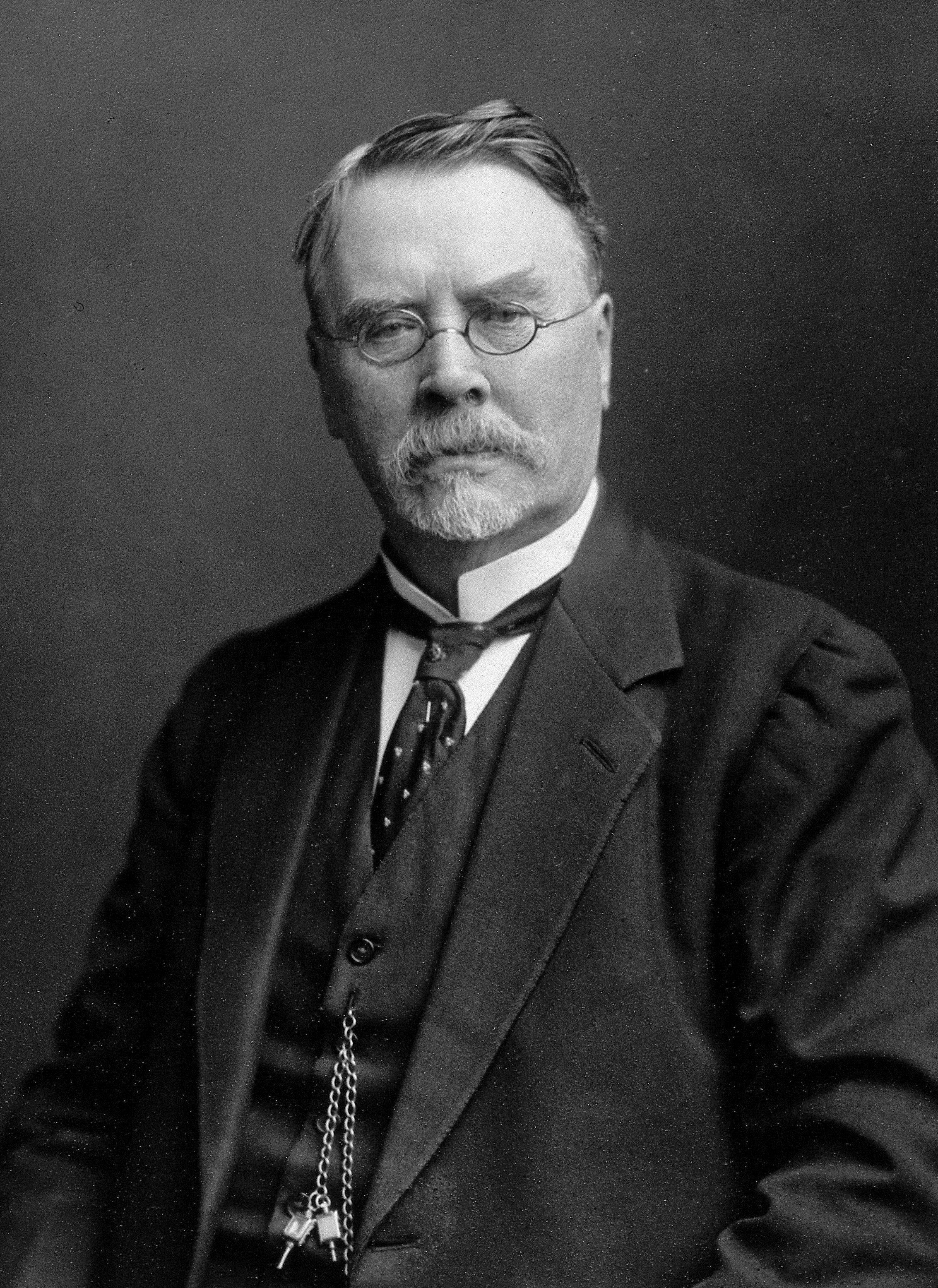
Murdoch Cameron

Murdoch Cameron (31 March 1847 – 28 April 1930) was Regius Professor of Obstetrics and Gynaecology at the University of Glasgow from 1894 to 1926. He was a pioneer of the Caesarean section under modern antiseptic conditions, becoming world famous after the success of his first such operation in 1888, at what was then the Glasgow Lying-in Hospital and Dispensary, now the Princess Royal Maternity Hospital, an institution he was deeply involved with. He was honorary President of the first international Congress on Obstetrics and Gynaecology, in 1892. His son Samuel James Cameron followed in his footsteps, becoming Reguis Professor of Midwifery at Glasgow in the 1930s.

== Early life ==
Murdoch Cameron was born in Glasgow in 1847 the son of a successful timber merchant, Samuel Cameron (25 June 1811 – 27 January 1886), who originated from the Gaelic-speaking farming communities on the Isle of Mull, Argyllshire, and his wife Mary Clow, daughter of William Clow of Drymen, Stirlingshire. He studied medicine at the University of Glasgow qualifying as MB in 1870, and MD in 1872.

== Early professional life ==
Specialising in obstetrics at his practice in the Townhead district of Glasgow, Cameron was almost immediately appointed Physician to the Glasgow Lying-in Hospital after his graduation. He retained this post until becoming Physician Accoucher to Glasgow's Western Infirmary in 1878. From about 1884 he acted as Professorial Assistant to William Leishman, Professor of Midwifery at Glasgow. And in 1888 he was appointed Obstetric Physician to the Glasgow Royal Maternity Hospital. He also acted as lecturer on gynaecology at Glasgow Queen Margaret's College and was a leading fundraiser for the campaign to erect a new Glasgow Royal Maternity Hospital on the Rottenrow site in 1880–1.

== Caesarean section ==
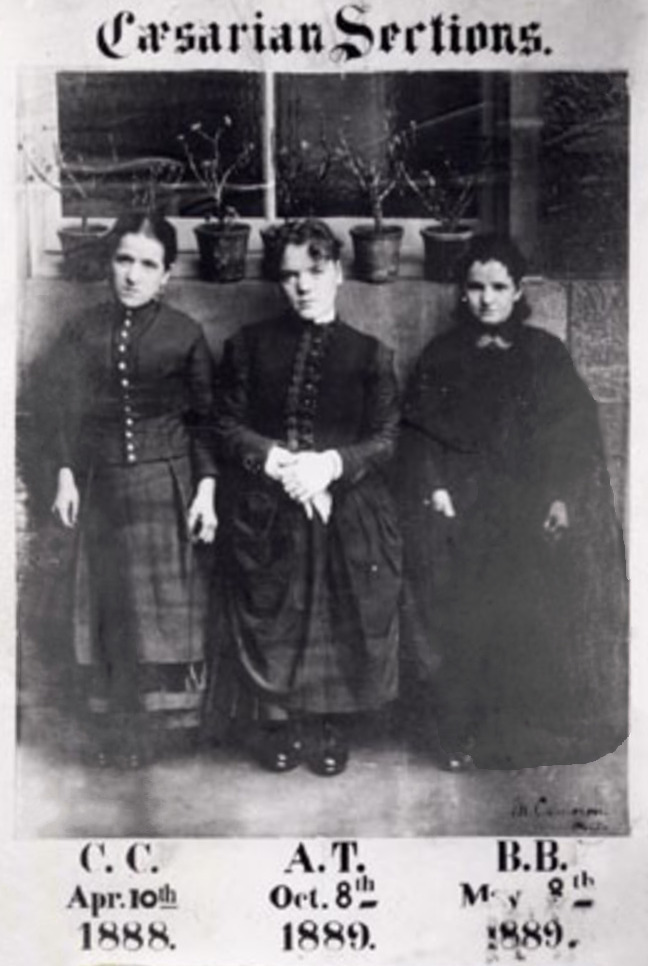
First three Caesarean section patients

In an improvised operating theatre crowded with doctors and undergraduates on the top floor of the Glasgow Royal Maternity Hospital on 10 April 1888, Murdoch Cameron carried out the first Caesarean section under modern antiseptic conditions. The patient, Catherine Colquhoun, was a rachitic dwarf (i.e. her skeleton was affected by rickets) and so was incapable of natural birth. Cameron, who as an undergraduate had worked as a surgical dresser to the pioneer of antiseptic surgery Joseph Lister at Glasgow Royal Infirmary, helped transform the Caesarean section, under antiseptic conditions, from a dreaded and little used procedure, that usually ended with the death of the mother, into the routine and safe operation it has become.

== Controversial appointment ==
In recognition of his pioneering work Cameron was appointed honorary President of the first international Congress on Obstetrics and Gynaecology, held in Brussels, in 1892. In 1894, on the recommendation of the Secretary of State for Scotland, Sir George Trevelyan, Murdoch Cameron succeeded Leishman to the position of Professor of Midwifery at the University of Glasgow.

It was an appointment that created furious controversy in some quarters. In an anonymous letter to The Times, London, on 8 January 1894, one correspondent condemned Murdoch Cameron's election as 'a heavy blow to the prestige and prosperity of Scotch Universities'. Dr Cameron's only claim to the position, the correspondent wrote, was that he 'is an ardent Gladstonian partisan'.

Nevertheless, Cameron held the position of Professor of Midwifery for thirty-two years, and was awarded an honorary LLD for 'a long period of faithful, useful and distinguished service' by the University of Glasgow at his retirement. During four decades of academic teaching, Cameron taught four of his successors to the Chair of Midwifery: John Martin Munro Kerr, Samuel James Cameron, James Hendry and Robert Aim Lennie. Murdoch Cameron died in Glasgow in 1930.

== Boer War Incident ==
In a famous incident on 23 February 1900, a large crowd of students at the University of Glasgow surrounded the German lecturer, Professor Alexander Tille. The students berated Professor Tille, first English translator of Nietzsche's Thus Spoke Zarathustra, for an article in Die Woche in which he condemned British conduct in the Boer War. As the students attempted to strip the unapologetic Tille of his professorial gown, he sought refuge in Murdoch Cameron's lecture room. Cameron, acting as mediator between the students and Tille, arranged a meeting between both sides. At the conclusion of which Professor Cameron, asking the students to 'forgive and forget', shook hands with Tille on their behalf.

== A Medical Family ==
Murdoch Cameron married Agnes Wallace at Kilsyth, Stirlingshire in 1873. He was the father of Samuel James Cameron, successor to the Regius chair of Midwifery at Glasgow in the 1930s. Murdoch Cameron's fourth child, Agnes Wallace Cameron, was among the first generation of female medical graduates from a Scottish University. Graduating MB from Glasgow in 1904, Dr A. W. Cameron was later a paediatric specialist to Glasgow Parish Council. Cameron's eldest daughter, Jean Wallace Cameron, was Matron of the Stirling Maternity Hospital in the 1920s and '30s. While his second daughter, Mary Clow Cameron, was lecturer in French at the University of Glasgow, who with her husband, Leon Maurice Pitoy, Chevalier Légion d’honneur, also lecturer in French at Glasgow, founded the Pitoy French language prize at the university in 1938.

== Bibliography ==
- Whose Who of Glasgow, 1909, Glasgow, Gowans & Gray.
- Who Was Who 1929–1940, 1941, London, Black.
