= James Towers (disambiguation) =

James Towers (1897–1977) was a British soldier.

James or Jim Towers may also refer to:

- James Towers (obstetrician) (1757–1820), Scottish obstetrician
- James S. Towers (1859–1926), American politician
- Jim Towers (1933–2010), English footballer

== See also ==
- James Towers English (1782–1819), Irish commander of British forces
