= Regius Professor of Obstetrics and Gynaecology (Glasgow) =

Regius Professorship at the University of Glasgow

The Regius Chair of Obstetrics and Gynaecology is a Regius Professorship at the University of Glasgow. It was founded in 1815 as the Regius Chair of Midwifery by King George III of Great Britain. From 1790 to 1815 the subject was taught by a lecturer on the Waltonian Foundation. The name was changed to Obstetrics and Gynaecology in 1992.

== Regius Professors of Midwifery/Regius Professors of Obstetrics and Gynaecology ==
- James Towers CM (1815)
- John Towers MA CM (1820)
- Robert Lee MD FRS (1834)
- William Cumin MA MD (1834)
- John Macmichan Pagan MD (1840)
- William Leishman MD (1868)
- Murdoch Cameron MD LLD (1894)
- John Martin Munro Kerr MD LLD (1927)
- Samuel James Cameron MB LLD (1934)
- James Hendry MA MB BSc (1943)
- Robert Aim Lennie MD LLD (1946)
- Ian Donald CBE BA MD (1955)
- Charles Richard Whitfield MD FRCOG FRCPSGlas (1976)
- Iain T Cameron BSc MD MA (1993)
- Ian A Greer (2000) MD MRCP FRCP MRCOG MFFP
- Jane Norman (2007)

== See also ==
- List of Professorships at the University of Glasgow
