= Charles Richard Whitfield =

Northern Irish obstetrician and gynaecologist

Charlie Whitfield
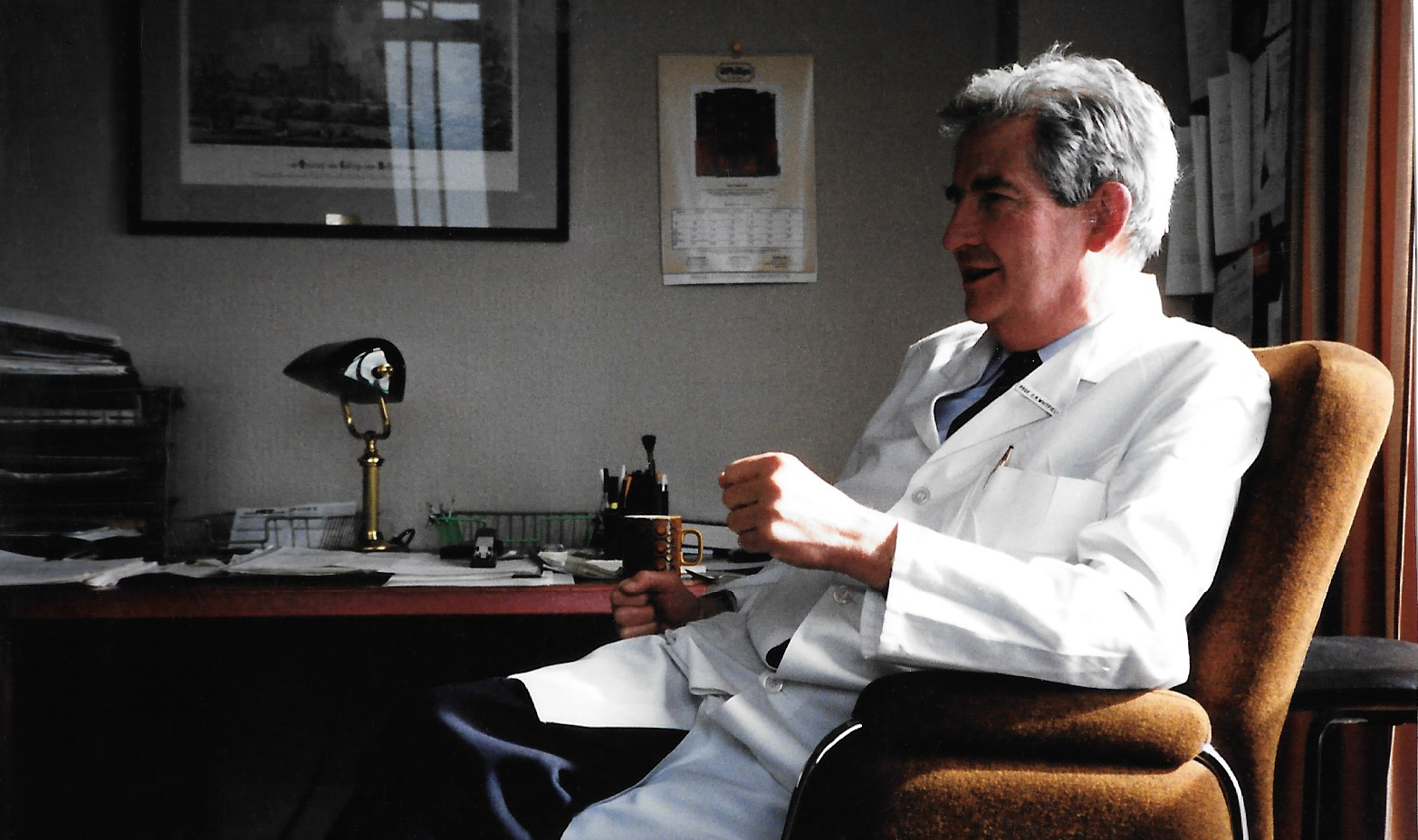
- Charles Whitfield in his office at the Queen Mother's Hospital in Glasgow
- Born: Charles Richard Whitfield; 21 October 1927; Secunderabad, British India
- Died: 13 September 2018 (aged 90); Bearsden, Glasgow, UK
- Education: Queen's University Belfast
- Occupations: Obstetrician and gynaecologist
- Years active: 42

Charles Richard Whitfield FRCOG, FRCP(G) (21 October 1927 – 13 September 2018) was a Northern Irish obstetrician and gynaecologist who was a pioneer of maternal-fetal (perinatal) medicine. His primary interest was in fetal medicine, a branch of obstetrics and gynaecology that focuses on the assessment of the development, growth and health of the baby in the womb. He was also an early proponent of subspecialisation within the fields of obstetrics and gynaecology, a practice that is common today.

He was Regius Professor of Midwifery at the University of Glasgow from 1976 until his retirement in 1992.

== Early life and education ==
Charlie Whitfield was born in 1927 to Charles and Aileen Whitfield in Secunderabad, India, where his father, himself an obstetrician and gynaecologist, was serving in the Royal Army Medical Corps (RAMC). He attended Cabin Hill School and Campbell College Belfast 1942–1945, where he represented the school at Rugby Football, Cricket and Shooting 1944–1945 and was secretary of the Debating Society 1944–1945. He subsequently took a degree in medicine at Queen's University Belfast where he graduated MB BCh BAO in 1950. In 1953 he married Marion Douglas McKinney in Belfast.

== Career ==
Whitfield began his career with resident appointments in the Belfast Teaching Hospitals 1951–1953. He then served in the RAMC 1953–1964 as junior and senior specialist in obstetrics and was posted to David Bruce Royal Naval Hospital Mtarfa, Malta 1954–1957, Louise Margaret Hospital, Aldershot 1957–1959, BMH (British Military Hospital) Colchester 1959–1960, and BMH Singapore 1960–1963. He left the army in 1964 having reached the rank of lieutenant colonel.

=== Belfast, electronic fetal monitoring and rhesus disease ===
Whitfield returned to Northern Ireland as senior lecturer in midwifery and gynaecology, Queen's University Belfast, and honorary consultant, Belfast Teaching Hospitals 1964–1968. He was made MD in 1965. He later became consultant obstetrician and gynaecologist, Belfast Teaching Hospitals 1968–1974 and honorary reader, Queen's University Belfast 1971–1974.

In 1964 he was granted an honorary attachment to the department of Ian Donald, the medical ultrasound pioneer from Glasgow, whom he would later succeed. Whitfield was then awarded the United States Public Health Service Research Fellowship under Edward H. Hon at Yale University, New Haven, Connecticut, and Stanley T. Lee at the Loma Linda University Medical Centre, California 1964–1965. He returned to Belfast where he was the first to practice Hon's electronic fetal heart rate monitoring methods.

This was a period of change in his field, when obstetricians "gradually changed their motto from that of Masterly Inactivity to that of Active Intervention". Whitfield later reflected on this period, comparing the plight of the fetus, the "second patient", to that of the early astronauts:

"The fetus was, of course, the subject that was really exercising most of us, and of our two patients, it is the one that, generally speaking, is at most danger. And this was at a time when astronauts were beginning to go up in the sky and ... they were able to stick transducers on the astronauts so nobody ever had to ask them what they were doing, or how they were feeling, and they didn't even need to take pictures of them. In the meantime, here was the fetus and all we could do was listen to its heartbeat and try to feel its outline".

He concluded, "it was now that fetal phonocardiography and electrocardiography and ultrasound became the parents of real fetal medicine".

Whitfield concentrated on research into the management of pregnancies affected by Rhesus haemolytic disease, a condition that affected 15% of all admissions to Belfast's Royal Maternity Hospital at one time. Assessing the severity of cases through the analysis of amniotic fluid, he developed his Action Line method 1968 to determine the timing of necessary intervention either by premature induced delivery or by fetal transfusion. The Action Line method resulted in striking reductions in both fetal mortality and prematurity in Rhesus-affected pregnancies.

=== Glasgow and ultrasound ===
After a short spell as Professor of Obstetrics and Gynaecology at the University of Manchester and Honorary Consultant at the University Hospital of South Manchester 1974–1976, Whitfield took up his final position as Regius Professor of Midwifery at the University of Glasgow and Honorary Consultant at the Queen Mother's Hospital and Western Infirmary 1976, succeeding Ian Donald with whom he had first worked 12 years previously. He was made FRCS(G) in 1977 and retired Emeritus Regius Professor of Midwifery (Glasgow) in 1992.

The use of ultrasound in medicine was pioneered by Donald, first at Glasgow Royal Maternity Hospital and subsequently at Glasgow's new maternity hospital, the Queen Mother's Hospital (QMH), which opened in 1964. Developments in ultrasound complemented Whitfield's own research interests in fetal medicine but was still regarded with scepticism in some quarters. Whitfield had more success in gaining acceptance for obstetric ultrasound than Donald himself, who was sometimes viewed as an obsessive eccentric. As he recalled, "an honorary attachment with Professor Donald in Glasgow in 1964 had convinced me that obstetric ultrasound did have a future, but later in that year in America I was told it was just a dream of a mad, red-headed Scotsman, so I should forget it! I was told confidentially, nothing, no good will come of it, but of course that was wrong".

By the end of the 1980s, 87% of pregnant women in Scotland would undergo at least one ultrasound scan during the course of their pregnancy, a task increasingly undertaken by midwives (as opposed to doctors or radiologists), an innovation first introduced at QMH.

=== Royal College of Obstetricians and Gynaecologists (RCOG) ===
Throughout his career, Whitfield played an active role in the Royal College of Obstetricians and Gynaecologists (RCOG). He became a Member (MRCOG) in 1959, a Fellow (FRCOG) in 1969, was a member of the Gynaecological Visiting Society (GVS) and a member of RCOG Council 1985–1991. He gave the William Blair-Bell memorial lecture entitled "Obstetric Sprue" in 1969. Whitfield embarked on two travelling assignments on behalf of the college: the Bernhard Baron Travelling Fellowship to the United States in 1974, and the Sims Black Travelling Professorship to Thailand and Bangladesh in 1985.

He served on numerous College committees, boards and working parties. Principal among these was his role as chairman of the Working Party on Subspecialisation, which published its report in 1982. The working party recommended a less formal approach to subspecialisation whereby generalists could develop an interest in a subspecialty field without undertaking full training. Many in the field of obstetrics and gynaecology had to be convinced of the merits of these recommendations. To that end Whitfield, along with members of the working party, embarked on a tour of the country to convince the doubters. Their success in this venture led to the formation of the RCOG Subspecialty Committee 1984 which, to this day, advises on the development of subspecialisation in the four fields of gynaecological oncology, reproductive medicine, maternal and fetal medicine, and urogynaecology.

=== Editorships ===
- Medical Disorders in Pregnancy 1977.
- Dewhurst's Textbook of Obstetrics and Gynaecology for Postgraduates, 4th and 5th editions 1986 and 1995.
