= Alison Munro =

British civil servant and headmistress (1914–2008)

Dame Alison Munro DBE
- Portrait by Walter Bird, 1959
- Born: 12 February 1914; Liskeard, Cornwall, England
- Died: 2 September 2008 (aged 94); West Wittering, England
- Known for: Headmistress of St Paul's Girls' School

Dame Alison Munro DBE (12 February 1914 – 2 September 2008) was an English civil servant and school headmistress.

== Life and work ==
Munro was born in Liskeard, Cornwall, and brought up in South Africa by her father, John Donald, a doctor, and her mother, a concert pianist. The family moved to South Africa for her father's health, but he died 7 October 1927, shortly after his wife, Helen Barrow Donald (nee Wilson) who died 7 December 1926.

The four surviving children were left money and trustees to look after them. Munro's brother was physician Ian Donald, a pioneer of medical and obstetric ultrasound. In England, she went to St Hilda's College, Oxford, initially to study mathematics, but she switched subjects and graduated with a first degree in Philosophy, Politics and Economics. In 1939, she married a pilot in the Royal Air Force, Ian Munro, but he was killed in 1943 while serving in 266 Squadron and she was left a widow with a child. She went on to work in the Air Ministry, first working for Robert Watson-Watt, who helped develop radar. She rose through the ranks until she was an under-secretary.

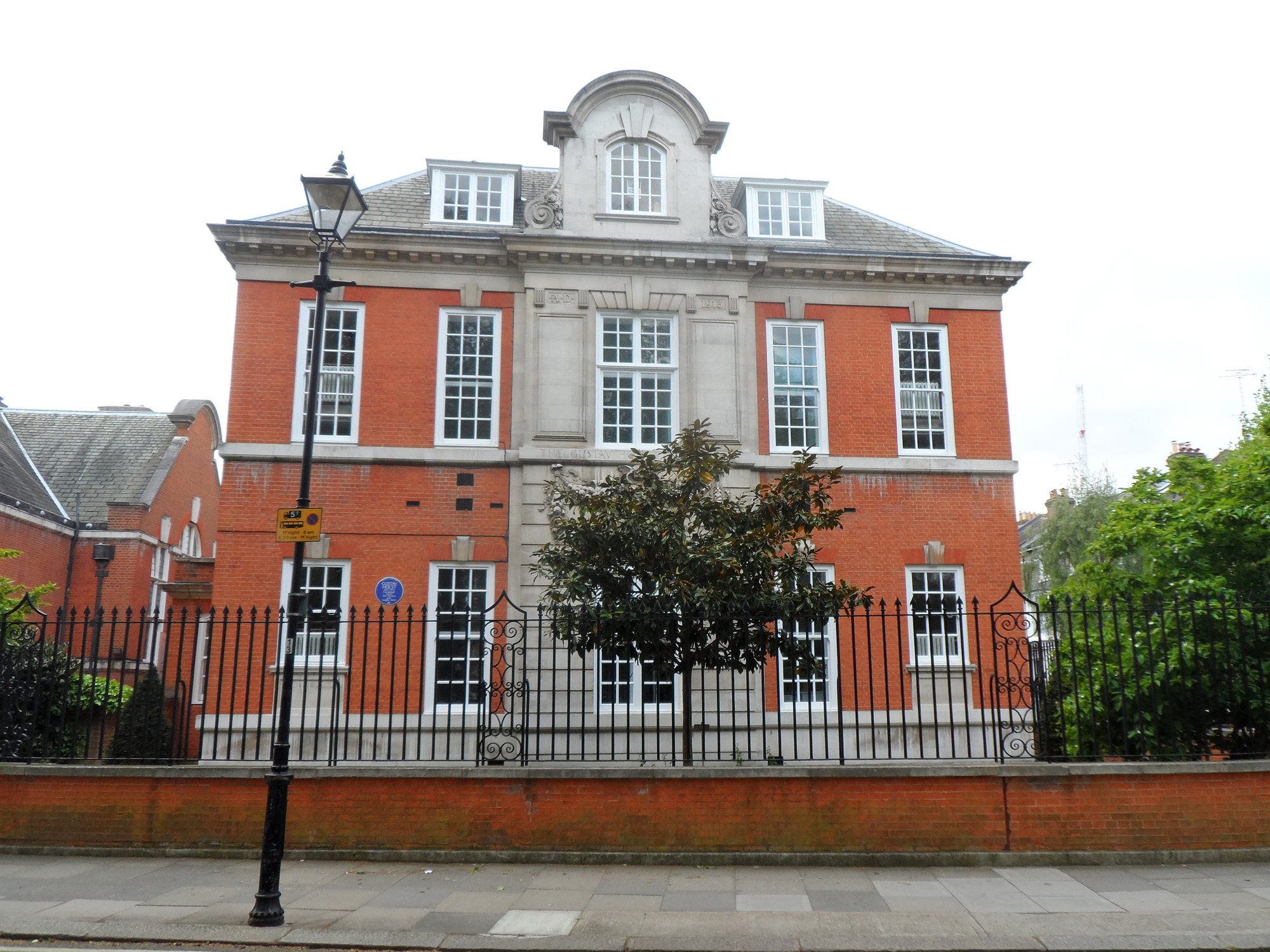
St Paul's Girls' School in Brook Green, London W6

In 1964 she left her civil service career to serve at St Paul's Girls' School as High Mistress, the school that she attended when she first returned to England as a child. The governors decided to take a risk on Munro, given reassurance by her predecessor.

Munro was a formidable woman, and it has been said she never corrected the rumour that she was head hunted. Other sources say that she was indeed head hunted. Munro abolished the school uniform at the school, feeling that the girls were devoting too much energy to defying school uniform requirements; however, the girls then redirected their energy to appearing in fashionable clothes.

Following her departure from the school in 1974, she left education and spent many years leading two health authorities and government enquiries.

Munro died in West Wittering in 2008; she was survived by her son Alan.
