= John MacVicar =

British physician

- John MacVicar just before his death.
- Born: 6 November 1927; Southend, Argyll and Bute, Scotland, UK
- Died: 23 March 2011; Leicester, England, UK
- Citizenship: British
- Known for: Developing obstetric ultrasound, conducting clinical trials using the new techniques.
- Scientific career
- Fields: obstetrics, Medical Ultrasound
- Workplaces: Western Infirmary, University of Glasgow, University of Leicester

John MacVicar FRFPSGlas FRCOG (6 November 1927 – 23 March 2011) was a British physician who was most notable for pioneering the diagnostic use of ultrasound in obstetrics as well as later, being a clinical educator. MacVicar was part of a team along with physician Ian Donald and engineer Tom Brown, who developed the worlds first obstetric ultrasound machine in 1963. Using the new technique of ultrasound, MacVicar's research transformed the treatment of gynaecological conditions in pregnant women, through the use of clinical trials.

== Life ==
John MacVicar was the youngest of six children. His father, Angus John MacVicar, was a Presbyterian minister in the Church of Scotland. His brother was the prolific author Angus MacVicar. MacVicar took his early education at Campbeltown Grammar School and graduated as Dux. In 1945, MacVicar matriculated at the University of Glasgow Medical School to study for a medical degree. After being encouraged by his peers, he decided to specialise in the fields of obstetrics and gynaecology, achieving a Bachelor of Medicine, Bachelor of Surgery in 1950. After a number of junior positions, MacVicar spent 2 years abroad in Singapore for his National service working as a medical officer for the wives of serviceman. When he returned, he was appointed to a position at Stobhill Hospital, which enabled him to complete his membership exam for the Royal College of Obstetricians and Gynaecologists. In 1956, MacVicar was appointed as a Registrar in the Department of Obstetrics and Gynaecology at the Western Infirmary and Royal Maternity Hospital in Glasgow. In 1965, he was appointed a lecturer at Department of Midwifery at Queen Mother's Hospital in Glasgow. While he was there, he took the opportunity of being seconded to the Department of Medicine at the University of East Africa in Nairobi. His remit was to establish a new department that specialised in Obstetrics and Gynaecology. To build the department, he quickly gained a rapport with the staff and established strong links with the Kampala University and universities in Uganda. He was recognised for both his work at the Western Infirmary and in Africa with a promotion to Professor, becoming foundation professor in Leicester Medical School, at the time the newest in the UK. He remained in that position, until his retirement in 1992.

MacVicar was married to Esme MacVicar. He had four children, Marsali, Rona, Alan and Cath, and five grandchildren Sam, Emily, Ailie, Kirsty and Cameron.

== Research ==
The relationship between Brown and MacVicar was mutually supportive. MacVicar had little experience of pure research as his background was in clinical work. However, he recognized the value of diagnostic ultrasound and believed it would play a significant role in obstetrics and gynaecology.

== Bibliography ==
- MacVicar, John; Donald, Ian (June 1963). "Sonar in the Diagnosis of Early Pregnancy and ITS Complications". BJOG: An International Journal of Obstetrics and Gynaecology. 70 (3): 387–395. doi:10.1111/j.1471-0528.1963.tb04920.x. S2CID 72553993.
- Donald, Ian; MacVicar, J; Brown, T.G (June 1958). "Investigation of Abdominal Masses by Pulsed Ultrasound". The Lancet. 271 (7032): 1188–1195. doi:10.1016/S0140-6736(58)91905-6. PMID 13550965.
