= Patrick Cumin =

Scottish senior clergyman (1695-1776)

Patrick Cumin or Cuming (1695–1776) was a senior clergyman in the Church of Scotland. He was three times Moderator of the General Assembly.

== Life ==
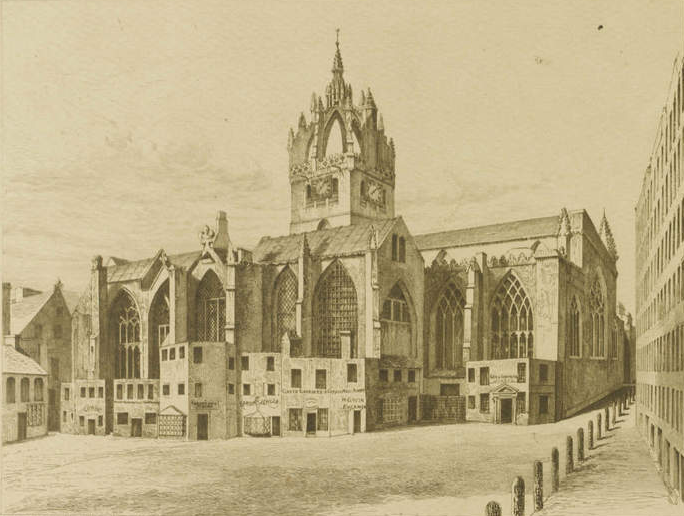
St Giles in the 17th century

He was born in 1695 the eldest son of Robert Cumin of Relugas near Forres, Morayshire. He studied at the University of Edinburgh graduating with an MA in May 1716.

He became personal chaplain to Lord Chief Justice Grange from 1717 to 1720. He was licensed to preach as a minister of the Church of Scotland by the Presbytery of Dalkeith and ordained as minister of Kirkmahoe in August 1720. He translated to Lochmaben in March 1725.

In January 1732 he moved to Edinburgh as second charge of Old Kirk, St Giles and in the summer of 1737 was appointed Professor of Church History at Edinburgh University a post he held until 1762.

He served as Moderator of the General Assembly of the Church of Scotland three times: 1749, 1752 and 1756. He was leader of the Moderate Party in the Church of Scotland and was consulted on the issue of church patronage.

He died on 1 April 1776. His position in St Giles was filled by Robert Henry.

== Family ==
In 1732 he married Jean Lauder (d.1769) daughter of David Lauder of Huntlywood, an advocate (and son of John Lauder, Lord Fountainhall).

Their children included:

- Robert Cumming, who succeeded Patrick as Professor of Church History in 1762 and continued to 1788
- John Cumming (b.1738)
- Patrick Cumming (1741-1820), Professor of Oriental Languages at Glasgow University
- George Cumming of Relugas WS (1746-1804)
- Thomas Cumming (1749-1776) became a surgeon and died in India
- Jean Cumming (1753-1775)

His granddaughter married Sir Thomas Dick Lauder baronet.

== Publications ==
- The Flight of the Timorous Clergyman
