= George Wyllie =

Scottish sculptor

George Wyllie MBE
- George Wyllie - August 2006
- Born: 31 December 1921; Shettleston, Glasgow, Scotland
- Died: 15 May 2012 (aged 90); Inverclyde
- Resting place: Greenock Crematorium; 55.948275°N 4.776916°W
- Known for: Sculpture
- Notable work: Straw Locomotive, Paper Boat
- Spouse: Daphne Watts (m. 1944–2004)
- Awards: MBE; 2005 Services to the Arts
- Website: georgewyllie.com

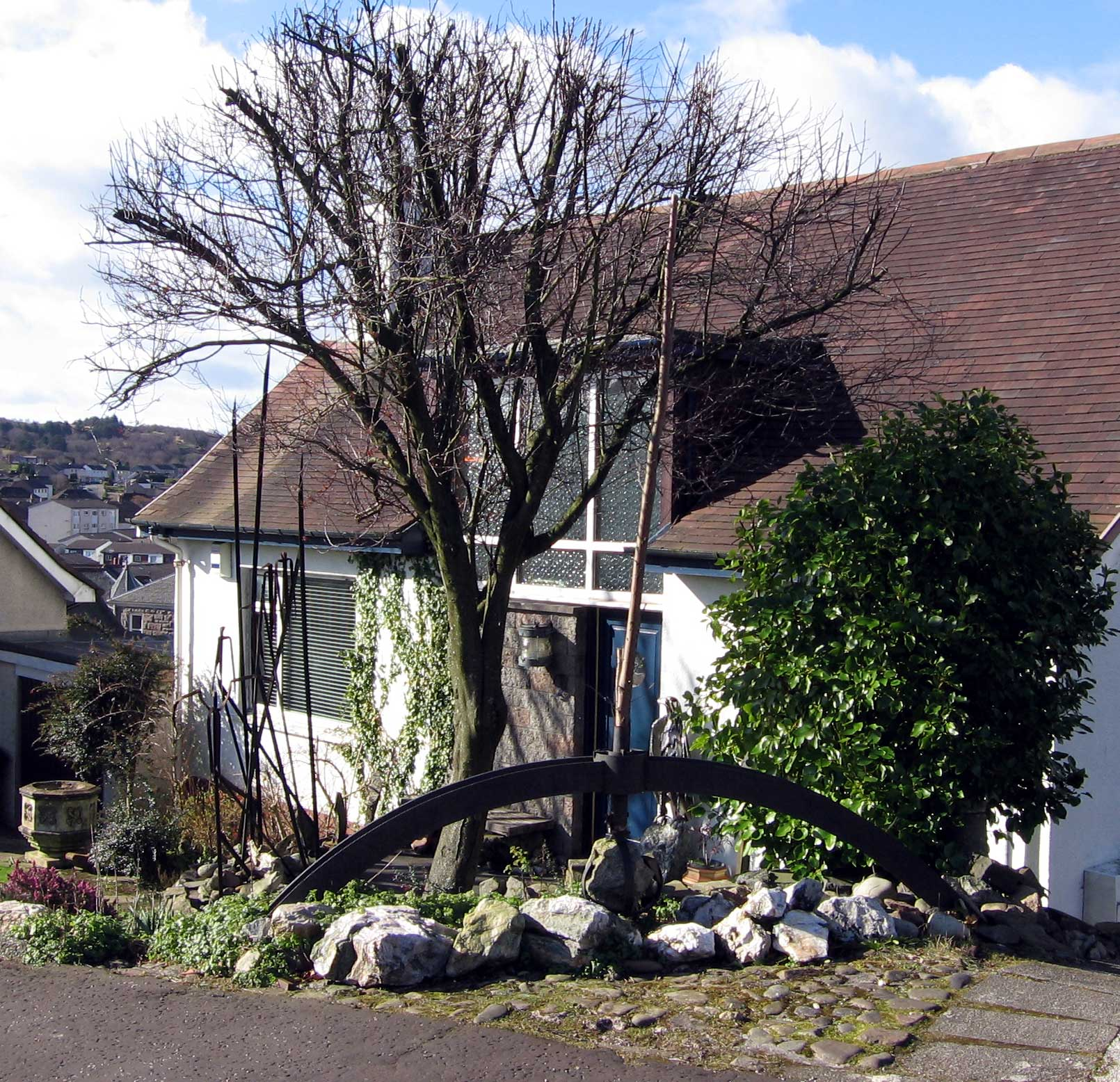
Scul?tures in the garden of George Wyllie

George Ralston Wyllie MBE (31 December 1921 – 15 May 2012) was a Scottish artist. Wyllie produced a number of notable public works, such as the Straw Locomotive and the Paper Boat.

== Life ==
Wyllie was born in Shettleston, in the east end of Glasgow, and grew up in Craigton, in the south-west of the city. He was educated at Bellahouston Academy and Allan Glen's School. He later resided in Gourock. He worked as a customs officer before taking up art. He described himself as a "scul?tor".

Wyllie's Straw Locomotive consisted of a full size steam locomotive, constructed from straw, and suspended from the Finnieston Crane, by the River Clyde in Glasgow. The sculpture was built at the former locomotive works at Springburn, and suspended from the crane for several months during 1987, before being taken back to the Springburn site and ceremonially burnt. The 80-foot Paper Boat was exhibited at The Tramway in Glasgow and at other sites including a placement on the Hudson River in New York, for which visit it carried quotations from Adam Smith's The Theory of Moral Sentiments.

Wyllie's Slap and Tickle Machine is in the collection of the People's Palace, Glasgow, and wind-up stainless steel palm trees and a sculptural bandstand featured in the café of the Kelvingrove Art Gallery and Museum in Glasgow.

George Wyllie was commissioned in the 1970s to build some French influenced sculptures including General Charles de Gaulle, one of the Eiffel Tower and smaller mustachioed & beret wearing French visages (used as coat hooks) that were dotted around the city's first wine bar, "La Bonne Auberge", in its original site (the basement of the now defunct Beacons Hotel at 7 Park Terrace).

The following year Wyllie contributed a golden eagle made from old car bumpers which adorned the wall of Harvey's Diner (it took six men to lift and secure it), and two stainless steel palm trees in Harvey's Cocktail Bar at 8 Park Terrace. A gramophone with an oversize fiberglass megaphone was also sited in the bar at Harvey's but is now on display (alongside the Tour d' Eiffel) in La Bonne Auberge located within the Holiday Inn, in Glasgow's theatreland district.

One of Wyllie's most famous creations, Charlie Parker & His Band, could be seen within Charlie Parker's Bar in Royal Exchange Square in the 1970s and 1980s; the set was up for sale and was meant to have been on display in a jazz museum.

Wyllie's work also include the Clyde Clock (depicting a clock on running legs), outside Buchanan bus station and in the Monument to Maternity (depicting a huge nappy pin), on the site of the former Rottenrow Maternity Hospital. His work resides in the collections of Glasgow Corporation Museum of Transport, Cheshire County Council, Glasgow Cathedral, St. John's Kirk, Perth, St. Mary's Hospital, Lanark, Mitchell Limited, Greenock, and other public and private collections at home, the USA and Sweden.

Wyllie stood as a list candidate (Scottish Senior Citizens Unity Party) for the West of Scotland region in the 2007 Scottish Parliamentary Election.

Wyllie was a president of the Society of Scottish Artists, and provided an award 'for an imaginative work' at their annual exhibition.

In 2005, Wyllie was awarded the MBE in the New Years Honours List.

== Legacy ==
A biography of Wyllie, Arrivals and Sailings: The Making of George Wyllie, co-written by his daughter Louise Wyllie and arts journalist Jan Patience, was published in 2016.

The Wyllieum, a museum dedicated to George Wyllie, opened in Greenock in 2024.

== Selected works ==
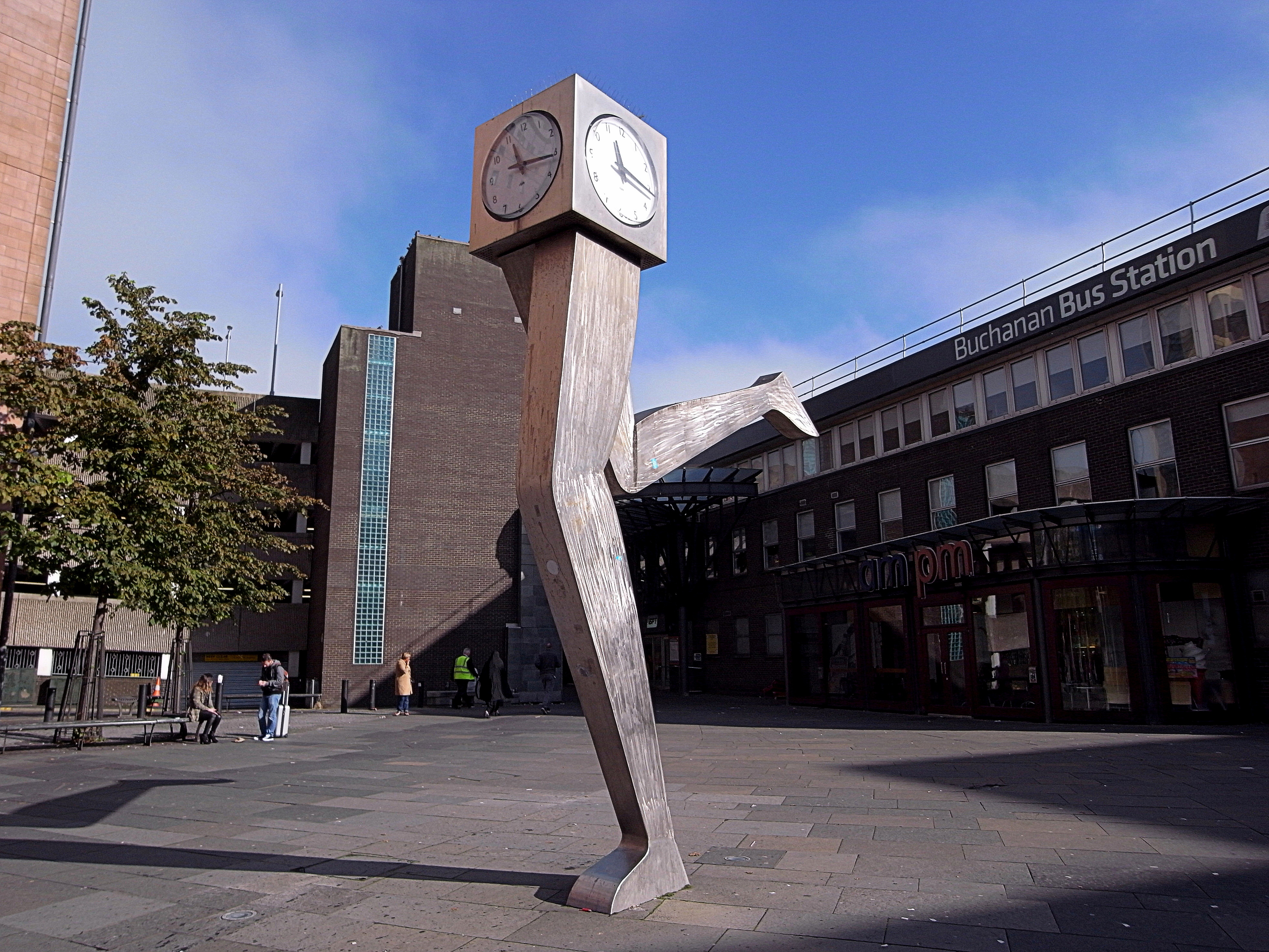
Glasgow. The Clyde Clock (1999-2000). Killermont Street.

- The Paper Boat
- Straw Locomotive
- The World is Small
- The Happy Compass
- Clyde Clock
- Slap and Tickle Machine
- Monument to Maternity
- New Broom
- Life Cycle
- Berlin Bird

== Publications and films ==
- The Cosmic Voyage
- A Day Down a Goldmine
- The Whys?man - In Pursuit of the Question Mark - by Murray Grigor & George Wyllie: San Francisco Film Festival
- Some Serious, Some Not, Some Not Even That (Collected Poems & Illustrations 1979-2010), Media Matters, 2012.
