= Sonicaid =

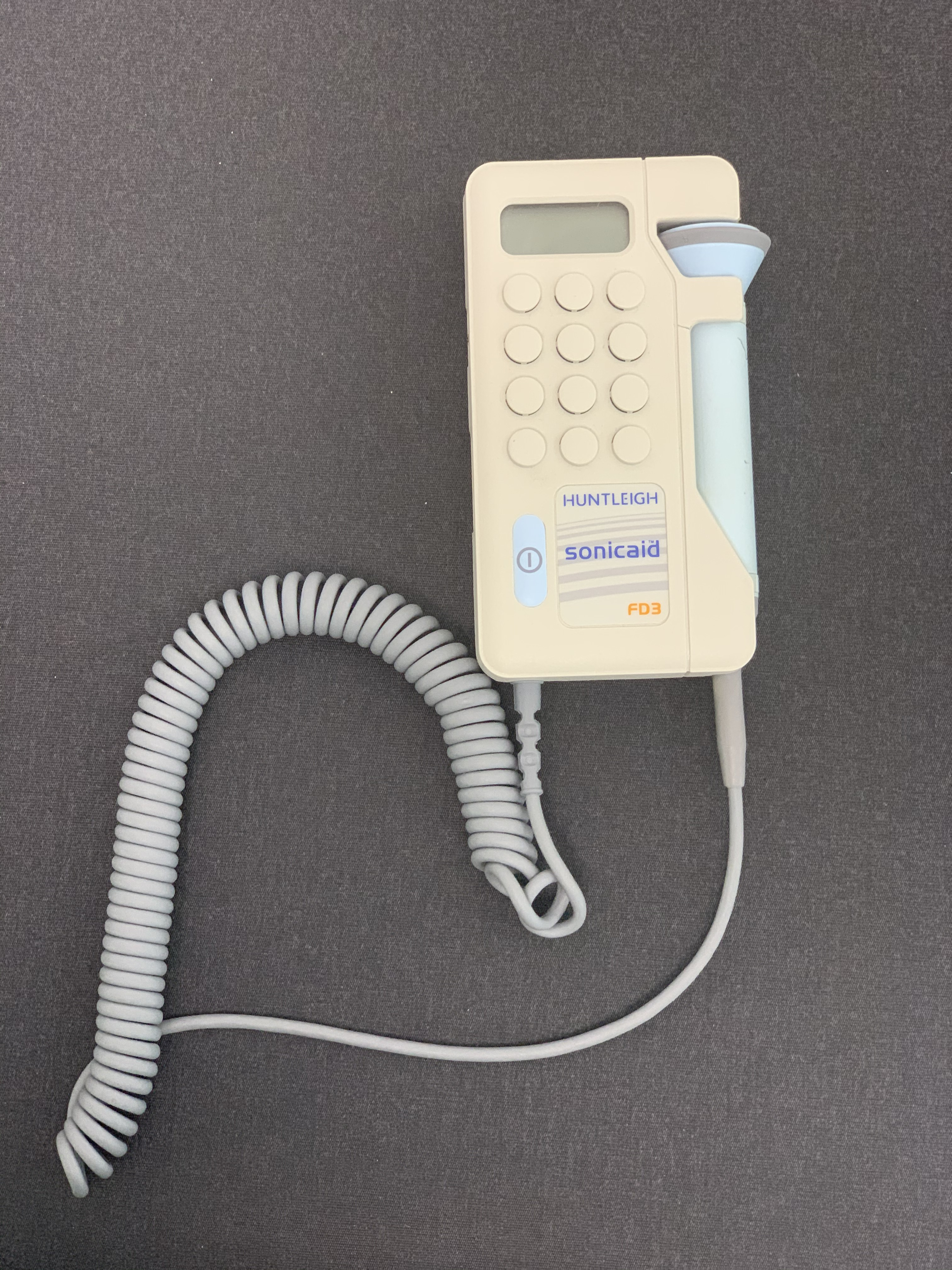
Photo of a genuine Sonicaid®

Sonicaid Ltd was a medical electronics company headquartered in West Sussex best known for its range of Doppler fetal monitors. The company also developed early ultrasound scanners. The word "Sonicaid" is in generic use for Doppler fetal monitors. Sonicaid is now a registered trademark of Huntleigh Healthcare.

== Fetal monitors ==
Sonicaid developed a range of fetal monitors, notably the portable Doppler ultrasound products D102, D104 ("Pocket Sonicaid", winner of a Design Council Award for medical equipment in 1976), D205 and D206 which provided audible output of fetal heart sounds. The original design was due to Frederick (Doug) Fielder who was Sonicaid's medical research director.

The FM series products used both ultrasound and ECG to provide continuous monitoring (recorded on paper charts), enabling clinical interpretation of changes in fetal heart rate during contractions. The FM3R received U.S. Food and Drug Administration (FDA) approval in 1977 and one of these instruments is displayed at the Science Museum, London (the "machine that goes ping" in The Meaning of Life is identifiable as this model).

== Ultrasound scanners ==
Sonicaid Ltd was involved in an early venture in the development of a 3D multiplanar scanner in the mid-1970s, building on the pioneering obstetric ultrasonography work by Prof Ian Donald and colleagues. They also developed the Sonicaid RTS5200 Real Time Scanner which was used in hospitals for obstetric applications.

== Company history ==
Sonicaid Ltd was based in Bognor Regis in the 1970s with a unit in Livingston, Scotland, and in Chichester in the 1980s. The company was acquired in 1987 by Oxford Instruments and developed the product range further as "Oxford Sonicaid".
