= Jan Patience =

Scottish journalist and author

- Occupations: Journalist, author, broadcaster, communications specialist
- Years active: 1990s–present
- Notable work: Arrivals and Sailings: The Making of George Wyllie (2016)

Jan Patience is a Scottish arts journalist, author, and broadcaster. She is a long-standing arts columnist for The Sunday Post and previously wrote on visual art for The Herald. She is the co-author, with Louise Wyllie, of Arrivals and Sailings: The Making of George Wyllie (2016), a biography of the Scottish artist George Wyllie.

== Career ==
=== Journalism ===
Patience has worked as a journalist and editor for more than 30 years, contributing to a range of publications including The Times, the Sunday Times, The Herald, the Daily Record, The National, The Sunday Post and Homes & Interiors Scotland. She was previously editor of the Daily Record Saturday magazine, which won Magazine of the Year at the Scottish Press Awards during her tenure.

=== Broadcasting ===
Patience appears regularly as an arts commentator on radio and television, including BBC Radio Scotland, BBC Radio 4's Front Row,BBC Scotland and STV.

== Bibliography ==
- Arrivals and Sailings: The Making of George Wyllie (with Louise Wyllie), Polygon/Birlinn, 2016. ISBN 978-1-84697-306-2.

== Memberships and affiliations ==
- Founding member and former co-chair (2019–2021) of Women in Journalism Scotland.
- Former chair of the Friends of George Wyllie.
