= Thomas Snow Beck =

British doctor and surgeon

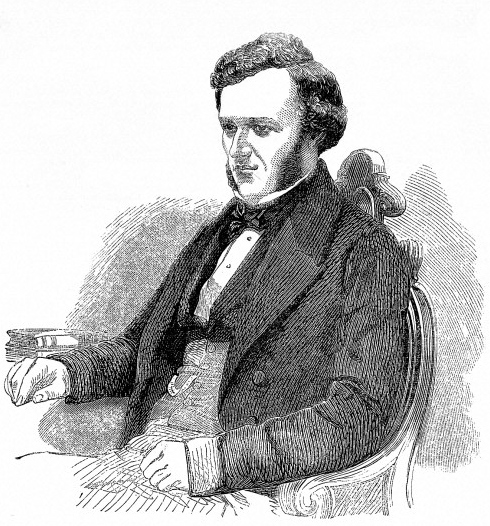
Thomas Snow Beck c. 1852

Thomas Snow Beck FRS FRCS (1814 – 6 January 1877) was a British doctor and surgeon. He qualified as a doctor in London. In 1845, he was awarded the Royal Society's Royal Medal for his unpublished paper entitled On the nerves of the uterus. The paper was later published, but the award was disputed by the London-resident Scottish surgeon Robert Lee, who had published an earlier paper on the subject and reached different conclusions. This controversy led to reform of the award process for the Royal Medal, and is thought to have contributed to the resignation of both the President and Secretary of the Royal Society. Beck also carried out other work on nerves, including work in 1846 on differentiation between white and gray rami. He was elected a fellow of the Royal Society in 1851.

== Sources ==
- Entry for Beck in the Royal Society's Library and Archive catalogue's details of Fellows (accessed 21 April 2008)
- Haws, C; Krouse, M. E.; Xia, Y; Gruenert, D. C.; Wine, J. J. (1992). "CFTR channels in immortalized human airway cells". The American Journal of Physiology. 263 (6 Pt 1): L692–707. doi:10.1152/ajplung.1992.263.6.L692. PMID 1282304.
