= Patrick Cumming =

Patrick Cumming (or Patrick Cumin) FRSE (1741 – 1820) was a professor of Oriental Languages at the University of Glasgow, philologist and joint founder of the Royal Society of Edinburgh. He was, at that time, the longest served of any known Scottish professor.

His father has the same name.

== Life ==
He was born in Edinburgh on 11 October 1741 the son of Rev Prof Patrick Cumin, Professor of Church History at the University of Edinburgh and three times Moderator of the Church of Scotland. He went to the University of Edinburgh and graduated with an MA in 1760.

In 1761 he became a professor at the University of Glasgow and held this title until death on 27 October 1820. This period of 59 years as a professor is believed to be the longest such tenure in Scottish history.

In 1783 he was a co-founder of the Royal Society of Edinburgh.

He died on 27 October 1820 in Glasgow.
