= James Towers (obstetrician) =

Scottish obstetrician

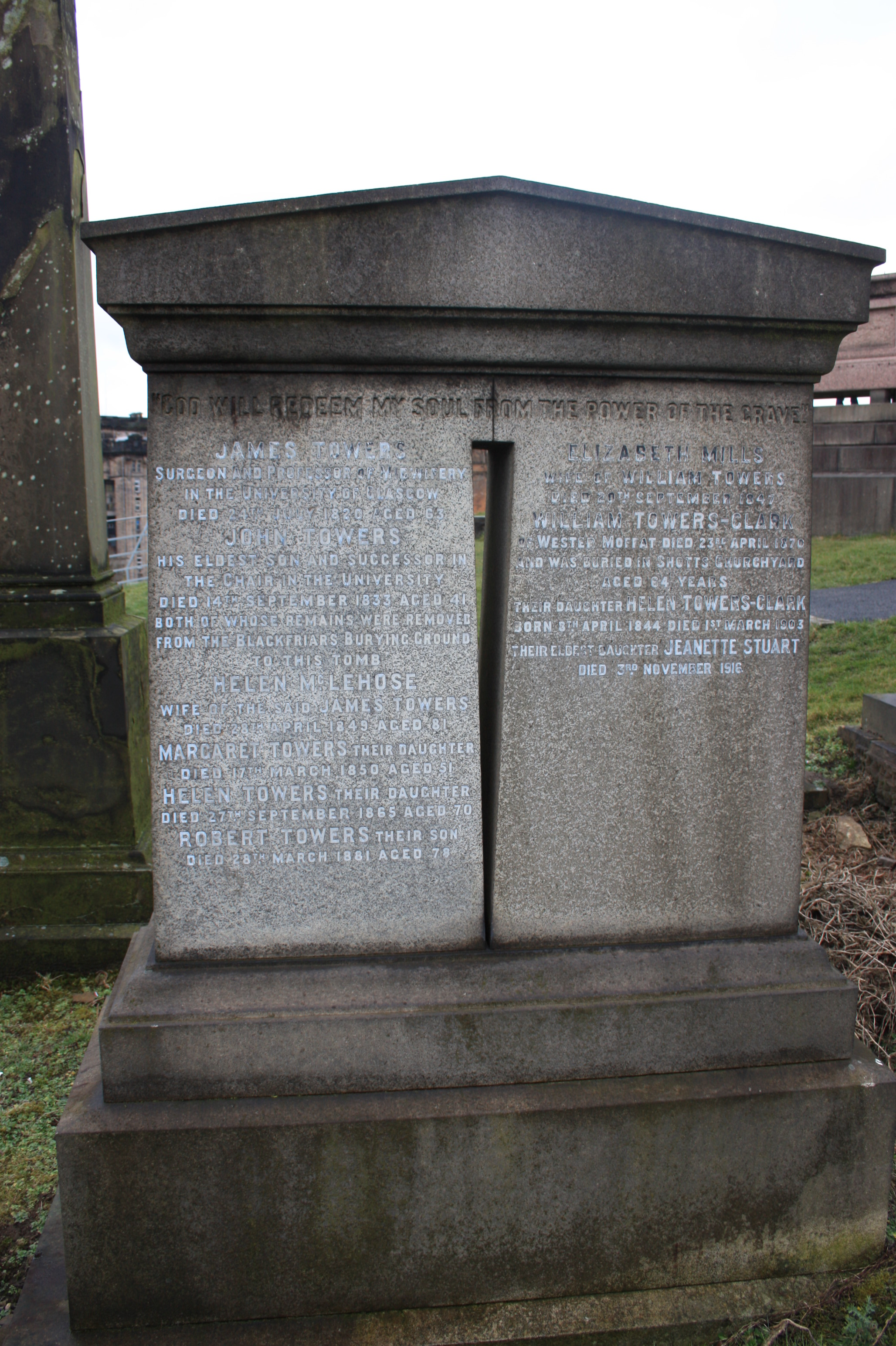
The grave of James Towers, Glasgow Necropolis

James Towers or Touris (1757–1820) was a Scottish obstetrician. He was the first occupant of the Regius Professor of Obstetrics and Gynaecology at the University of Glasgow. He was a Tory.

== Life ==
He was born in 1757 at Quoigs Farm near Dunblane. He studied medicine at the University of Edinburgh, graduating around 1777.

An eminent surgeon, he did his practical training in obstetrics at Edinburgh Royal Infirmary, and also in London. In 1790, Towers requested to lecture on obstetrics at the University of Glasgow, the first such appointment, and he was also appointed the first professor of midwifery in 1815.

He died at home, 56 Ingram Street in central Glasgow on 24 July 1820, aged 63.

Both John and James Towers were originally buried at Blackfriars Churchyard but both were reinterred in Glasgow Necropolis in the mid-19th century when the churchyard was redeveloped.

== Family ==
Towers married Helen McLehose (also called Helen Hozier) in Glasgow in 1790. They were parents to William Towers-Clark (1805–1870), a lawyer and dean of the Faculty of Procurators, and to John Towers (1791–1833), who succeeded James as the second occupant of the chair of midwifery at the university.
