= Rottenrow =

Street in Glasgow, Scotland

Coordinates: 55.86232°N 4.24397°W

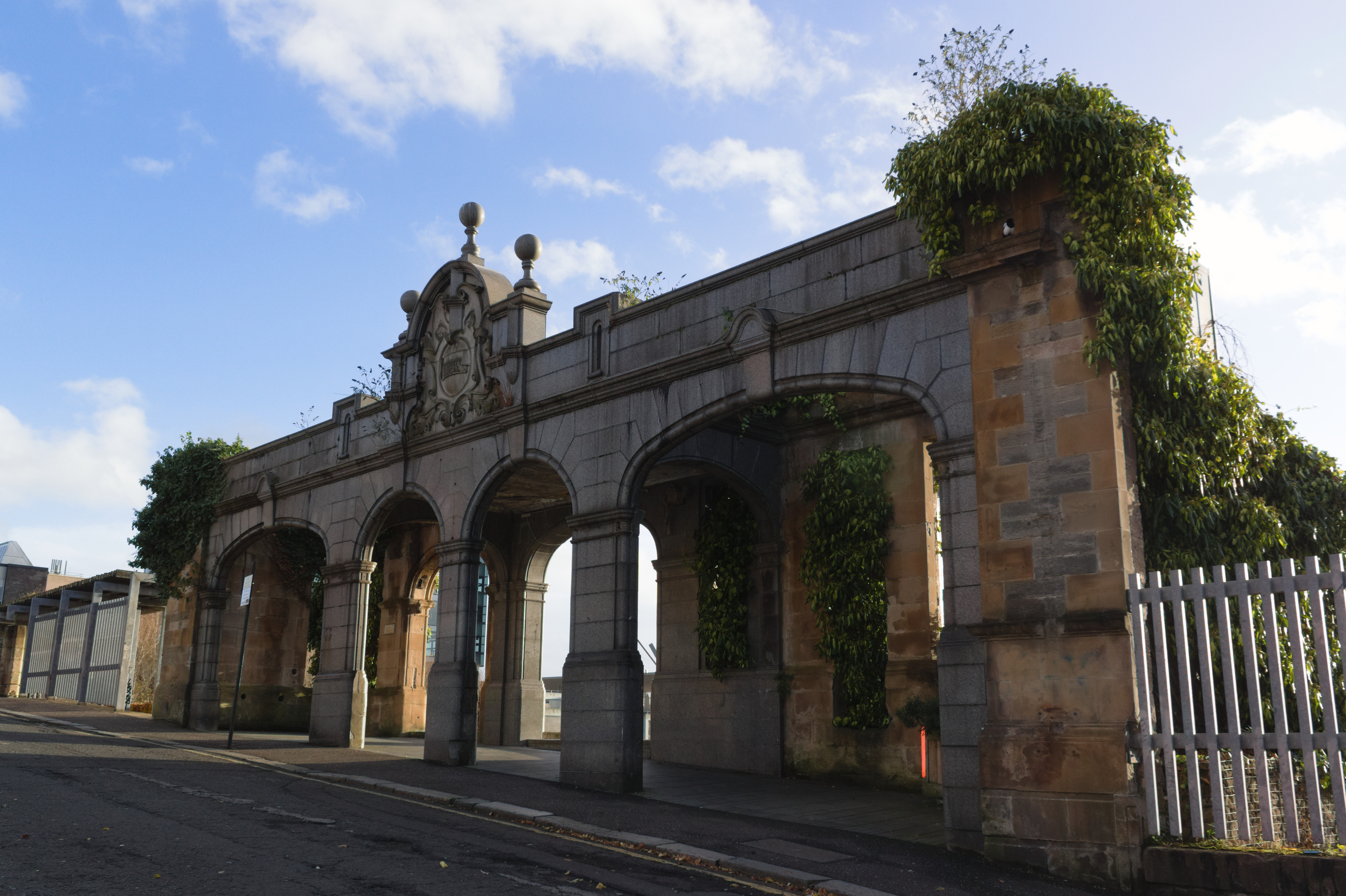
The Rottenrow entrance to the old Royal Maternity Hospital, demolished in 2002

The Rottenrow is a street in the Townhead district of Glasgow, Scotland. One of the oldest streets in the city, it underwent heavy redevelopment in the 20th century and now forms part of the University of Strathclyde's John Anderson Campus. The street runs along the summit of a drumlin known historically as Balmano Brae, although this name has long fallen from use.

== History ==
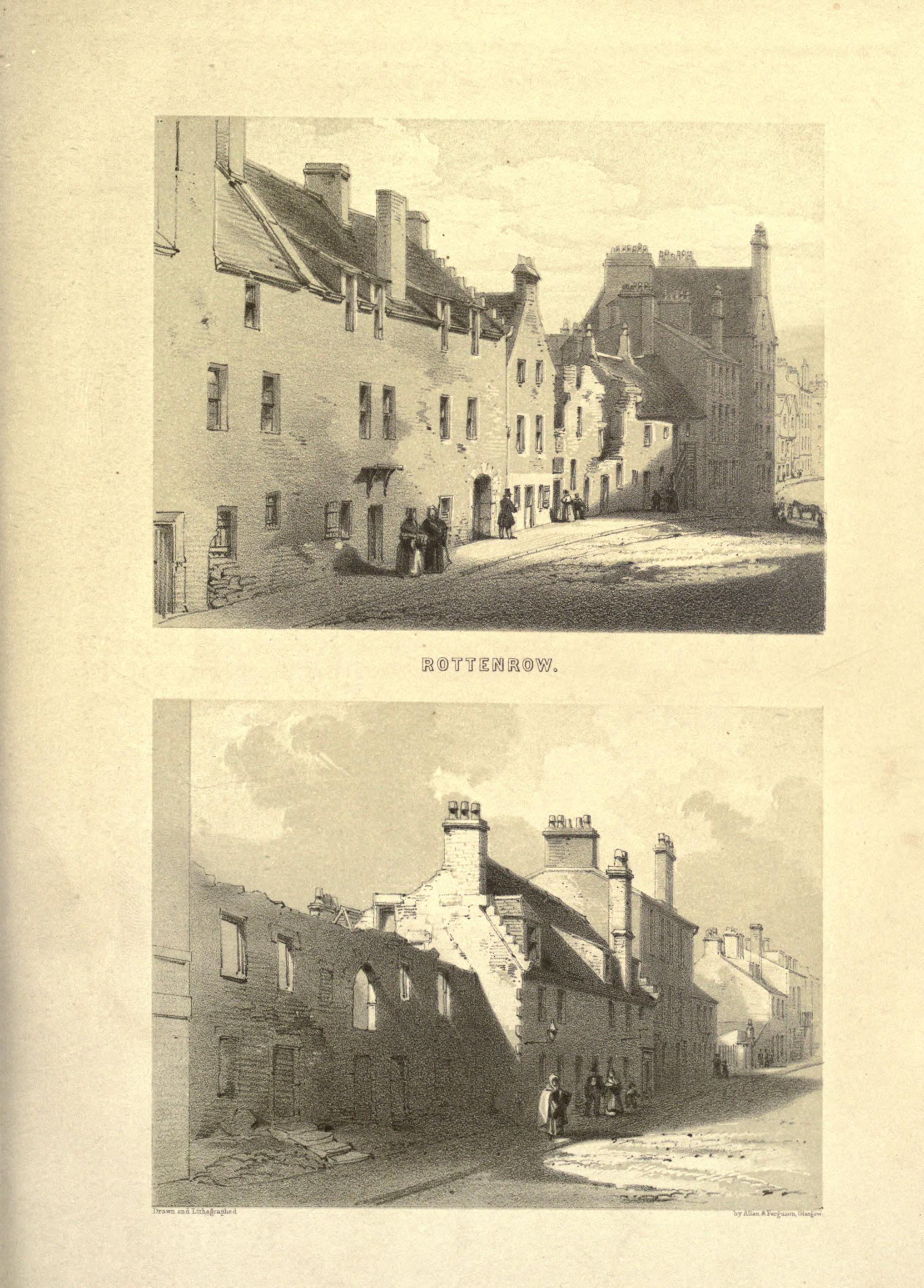
The Rottenrow as it looked in the Victorian era, from Views and Notices of Glasgow in Former Times (1848)

The Rottenrow is one of eight streets which formed the medieval burgh of Glasgow. It was recorded as le Ratonraw de Glasgw in 1283. The name was once a common one in British towns and cities and literally means "rat row" (from Middle English ratton raw), suggesting a tumbledown row of houses infested with rats. The original alignment of Rottenrow stretched from High Street at its east to John Street in the west.

The original premises of the University of Glasgow were situated in the Rottenrow, in a building known as the "Auld Pedagogy".

Townhead was once a densely populated residential area, but in 1962 the Glasgow Corporation earmarked it for redevelopment as part of its policy of slum clearance. The tenements and other buildings surrounding the Rottenrow were swept away to make room for the new University of Strathclyde, formed in 1964 from the Royal College of Science and Technology, and their inhabitants were moved into high rises. Much of the surrounding street grid was either lost completely or realigned between the new campus buildings. The western section between Montrose and John Streets disappeared after the demolition of John Street Ironworks in the 1950s, the new Engineering Block and Chemistry Block of the Royal College were constructed over this portion in the early 1960s. The western continuation of Rottenrow - a footpath known as Love Loan which ran behind St Paul's Church parallel to Martha Street - also disappeared around this period.

Today, the Rottenrow itself is now divided into two sections. The eastern part which starts at High Street is designated Rottenrow East, and terminates at Taylor Street where it becomes a pedestrian footpath around the Architecture Building and Wolfson Centre. The western section then continues as Rottenrow from North Portland Street to Montrose Street, following the original alignment where it terminates on Montrose Street.

The Rottenrow is perhaps best known as the site of the Royal Maternity Hospital, the birthplace of generations of Glaswegians. Opened in 1860 to replace an older maternity hospital in St Andrew's Square, it continued to function until 2001, when it was replaced by the Princess Royal Building at the Glasgow Royal Infirmary. The University of Strathclyde subsequently purchased and demolished the hospital, turning it into a park, Rottenrow Gardens. A few parts of the building, including the main entrance portico, the arch on North Portland Street, and sections of basement wall were spared destruction. The area's heritage is commemorated by a giant metal nappy pin at the centre of the gardens, created by sculptor George Wyllie.

In 2023, the University of Strathclyde reached an agreement with Glasgow City Council to take full possession of the Rottenrow along with neighbouring North Portland Street and Richmond Street. The land, which carried a nominal value of £50,000 was transferred to the university at no cost. The three streets will be pedestrianised, to allow for the expansion of Rottenrow Gardens and to create an uninterrupted public space for students and staff. A new Love Loan is also being created parallel to its original alignment but further south, between John Street and North Frederick Street in 2024.
