= Robert Lee (obstetrician) =

British obstetrician (1793–1877)

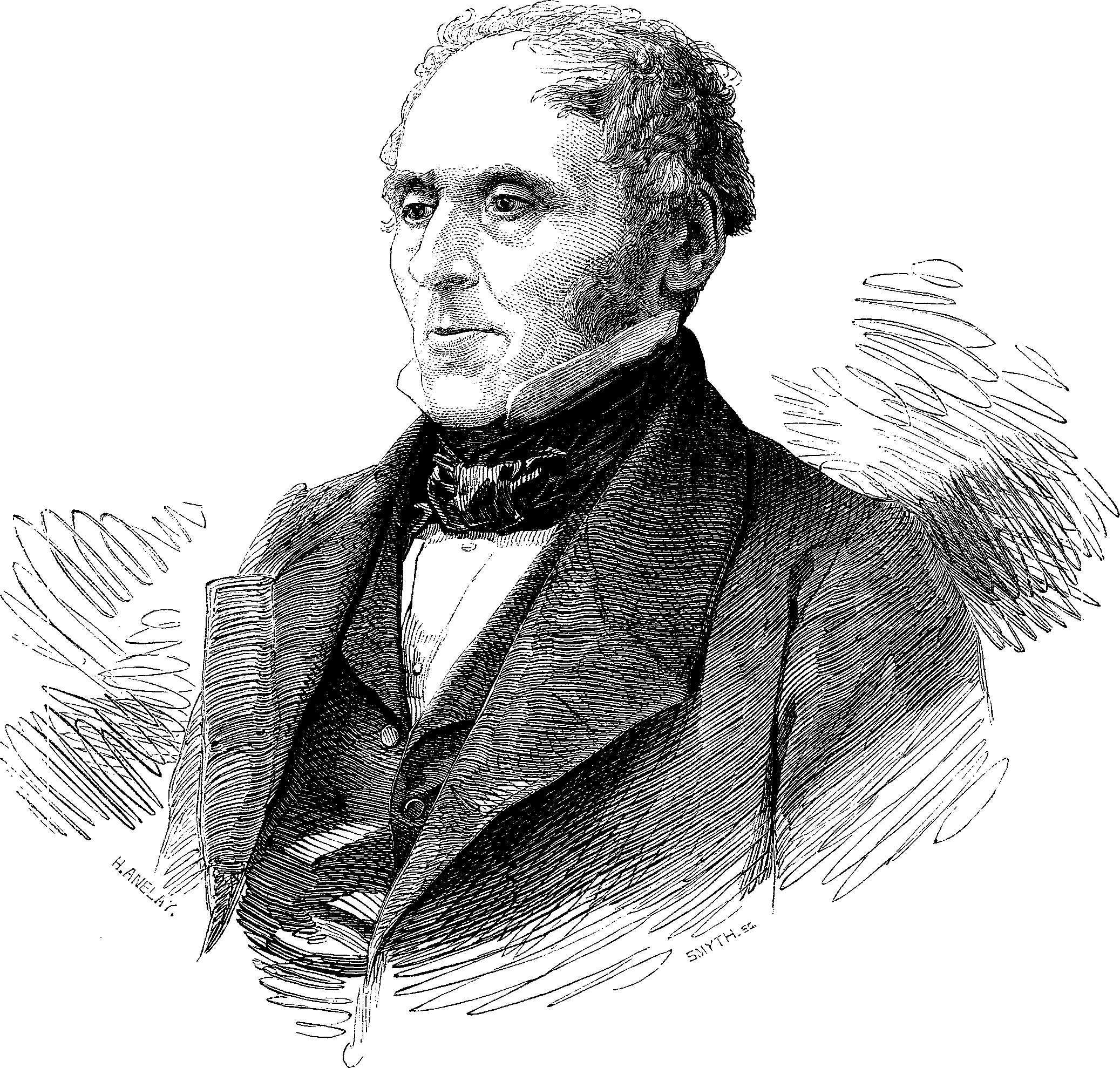
- Sketch of Lee
- Born: 1793; Melrose, Scottish Borders
- Died: 6 February 1877 (age 83/84); Surbiton, Surrey, England
- Resting place: Kensal Green Cemetery, London; 51.5286°N 0.2241°W
- Education: University of Edinburgh
- Occupation: Physician
- Title: MD Edin. (1814); MRCS Edin. (1814); LRCP (1823 ); FRS; FRCS (1841); President of the Western Medical Society (1850)
- Spouse: Emily Auriol
- Children: Two sons
- Parent(s): John Lee (agriculturist); Mother unknown

Robert Lee FRS (1793 – 6 February 1877) was Regius Professor of Midwifery at the University of Glasgow in 1834. He held the Chair for the shortest period of any holder to date, resigning from his position immediately after giving his opening address.

== Early life ==
Lee was born at Melrose, Roxburghshire in 1793, the second son of John Lee, an agriculturist. He was educated at Galashiels, chiefly by the Reverend Robert Balmer, until in 1806, at age thirteen, he went to the University of Edinburgh, from which he graduated MD in 1814. After his graduation he was appointed Physician's Clerk to James Hamilton, Professor of Midwifery at the University of Edinburgh, a position he relinquished in 1817.

== Career ==
In 1824 Lee accepted an appointment as personal physician to Prince Mikhail Semyonovich Vorontsov, Governor-General of the Crimea. Through this office he met Alexander I of Russia in 1825. He described his experiences in Russia in the book The Last Days of Alexander and the First Days of Nicholas, published in 1854. Returning to London in 1827, Lee was appointed in 1830 a Fellow of the Royal Society, an institution with which he maintained a long and acrimonious relationship, particularly over the disputed award of a Royal Medal to Thomas Snow Beck.

Through the offices of William Lamb, 2nd Viscount Melbourne, Lee was appointed Regius Professor of Midwifery at the University of Glasgow in 1834. However, he resigned after his opening speech and returned immediately to London.

Between 1835 and 1866 he was lecturer at St George's Hospital, London, on midwifery and the diseases of women. In 1841 he was elected a Fellow of the Royal College of Physicians. He delivered their Lumleian lectures in 1856, their Croonian Lecture in 1862 and their Harveian oration in 1864, the last time it was delivered in Latin.

== Later life ==
Lee died in London in 1877. He is buried at Kensal Green Cemetery, London.

== Works ==
- Lee, Robert (1842). Clinical midwifery: comprising the histories of five hundred and forty-five cases of difficult, preternatural, and complicated labour. London: John Churchill and Sons.
- Lee, Robert (2010) [1844]. Lectures on the Theory and Practice of Midwifery. General Books LLC. ISBN 978-1-152-99643-4.
- Lee, Robert (1854). The Last Days of Alexander and the First Days of Nicholas. London: The Athenaeum. ISBN 978-0-559-86070-6.
- Lee, Robert (1864). Three Hundred Consultations in Midwifery. London: John Churchill and Sons.
