= John Martin Munro Kerr =

Scottish obstetrician and gynaecologist (1868–1960)

John Martin Munro Kerr (5 December 1868 – 7 October 1960) was Regius Professor of Midwifery at the University of Glasgow from 1927 to 1934. A scholar and surgeon of international acclaim he won both the Katherine Bishop Harman Prize in 1934 for his book Maternal Mortality and Morbidity (1933) and was the first recipient of the Blair Bell Medal for obstetrics and gynaecology.

== Early life ==
J. M. Munro Kerr was born at Kelvingrove Street in Glasgow in 1868 the son of George Munro Kerr (15 November 1836 – 23 June 1907), a Scottish ship-owner from Greenock, and Jessie Elizabeth Martin. His grandfather, John Kerr, had been a West Indian Merchant and ship-owner who married an American-born wife; Mary Clark. J. M. Munro Kerr graduated from the University of Glasgow MB CM in 1890. As a senior undergraduate he was present in 1889 when Murdoch Cameron performed the first series of follow-up Caesarean section operations at the Glasgow Royal Maternity Hospital, carried out after Cameron's famous initial success in 1888.

== Professional career ==
Fluent in German and French, Munro Kerr spent a number of years after his graduation in Germany, Austria and Ireland studying obstetrics and gynaecology at Berlin, Vienna and Dublin. From 1894 he acted as Professorial Assistant to Murdoch Cameron, a position that entailed both academic work at the University of Glasgow and practical experience on the obstetrical and gynaecological wards of Glasgow Royal Maternity Hospital and Glasgow's Western Infirmary.

Appointed Visiting Surgeon at the Maternity Hospital in 1900, he published to great success Operative Midwifery in 1908. The text was originally written as the thesis for his MD at Glasgow. Munro Kerr was elected to the chair of Obstetrics and Gynaecology at Glasgow Anderson College in 1910, and in a rapidly successful career he took the Muirhead chair of Obstetrics and Gynaecology at the University of Glasgow in 1911. His First Assistant at this time was Louise McIlroy.

A Foundation Fellow Royal College of Obstetricians and Gynaecologists in 1929 Munro Kerr was also its first Vice President until 1932. Succeeding Murdoch Cameron on his retirement as Professor of Midwifery at Glasgow, Munro Kerr took the chair in the New Year of 1927 holding the position until his retirement in 1934. Munro Kerr won the Katherine Bishop Harman Prize in 1934 for his widely successful book Maternal Mortality and Morbidity (1933).

During World War II he acted as Medical Superintendent of the Kent and Canterbury Hospital.

== Awards and honours ==
Munro Kerr was made an honorary LLD by Glasgow in 1935. He was the first recipient of the Blair Bell Medal, awarded to him by the Royal Society of Medicine in 1950.

== Retirement ==
Following his retirement he lived in Canterbury, it was there that he died in 1960.

== Bibliography ==
- Kerr, John Martin Munro (1933) Maternal Mortality and Morbidity, Edinburgh, Livingstone.
- Kerr, John Martin Munro (1908) Operative Midwifery, London, Baillière, Tindall and Cox.
- Peel, John (1976) The Lives of the Fellows of the Royal College of Obstetricians and Gynaecologists: 1929-1969, London, Heinemann Medical Books
