= Princess Royal Maternity Hospital =

- NHS Greater Glasgow and Clyde
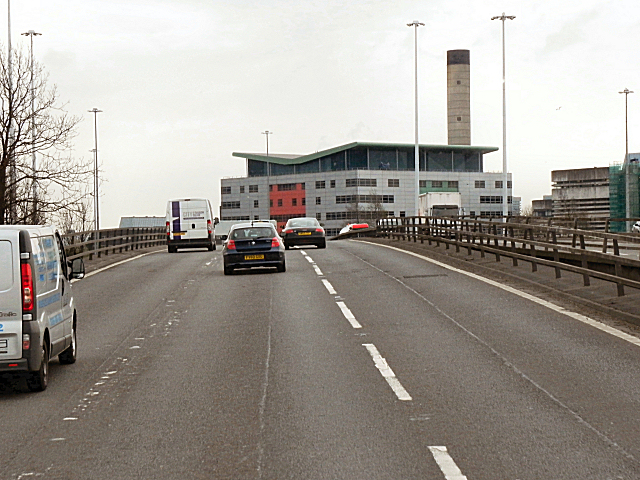
- The new maternity hospital

- Shown in Glasgow

Geography
- Location: Alexandra Parade, Glasgow, Scotland
- Coordinates: 55.8651°N 4.2308°W

Organisation
- Care system: NHS Scotland
- Type: Specialist

Services
- Speciality: Maternity

History
- Founded: 1834

Links
- Website: Princess Royal Maternity Hospital

The Princess Royal Maternity Hospital is a maternity hospital in Glasgow, Scotland. It was founded as the Glasgow Lying-in Hospital and Dispensary in 1834 in Greyfriars Wynd, just off the city's High Street. It moved to St Andrew's Square in 1841, then to Rottenrow in 1860 and to the Glasgow Royal Infirmary site in 2001. It is managed by NHS Greater Glasgow and Clyde.

== History ==
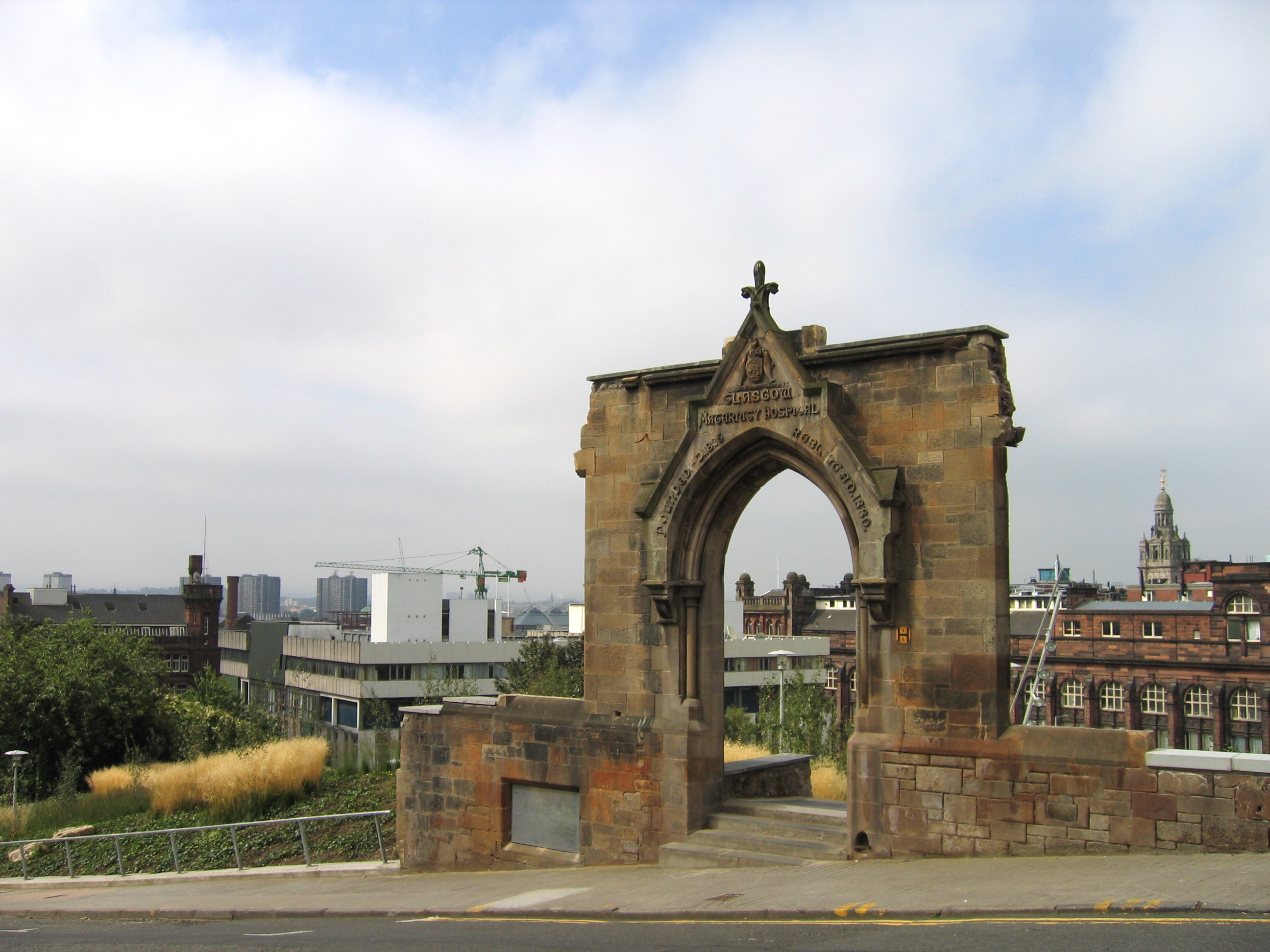
Remains of the demolished Rottenrow building

The hospital was founded in Greyfriars Wynd as the Glasgow Lying-in Hospital and Dispensary in 1834. Lying-in is an archaic term for childbirth (referring to the month-long bedrest prescribed for postpartum confinement). A dispensary was a place to receive medicine; see for context the Dispensary movement in Manchester.

The hospital moved to St Andrew's Square in 1841 and to Rottenrow in 1860. New buildings were erected on the Rottenrow site in 1881.

A West End branch opened in St. Vincent Street in 1888, the same year that Murdoch Cameron performed the world's first modern Caesarean section. An extension was added in 1908 and the title "Glasgow Royal Maternity and Women's Hospital" was granted in 1914. A clinical laboratory opened in 1926 and a nurses' home was opened in 1928.

The West End branch closed in 1941 after it was damaged in an air raid and a new out-patients department opened in 1955. The title "Glasgow Royal Maternity Hospital" was adopted in 1960.

After the old building in Rottenrow had fallen into a state of disrepair, the hospital moved to a new building on the Glasgow Royal Infirmary site in October 2001. The new facility was named the "Princess Royal Maternity Hospital".

Meanwhile, the Rottenrow building was acquired and demolished by the University of Strathclyde. The university re-opened the site as Rottenrow Gardens in October 2003.
