= St Paul's Building, Glasgow =

St Paul's Building
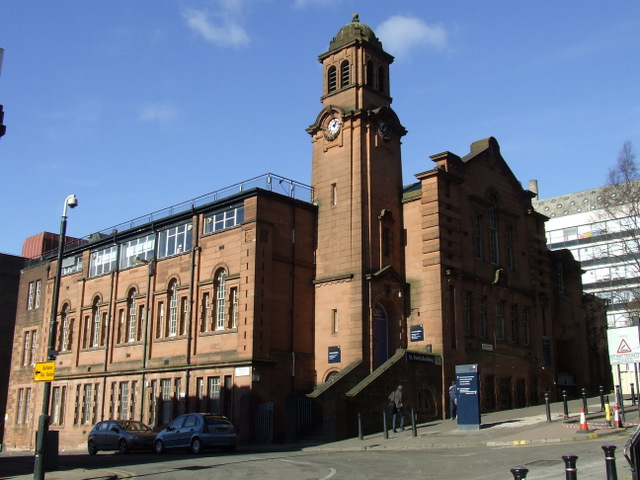
- Southern elevation of St Paul's Church from John Street, with the Central College of Commerce building in the background
- Interactive map of the St Paul's Building area
- Former names: St Paul's (Outer High) Church

General information
- Architectural style: Baroque
- Location: 104 John Street; 2 Martha Street, Glasgow, Scotland
- Coordinates: (55.86235°N 4.24740°W)
- Year built: 1904–1907
- Opened: 1907
- Renovated: 1957–58
- Owner: University of Strathclyde

Design and construction
- Architect: John McIntyre

Renovating team
- Architects: Wyllie, Shanks and Underwood

Listed Building – Category B
- Official name: 101 JOHN STREET AND 4 MARTHA STREET, UNIVERSITY OF STRATHCLYDE CHAPLAINCY CENTRE (FORMER ST PAUL'S CHURCH)
- Designated: 01 September 1998
- Reference no.: LB45641

The St Paul's Building (formerly St Paul's (Outer High) Parish Church), is a deconsecrated church building located at 104 John Street in the Townhead area of Glasgow, Scotland. Originally constructed in 1904, it has been part of the University of Strathclyde (and its predecessor institution the Royal College of Science and Technology) since 1953, when it was converted for use as the Chaplaincy. The building lies on the western edge of the university's John Anderson Campus, close to George Square.

Since 1998, it has been protected as a Category B listed building

== History ==
=== Origin ===
The original St Paul's (Outer High) Parish Church was opened in 1836 on a site on adjacent George Street to house the Outer High congregation that previously had occupied part of Glasgow Cathedral, however, the rapidly expanding Glasgow and West of Scotland Technical College was proposing to construct a new building on the same site which was the location of its founding institution – Anderson's College. The college compensated the Church by purchasing a nearby site at the corner of Martha Street and John Street for £5000, with a further £10000 contribution towards the construction of a replacement. An architectural competition was launched in 1904 to design the new church, which was won by the Edinburgh-based architect John McIntyre. The new church was completed in 1907.

=== Post-war (1953–2018) ===
With the church's nearby congregation rapidly dwindling as a result of the Royal College's relentless expansion as well as slum clearances in Townhead as a whole – multiple properties on John Street and nearby Montrose Street had already been given over to the college in the 1930s by Glasgow Corporation, the church's remaining congregation merged with nearby St David's Ramshorn Church on Ingram Street, and the Royal College purchased the building in 1953 with a view to converting it into a multi-denominational Chaplaincy Centre and to provide a hub for other student welfare services. Alterations and extensions were built in 1957–58, designed by the local architectural firm Wylie, Shanks and Underwood, who were responsible for many of the new educational buildings being constructed in the area at the time.

Following the Royal College's elevation to university status in 1964 to become the University of Strathclyde, the St Paul's Building (as it was now known), continued its function as the Chaplaincy Centre for many decades afterwards (the university employed two full-time Chaplains – both Church of Scotland and Roman Catholic), as well as providing accommodation for parts of the Student's Union which could not be accommodated in the adjacent 90 John Street building – these were housed in a separate section of the building known as "The Annexe", which was accessed from the 4 Martha Street entrance.

=== Present (2018–) ===
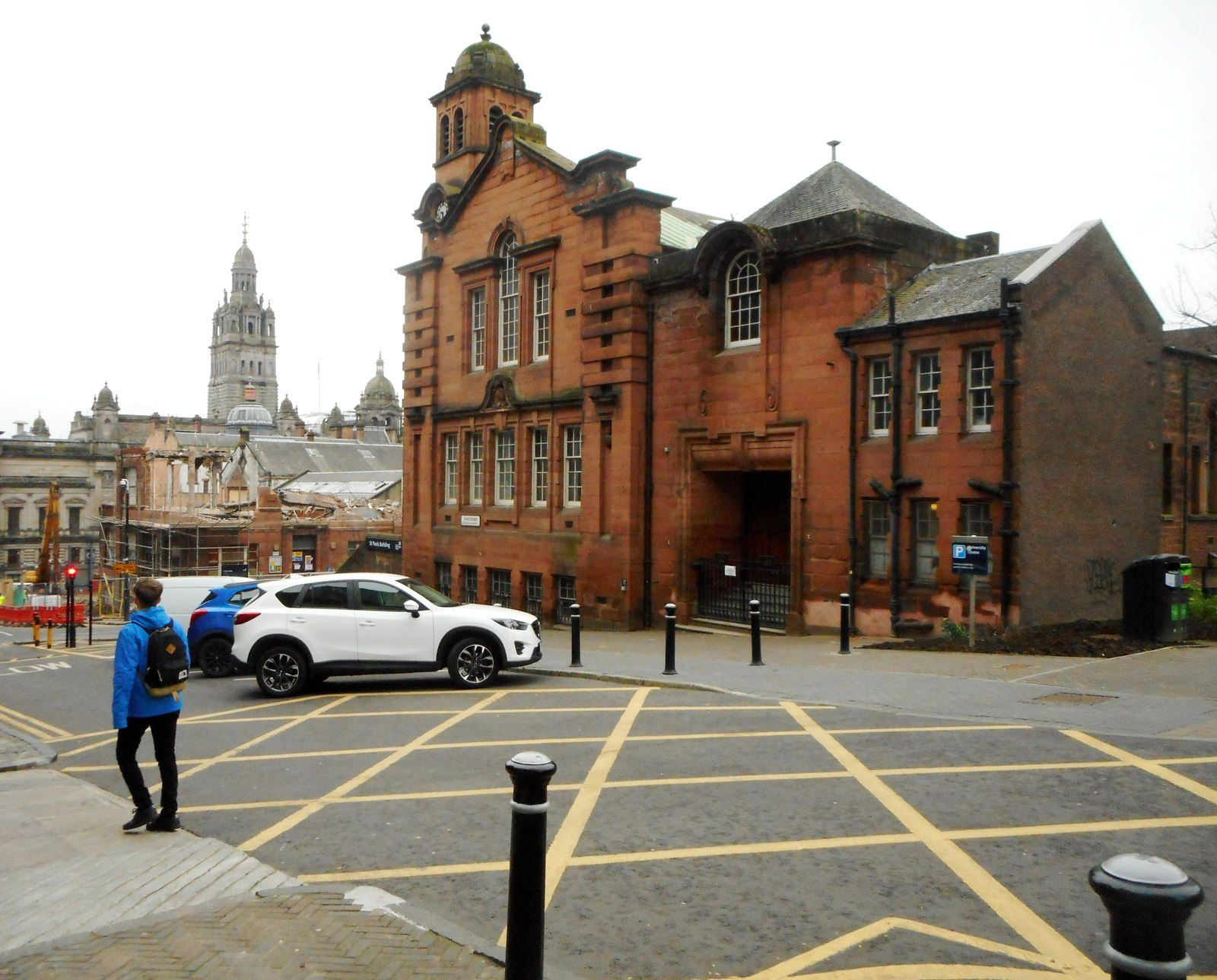
The south western elevation of St Paul's with Glasgow City Chambers visible in the background

In line with the University of Strathclyde's long-term plans to consolidate and renew the John Anderson Campus, much of the university's presence in the John Street area has gradually diminished, with the student's union moving to a new location and the Chaplaincy Centre moving into the Graham Hills Building in 2018, with only the Muslim Student's Association still occupying the St Pauls. The demolition of the adjacent registry office by Glasgow City Council in 2014, and its replacement with a hotel and a high rise apartment tower in 2023 has changed the use of the area to being largely residential again. It is speculated that the former church will eventually be sold and repurposed.
