= Strathclyde School of Architecture =

- Architecture Building
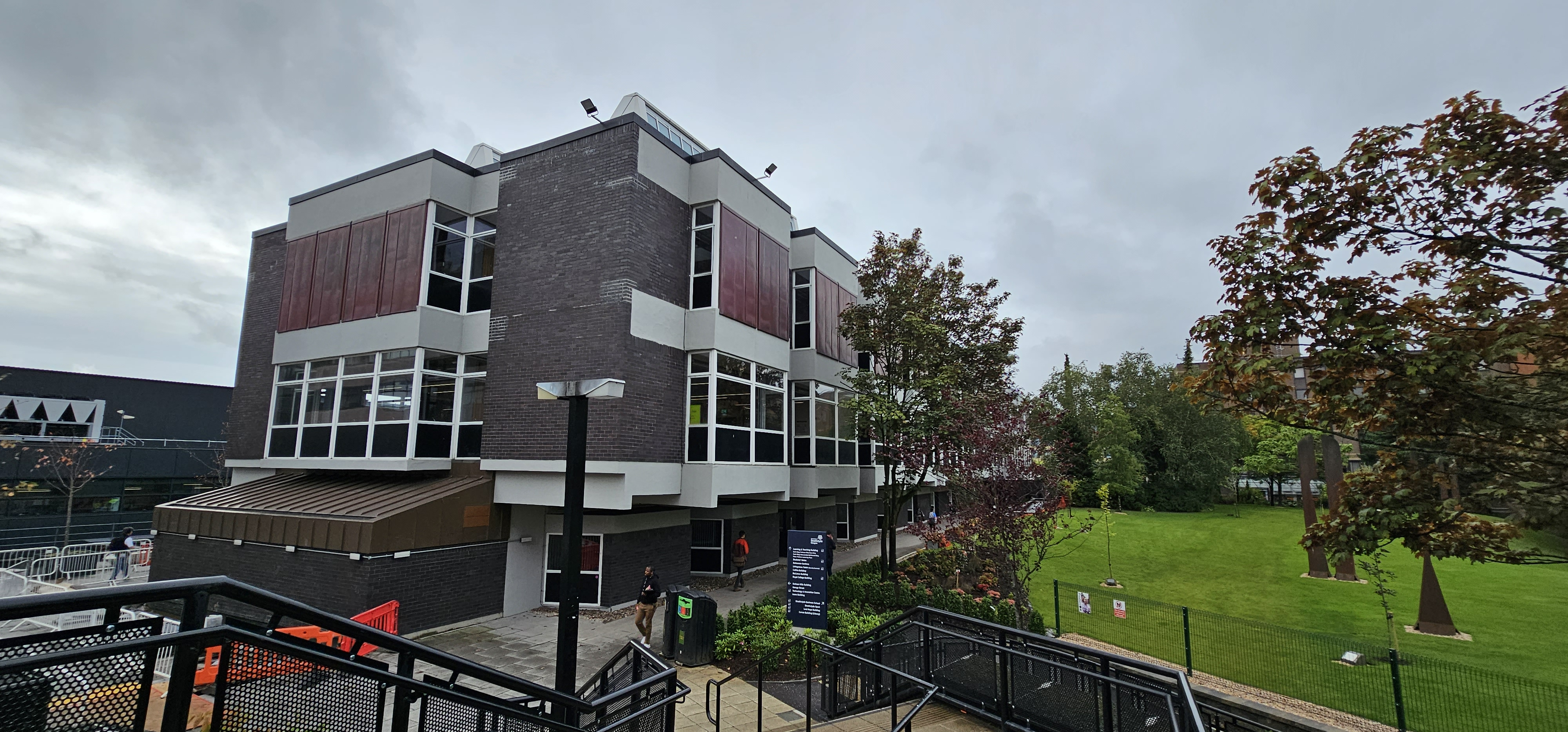
- The Architecture Building looking west, with Gerald Laing's Callinish sculpture to the right.
- Alternative names: Learning and Teaching Building: Mary Dunn Wing

General information
- Type: Academic
- Architectural style: Brutalist
- Location: 131 Rottenrow, Glasgow
- Coordinates: (55.86191°N 4.24225°W)
- Year built: 1964-67
- Opened: 1967
- Cost: £307,107
- Owner: University of Strathclyde

Technical details
- Floor count: 2
- Lifts/elevators: 1

Design and construction
- Architect: Prof Frank Fielden
- Architecture firm: Frank Fielden & Associates

The Strathclyde School of Architecture (colloquially known as the Architecture Building, but now officially called the Mary Dunn Wing), is an academic building in Glasgow, Scotland and part of the University of Strathclyde, John Anderson Campus.

At its completion in 1967, it was notable for being the first purpose built architecture school in the United Kingdom for thirty years and is a celebrated piece of Brutalist architecture within the city. Since 2012, it has been protected as a Category B listed building.

== Background and Construction ==
The Architecture Building was constructed between 1966 and 1967 to a design by Professor Frank Fielden (1915-2001) - then the head of the Department of Architecture of Building Science at the newly established University of Strathclyde. The building is to date, the only building on the campus to have been designed in-house. As part of the original campus masterplan by Robert Matthew, the closely related disciplines of Architecture and Civil Engineering would be clustered together in a single complex of two buildings. The neighbouring Colville Building (designed by Matthew's own practice), joins to the south of the Architecture School by way of an open air plaza. The thin footprint of the building reflected its restricted position at the summit of Balmanno Brae, with the northern elevation looking out onto a landscaped area containing Gerald Laing's Callanish steel sculptures.

The exterior of the building consists of 12 precast concrete bays decorated by copperised screening panels, which are cantilevered over a pedestrian walkway at ground level, thus giving shelter from the elements.

The interior of the building was designed in an open plan fashion, with design studios framed by a service core containing toilets, stairways and smaller seminar rooms. Fielden also designed bespoke furniture for the building which allowed for spaces to be adapted for individual needs.

The building was formally opened by The 4th Viscount Esher, on 16 February 1967.

== Later Developments ==
In 2004, the university embarked on a 20-year programme of remodelling and renewal of the John Anderson Campus. Part of this was to cluster the engineering departments on the "Island Site" (the original Royal College and James Weir Building) - with both the Departments of Architecture and Civil Engineering moving from their former homes, thus leaving both the School of Architecture and the Colville Building redundant. This led to initial fears that the building may be demolished

In September 2012, the building was granted Grade B listed status by Historic Scotland

In 2017, the university announced a £60m project to redevelop both the Architecture and Colville Buildings into a Learning and Teaching Hub. Construction began in 2018 with the strip out of both buildings, and the new complex opened in July 2021, construction having been delayed by the COVID-19 pandemic. The Architecture Building was given the new name Mary Dunn Wing in relation to the university's first female professor
