= Wolfson Centre =

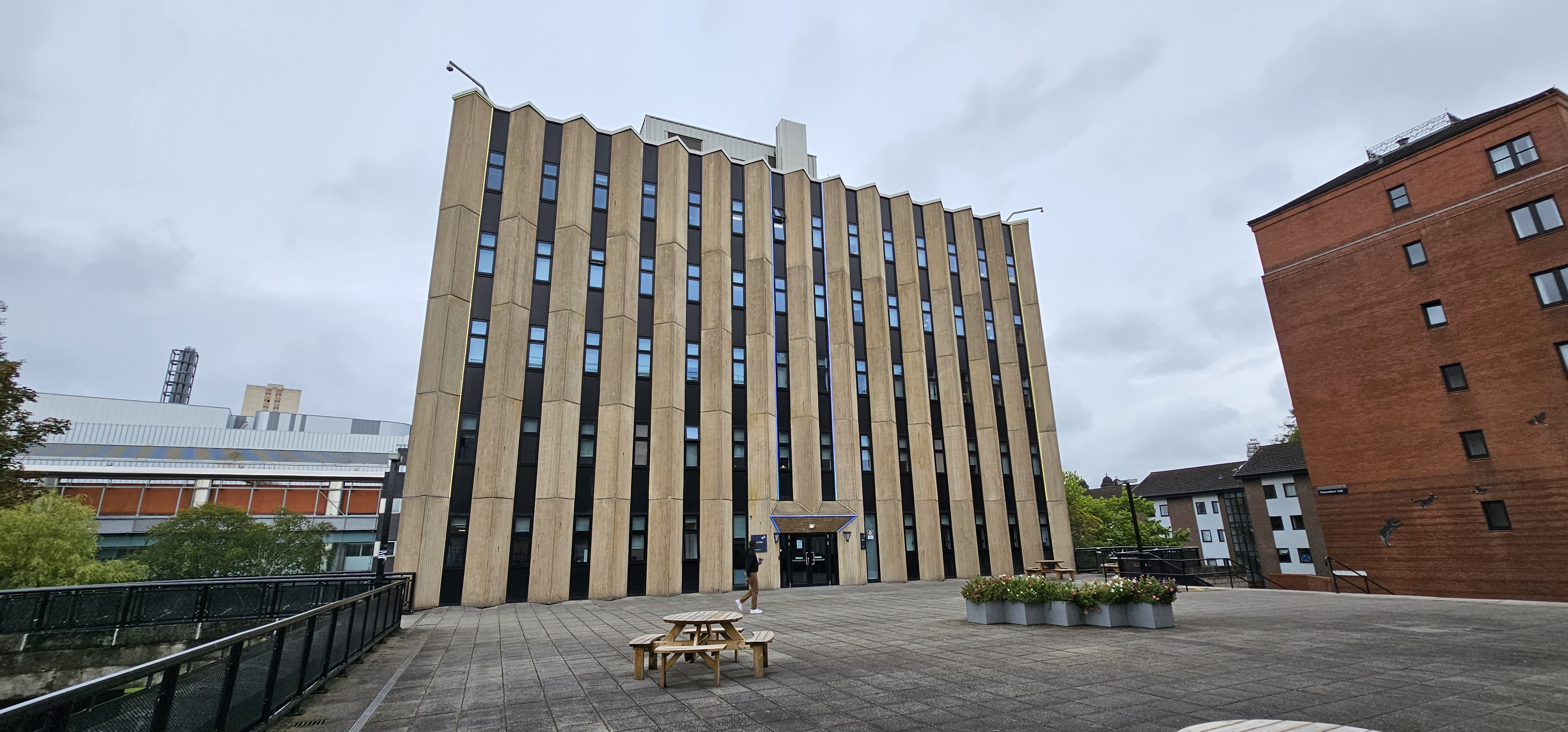
- North elevation of the Wolfson Centre
- Interactive map of the Wolfson Centre area

General information
- Type: Academic
- Architectural style: Brutalist
- Location: 106 Rottenrow, Glasgow
- Coordinates: (55.862075°N 4.241087°W)
- Year built: 1971–72
- Opened: 1972
- Cost: £250,000
- Owner: University of Strathclyde

Technical details
- Floor count: 5
- Lifts/elevators: 2

Design and construction
- Architecture firm: Morris, Steedman Architects

The Wolfson Centre is an academic building within the city of Glasgow, Scotland and part of the University of Strathclyde's John Anderson Campus.

The structure, completed in 1972 houses the Department of Biomedical Engineering, and is a celebrated example of Brutalist architecture within the city, and is protected as a Grade B listed building. It is named for Isaac Wolfson of the Wolfson Foundation, and was initially known as the Wolfson Centre for Bioengineering to distinguish it from other academic buildings around the United Kingdom that had been funded by the Wolfson Foundation.

== Background and history ==
Following the creation of Strathclyde University in 1964 from the Royal College of Science and Technology, a masterplan was drawn up to expand the campus to the east of the original Royal College building. The architect Robert Matthew was appointed oversee a masterplan for the area rezoned for educational use by Glasgow Corporation east of Montrose Street, which was undergoing slum clearance as part of the Townhead Comprehensive Development Area (CDA). Part of the plan would be a dedicated building for the new Bioengineering Unit, which as a primarily research-led department would be kept separate from the other engineering departments based in the James Weir Building.

The university approached the Wolfson Foundation, who granted the £250,000 necessary to construct the building, which was designed by Morris Steedman Architects and opened in by Lady Wolfson in 1972.

The building was granted Grade B listed status by Historic Scotland on 4 September 2012 on account of it being "well-detailed and little-altered example of a post-war Modernist educational building by one of Scotland's most eminent architectural practices".

In 2021, the university completed a £15m refurbishment of the building, conducted by Keir Construction which saw the exterior restored, refurbished laboratory and office spaces and a fire escape stairway built on the southern side to update the building's fire safety compliance.
