= Livingstone Tower =

- Former names: Alec House; Social Sciences Building

General information
- Status: Completed
- Type: Academic
- Architectural style: International Modern
- Location: Glasgow, Scotland
- Coordinates: 55°51′40.42″N 4°14′36.45″W
- Current tenants: University of Strathclyde
- Year built: 1962–64
- Completed: 1964
- Inaugurated: 9 February 1966
- Owner: Glasgow City Council

Height
- Roof: 52 metres (171 ft) (estimated)

Technical details
- Structural system: Reinforced Concrete
- Floor count: 15 (+ 2 underground parking levels)
- Lifts/elevators: 4

Design and construction
- Architect: Covell, Matthews & Partners
- Developer: Glasgow Corporation / Royal College of Science and Technology
- Main contractor: Sir Robert McAlpine

The Livingstone Tower is a prominent high rise building in Glasgow, Scotland and is a part of the University of Strathclyde's John Anderson Campus. The building was named after David Livingstone. The address of the building is 26 Richmond Street, Glasgow.

The building is the tallest structure on the John Anderson Campus, and is a notable landmark in the eastern side of the city centre, and its high position on the drumlin of Rottenrow means it can be seen from some considerable distance throughout the city's East End. It is one of a cluster of high-rise buildings to be constructed in the centre of Glasgow during the early 1960s; the others being St Andrew House (1964), Fleming House (1961), the Royal Stuart Hotel (1963) – and the nearby Glasgow College of Building and Printing (1964), with which it shares many design and engineering similarities.

== Construction and history ==
=== Early years ===
The Livingstone Tower was constructed between 1962 and 1964 as Alec House – a commercial office building in a partnership between Glasgow Corporation, the former Royal College of Science and Technology and a commercial development company. The site was formerly occupied by a row of houses and a church, but these were cleared in 1960 after Townhead was declared a Comprehensive Development Area (CDA) in the 1950s. As part of this development – inspired by the findings of the 1945 Bruce Report, central areas of the city were re-zoned for commercial or educational use - in the case of the Richmond Street site this was in anticipation of the adjacent Royal College's impending elevation to university status. Groundbreaking on the site commenced in April 1962.

The building is of reinforced concrete construction and was state of the art in its construction methods at the time – being clad with a curtain wall in opaque dark green glass spandrel panels framed by orange metal uprights. With its original commercial use in mind, it featured an advanced elevator system for its day – four Otis Autotronic high speed lifts (also used in St. Andrew House on Sauchiehall Street) which were capable of responding to the traffic flow within the building at specific times of the day. The tower is served by two staircases within the main service core while a third staircase that serves only the first two floors was added by the University in 1966 due to these levels being devoted entirely to classrooms. The building is electrically heated and was also intended to feature a restaurant on the ground floor which the University later turned into a student refectory.

The tower sits atop a 3-storey concrete podium shared with the neighbouring McCance Building, an NCP car park, and a row of retail units at street level on George Street. There is also private car parking for Glasgow City Council. There was also a raised concrete podium between the tower and the McCance Building – originally this was an open-air plaza connecting the two buildings, which also contained a drive through drop-off area facing the west side of the building which formed its main entrance – this space was replaced by the Collins Building in 1973 (see below), when the building's entrance was moved to the Richmond Street side in conjunction with a new campus security office.

In early 1965, shortly after the creation of the University of Strathclyde from the Royal College, the building had still not attracted any private tenants. The adjacent McCance Building (part of the same complex) was built to house the expanding Andersonian Library, as well as the Royal College's new arts and social sciences departments. The two buildings ultimately became part of a plan to expand the University by adding more buildings and learning space, and an agreement was reached with Glasgow Corporation to lease the building for 99 years. The lease was formally signed on 2 February 1965. In May of that same year, the University dropped the original Alec House name and initially renamed it the "David Livingstone Tower" after David Livingstone – in recognition of his study at the medical school of Anderson's College (the original institution from which Strathclyde University evolved), but the name was soon shortened to simply "Livingstone Tower". At the time the building was used to expand the departments that were to be included in the McCance Building.

The building was formally opened by the then university Chancellor, Lord Todd of Trumpington on 9 February 1966.

=== Later developments ===
In 1967, a roof penthouse was added which contained an on-campus residence for the Principal.

The entrances and ground floor of the building were substantially remodelled in the early 1970s – in 1972 the original entrance plaza to the west of the tower was replaced by the Collins Building, with new office spaces created on what was the ground floor foyer. A security services building was added on the north side, which now contained the main entrance to the tower from 26 Richmond Street.

In 2000, the Hunter Centre for Entrepreneurship was given purpose-built accommodation by expanding the roof penthouse into offices, thus creating a fourteenth floor, accessed by stairs from the thirteenth floor. It was part of the Strathclyde Entrepreneurship Initiative. The Hunter Centre provides elective classes related to different areas of business. It was named after Sir Tom Hunter after his £5 million endowment to the university to help fund the new centre. In 2011 they relocated to the 199 Cathedral Street building, being replaced with the Strathclyde Business School Centre for Corporate Connections department.

The building received a refurbishment in 2010, which saw internal realignment of some rooms and facilities, replacement of the outer spandrel panels, a new modern languages centre built, and the floors redesignated by transposing the ground floor to level 1, thus the former roof terrace becoming Level 15. The studios of the radio station Celtic Music Radio used to be on the 14th Floor of the building within the Hunter Centre.

Under the University's £300m masterplan for campus consolidation and renewal published in the 2000s, it was proposed to vacate the entire Livingstone Tower/McCance/Collins Building complex and relocate the Humanities and Social Sciences departments to the Lord Hope Building in Cathedral Street. A revised plan was released in 2011 which showed that the tower would remain in use until the year 2023, after which the building would be returned to Glasgow City Council for future redevelopment. However as of 2023, the plan has stalled, and the tower will remain part of the University's estate for the foreseeable future.

== Location ==
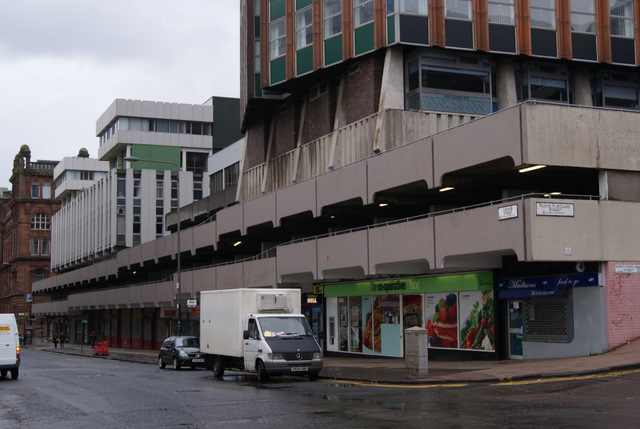
The base of the tower along George Street shows the larger development it forms part of. The McCance and Collins Buildings are to the rear of the picture

The building is located within the John Anderson Campus of the University of Strathclyde. It is part of a mixed-use development which includes the University's own McCance and Collins Buildings, a two-storey sub-surface NCP car park, and a row of retail units at street level on George Street. There is also private car parking for Glasgow City Council.

The tower itself (arguably designed in the International Style) follows a contrasting architectural paradigm to the rest of the attaching buildings, which are of a distinctly Brutalist style – fashionable in the 1960s.

== In popular culture ==
Games developer Chris Sawyer, an alumnus of the University of Strathclyde, based one of the skyscraper sprites appearing in the computer game Transport Tycoon on Livingstone Tower. Livingstone Tower is affectionately known by students as 'Livvy Tower' or 'Livi tower' and is one of the most popular buildings on campus.

The tower was also included within a shot from the 2026 film Premature which was set in Glasgow.

An Instagram fan account calling itself the "Official Account of Livingstone Tower" also frequently shares images of the tower.

== Departments ==
The Livingstone Tower is the home to many departments including:

1. Computer and Information Sciences
2. Mathematics and Statistics
3. English Language Teaching Division
4. Strathclyde Business School Centre for Corporate Connections
