= John Anderson Campus =

University campus in Glasgow, Scotland

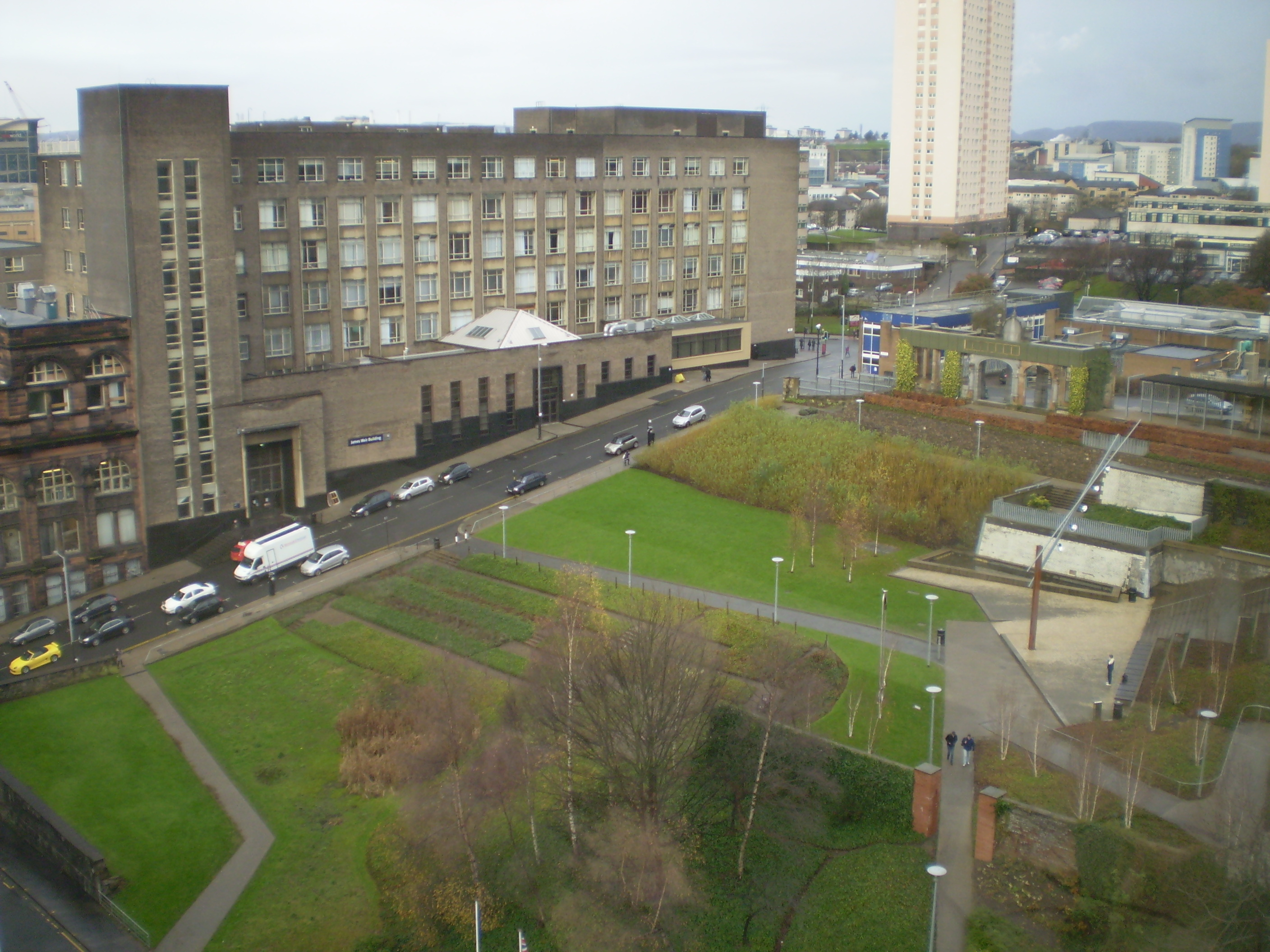
Aerial view of the John Anderson Campus with the James Weir Building and Rottenrow Gardens in the foreground.

The John Anderson Campus, the main campus of The University of Strathclyde, is in Glasgow, Scotland. The campus is self-contained in its own area which straddles the Townhead and Merchant City districts on the north eastern side of the city centre, while being only minutes from the M8 Motorway, George Square and is located midway between Queen Street Railway Station and High Street station on the North Clyde Line.

== History ==
=== Early history (pre-1960) ===
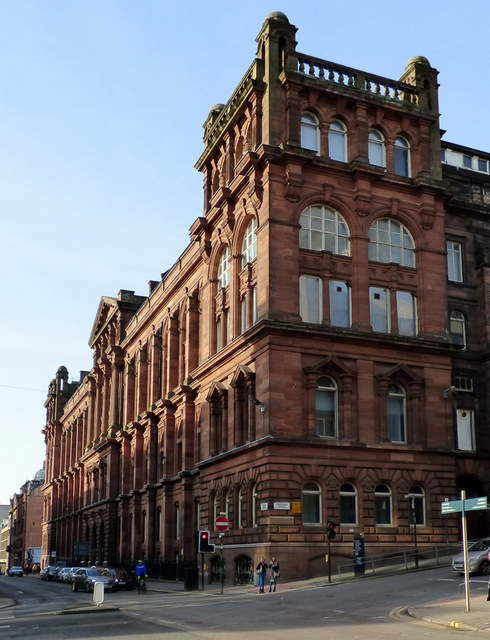
The original Royal College Building on George Street

The John Anderson Campus was originally the only site of Strathclyde University, with the Jordanhill Campus becoming incorporated in 1993. It is named after John H. D. Anderson (1726–1796), a former Professor of Natural Philosophy at the University of Glasgow, who left instructions in his will with a large bequest to found "a place of useful learning for the good of mankind and the improvement of science". The result was a school for Glasgow, which would teach practical subjects appealing to people normally left out of the collegiate educational system, such as craftsmen and women from the city.

Anderson's Institution was established in 1796, renamed Anderson's University in 1828, partially to fulfil Anderson's vision of two universities in the city of Glasgow. In 1877, it was forced to remove the title of 'University' as it lacked a Royal Warrant for the claim, becoming Anderson's College.

Ten years later in 1887 it merged with the Allan Glen's School to become the Glasgow & West of Scotland Technical College. In 1912, the technical college was renamed the Royal Technical College, and became the Royal College of Science and Technology in 1956. It joined with the Scottish College of Commerce in 1964; later the same year, the merged institution became the University of Strathclyde.

Plans to expand the Royal College buildings had been mooted since the 1930s, and redundant housing on the northern section of John Street and Montrose Street was cleared in 1937 in preparation for this, however the war intervened and the plans were put on hold. Major post-war development of the campus resumed in 1956, when construction of the new Montrose Street block to the rear of the Royal College building began. The James Weir Building, as it would later be named, would house new accommodation for the Mechanical, Chemical and Production Engineering departments. Phase I of the James Weir was completed in 1958. A new students union building on John Street followed in 1959. A new Chemistry block (the Thomas Graham Building) was completed in 1962 in conjunction with Phase II of the James Weir which adjoined onto its eastern end. This completed the "Island Site" of the John Anderson Campus as it is now called.

=== 1960s–1970s: Rapid Development ===
Following the granting of university status to the Royal College in 1964, the campus grew in size rapidly, with most of the current academic buildings constructed during this period. Plans to redevelop the adjacent Richmond Street site had already begun in 1960 in collaboration with Glasgow Corporation, who had cleared the site of its slum housing. This development would provide a new library and central admin building (the McCance Building) which opened in 1964. The 13-storey office tower (Alec House) built as part of the same development struggled to find commercial tenants was eventually leased to the University in 1965 and renamed the Livingstone Tower, and would house various social sciences departments.

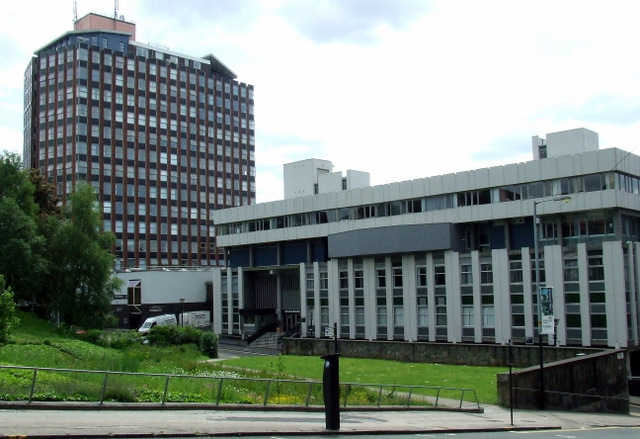
The Livingstone Tower and McCance Building – both completed in 1964 – marked the start of the campus' rapid expansion.

Prior to the 1960s, Balmanno Brae – the area bounded by North Portland Street, High Street, Cathedral Street and George Street had consisted mainly of tenement housing – much of which had deteriorated into slums. Following the 1940s Bruce Report, Townhead was designated a Comprehensive Development Area (CDA), the population was rehomed and all of the slums were demolished. The Colville and Architecture buildings were constructed on this space in 1966, followed by the John Anderson Building and Wolfson Centre in 1971 and 1972, respectively. The mid 1970s saw the business school buildings constructed – namely the Stenhouse (1973) and William Duncan (1977) buildings were completed at this time. The first of the student residences – Birkbeck Court – were constructed between 1972 and 1974.

In 1974, the University reached an agreement with the book publisher William Collins, Sons to acquire its former printing works at the eastern end of Cathedral Street and St James's Road. The University demolished all of the former Collins estate except for three buildings – the Curran Building (1981) was a former warehouse that was converted into a home for the Andersonian Library, the Lord Hope Building (1983) was an office block that was converted for academic use. One of the former Collins buildings at 181 St James's Road was also retained and is used as a workshop and base for the Estates Management group.

=== 1980s–2000s: The Student Village ===
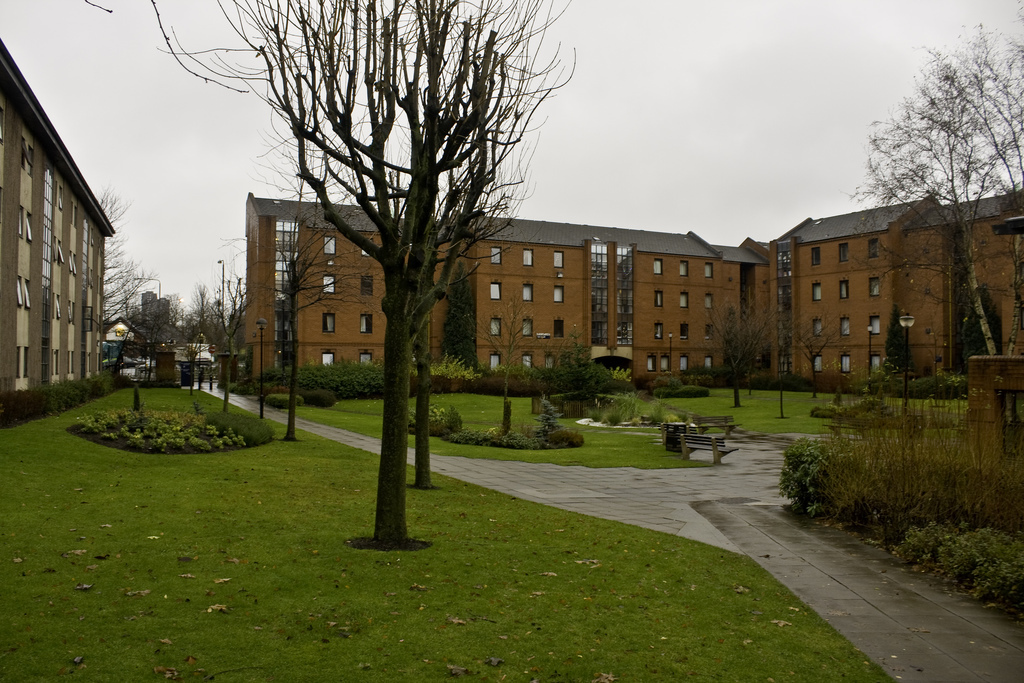
Much of the Student Village was constructed in the late 1980s and early 1990s

No new academic buildings were constructed in the 1980s as newly installed principal Graham Hills concentrated on getting the University's finances back in order. The major developments during this time were the purchase and restoration of both the Ramshorn and Barony churches in 1982 and 1986, respectively and the acquisition of Marland House from British Telecom in 1987. Construction resumed on the student residences at the end of the decade, with Forbes, Murray and Garnett Halls all being constructed in the late 1980s, with James Blyth, Thomas Campbell Courts and Chancellors' Hall being completed between 1990 and 1992.

1992 saw the opening of the first new academic building in over a decade with the construction of the Graduate Business School, with the Robertson Trust Wing (later named after the then current principal Sir John Arbuthnott) being completed in 1998, thus allowing the James P. Todd Building on Albion Street to be sold off to private developers.

Throughout the 1990s, the University would slowly redevelop areas of the former Marland House, by now named the Graham Hills Building.

=== 2000– present: Major Redevelopment ===
Following the closure of the Royal Maternity Hospital on Rottenrow, the University acted quickly to acquire and demolish the old hospital site that lay in the centre of the campus. Demolition began in 2002 and the land was landscaped into a new public park called "Rottenrow Gardens", which opened the year after.

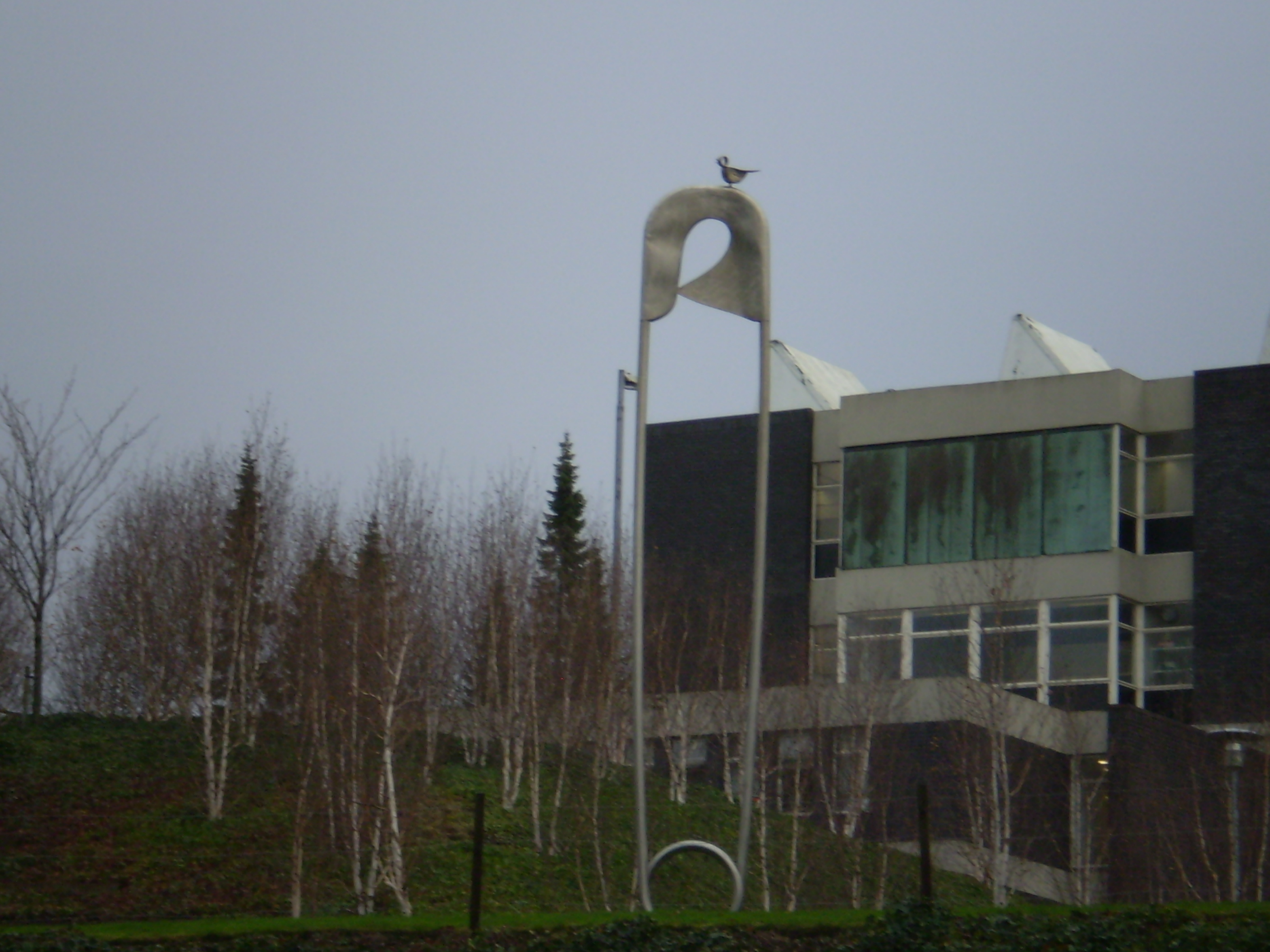
Safety Pin memorial on Rottenrow Gardens

In the mid 2000s a major appraisal of the University's estate took place, with a view to consolidating into a smaller number of buildings. The two major off-campus student residences (Baird Hall and Clyde Hall) were sold to private developers. Following the merger in 1993 between the University and the former Jordanhill College, plans were made to eventually vacate the former Jordanhill Campus, and relocate the Faculty of Education to the John Anderson Campus. This led to the underused Lord Hope Building being reconfigured for use by Arts and Humanities. The first phase was to substantially redevelop the James Weir Building, freeing up redundant space relocate the Civil Engineering and Architecture departments from the Colville and Architecture Buildings, respectively. This was a controversial move, as the Architecture School was by now a celebrated piece of Brutalist architecture now threatened with demolition. In 2018, it was announced that a new teaching and learning hub will be created from these two buildings, scheduled to open in 2021.

Below is a synopsis of each building, its year of completion, and its current occupier in brackets.

- 1912 Completion of Royal College Building
- 1953 Royal College acquires St Paul's Church (Houses the Chaplaincy Centre)
- 1958 James Weir Building Phase I (Mechanical, Design, Chemical, Civil, Manufacturing Engineering) – extended in 1963.
- 1959 Students' Union Building (closed in 2021)
- 1959 Graham Hills Building (Built as "Marland House" by the General Post Office, acquired by the University in 1987)
- 1962 Thomas Graham Building (Chemistry)
- 1963 James Weir Building Phase II
- 1964 McCance Building (Houses central administration, History, Politics, Registry)
- 1965 Livingstone Tower (Mathematics, Statistics, Languages and Computer Sciences(CIS) )
- 1967 Architecture Building (redeveloped 2019–21)
- 1967 Colville Building (originally Civil Engineering and Physics – redeveloped 2019–21)
- 1971 John Anderson Building (Physics)
- 1972 Wolfson Centre (Bioengineering), Phase I of Birkbeck Court residences
- 1973 Collins Building (Collins Gallery, Senate/Court suites)
- 1973 Stenhouse Building (Law and Business School)
- 1974 Callanish sculpture and landscaped area (popularly known as "Steelhenge"), Birkbeck Court Phase II
- 1975 University Centre (Refectory, Staff Club, Sports Centre)
- 1975 Alexander Turnbull Building (Printing, AV Services) – was divested in 2016 into a housing development
- 1976 Todd Centre (Pharmacology) – Demolished in 2008-9 and replaced by the SIPBS building in 2010.
- 1976 James Weir/Students Union building extension
- 1977 William Duncan Building (Strathclyde Business School)
- 1980 Curran Building created from former William Collins & Sons warehouse (houses Andersonian Library)
- 1983 Lord Hope Building (originally built as the Montgomery Building for William Collins & Sons in 1953)
- 1983 Acquisition of St David's Church (and the Ramshorn Cemetery) – Drama School and Strathclyde Theatre Group.
- 1984 Lord Todd restaurant, acquisition of the Barony Hall
- 1987 Acquisition of Marland House from British Telecom (see Graham Hills Building above)
- 1990 Opening of James Blyth and Thomas Campbell student residences
- 1991 Opening of Chancellors' Hall student residences
- 1992 Graduate Business School building opens
- 1997 Opening of James Goold Hall of Residence
- 1998 John Arbuthnott Building (Strathclyde Institute for Pharmacy and Biomedical Sciences)
- 2001 Acquisition of the Rottenrow maternity hospital site – demolition of the Glasgow Royal Maternity Hospital
- 2002 Thomas Graham Building extension completed
- 2004 Rottenrow Gardens Opened
- 2010 Hamnett Wing of the new Strathclyde Institute for Pharmacy and Biomedical Sciences building on Cathedral Street
- 2014 Strathclyde Institute for Sport opens – replaces the old University Centre building.
- 2015 University of Strathclyde Technology and Innovation Centre completed
- 2021 Learning and Teaching Building completed (from former Colville/Architecture buildings – contains relocated Student's Union)
- 2022 Rottenrow, North Portland Street and Richmond Streets are acquired from Glasgow City Council to be pedestrianized and incorporated into Rottenrow Gardens.

== Accommodation ==
Strathclyde University provides accommodation for most of the first year undergraduates. Historically, the University also operated two fully serviced halls of residence off-campus elsewhere in the city centre – Baird Hall on Sauchiehall Street and Clyde Hall on Jamaica Street. Both were former hotels (The Beresford and the Royal Stuart, respectively), but the University sold both to private developers in the early 2000s, the Beresford (a celebrated Art Deco structure) being turned into luxury housing, while the old Royal Stuart Hotel building is now a youth hostel.

The student village is located on the easterly half of the John Anderson Campus. Each accommodation block is named after a scientist or contributor to the University of Strathclyde.

Listed below are all of the accommodations on the campus, who they are named after and some basic information about the occupancy:

=== James Young Hall ===
The James Young Hall can be found next to Chancellors Hall at the south easterly corner of the accommodation block. The James Young Hall is one of the more expensive class of accommodation residencies which provide the luxuries of an en-suite bathroom (including showers/hand wash basin/toilet facilities) with each individual single study bedroom. These flats are available as 3- to 6-person flats. The students in each flat share a spacious kitchen, as well as a living and a dining room with a TV provided. Although the rent is steep, this includes heating and lighting as well as cleaning in the shared areas which you do not get in other accommodation such as the Thomas Campbell building. James Young, who is most well known for distilling paraffin wax from coal. His affiliation with the university started when he attended night classes at Anderson College (Strathclyde University), after being appointed assistant to Thomas Graham he worked up the academic ranks to become president of the college between 1868 and 1877 .

=== James Goold Hall ===
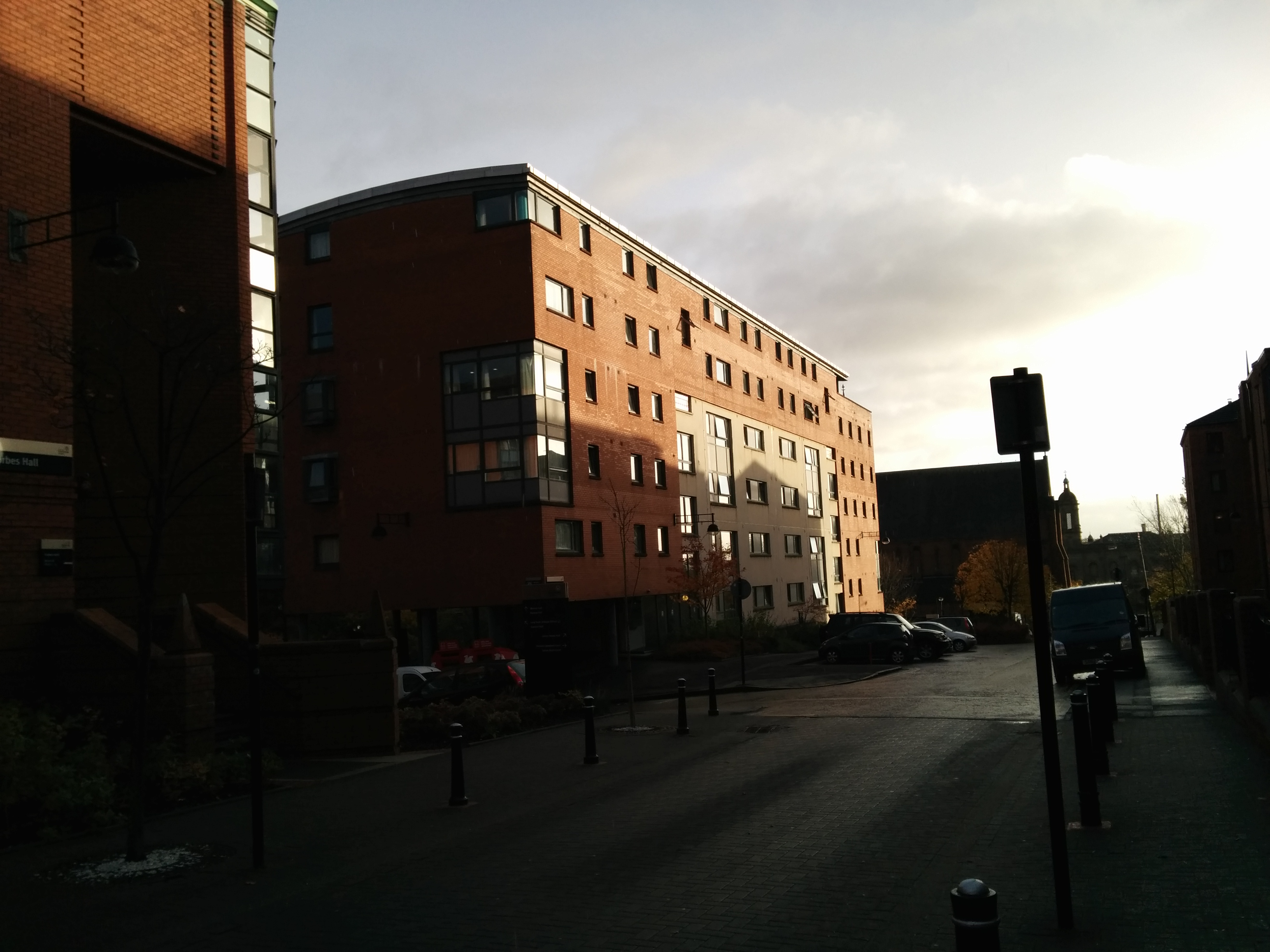
James Goold Hall

James Goold hall is one of the newest halls in the accommodation block. It supports 66 students, divided into 5/6/8 person flats. The hall was named after James Goold due to his involvement as Chairman of the Court of Strathclyde University in the years between 1993 and 1997

=== Murray Hall ===
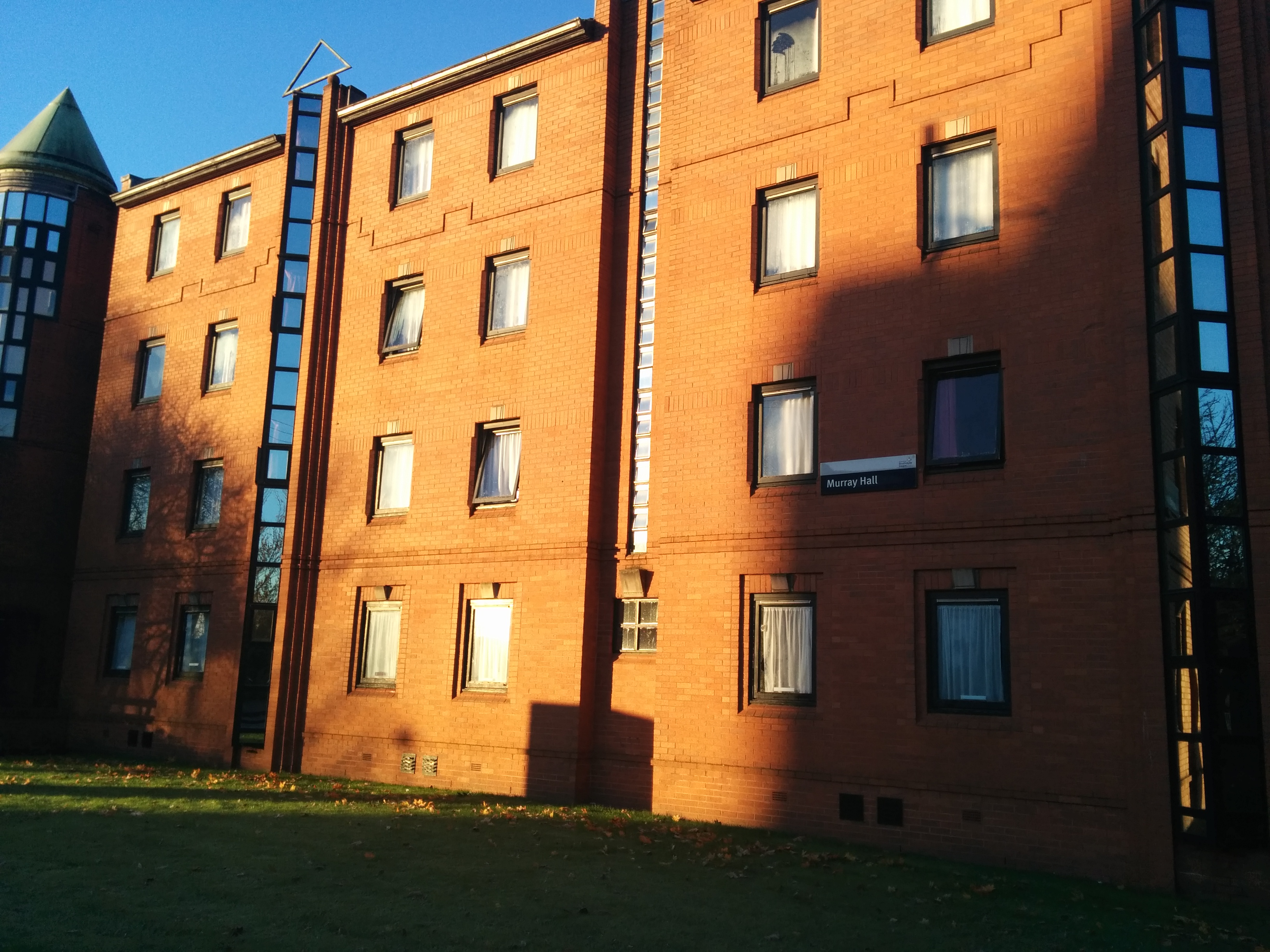
Murray Hall

Murray Hall is located at 75 Collins Street, Glasgow G4 0NG. This is the only residence in the Campus Village which is not divided into flats. Instead, 70 students have their own study bedrooms with wash-hand basins and share a large kitchen/living/dining room plus showers and WC facilities located on each floor. There are TVs on the 2nd and 4th floors. The rent for this residence includes heating/lighting plus a cleaning service for the shared areas. The contract period last for 39 weeks from September to June. Murray Hall was named after Lord Murray of Newhaven who was given an honorary degree in 1973. His full name is Keith Anderson Hope Murray, Baron Murray of Newhaven KCB. Murray was a British academic and Rector of Lincoln College, Oxford. He became a Research Officer for the AERI, a post he held until 1944. In 1937, however, he was appointed a Fellow and Bursar of Lincoln College, Oxford, as well as being appointed by the University to Oxford City Council.

=== Forbes Hall ===
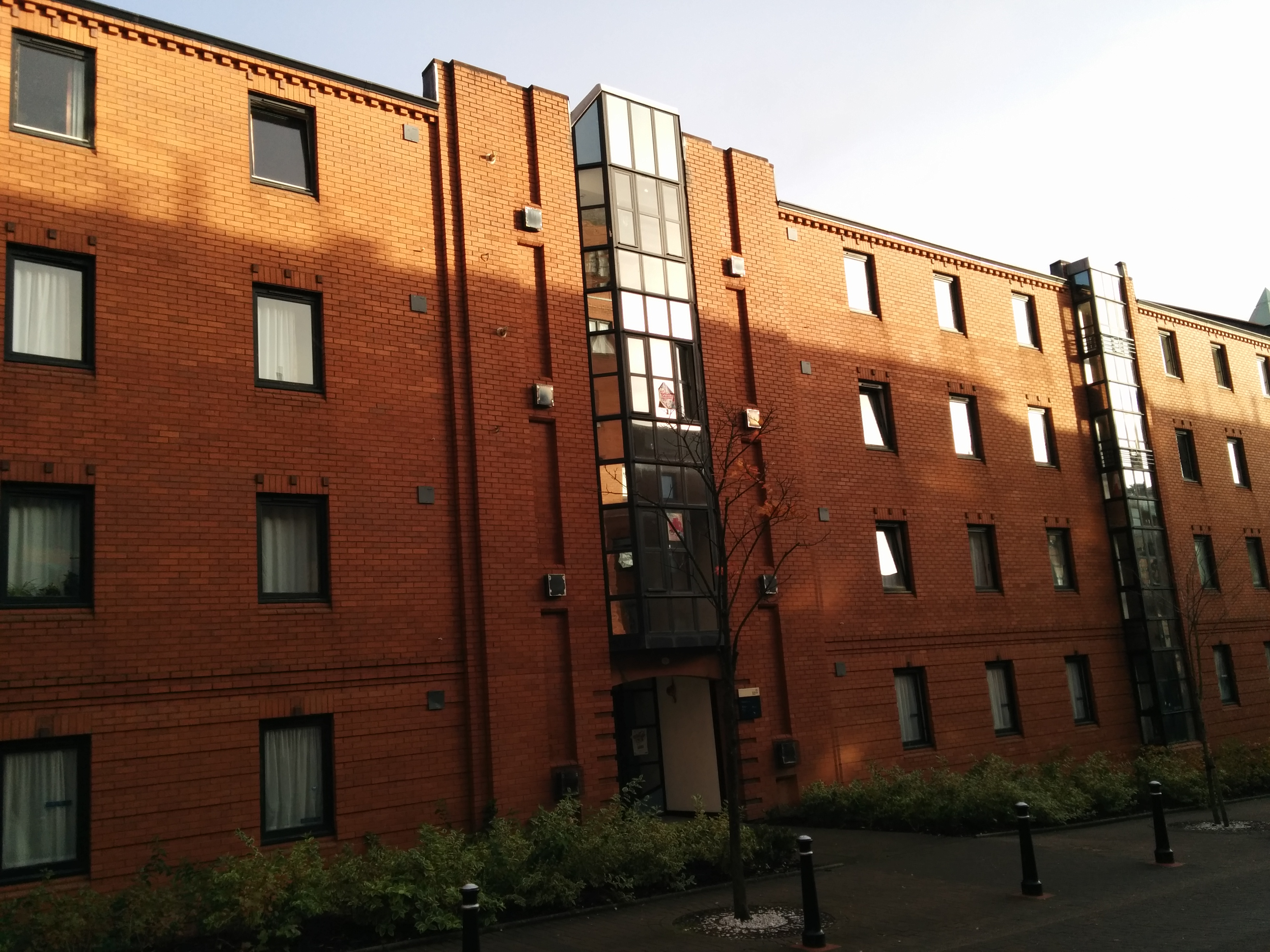
Forbes Hall

Named after George Forbes who is affiliated with the university through his appointment to professor of natural philosophy in 1873. The residence provides accommodation for 104 students. The hall is divided into 4 and 6 person's flats. Each flat has single study bedrooms with wash-hand basin. The residents share a kitchen, living/dining room with a TV provided. Other shared facilities include shower and toilet. The Forbes accommodation lines the north side of rotten row east which cuts the accommodation site in half.

=== Garnett Hall ===
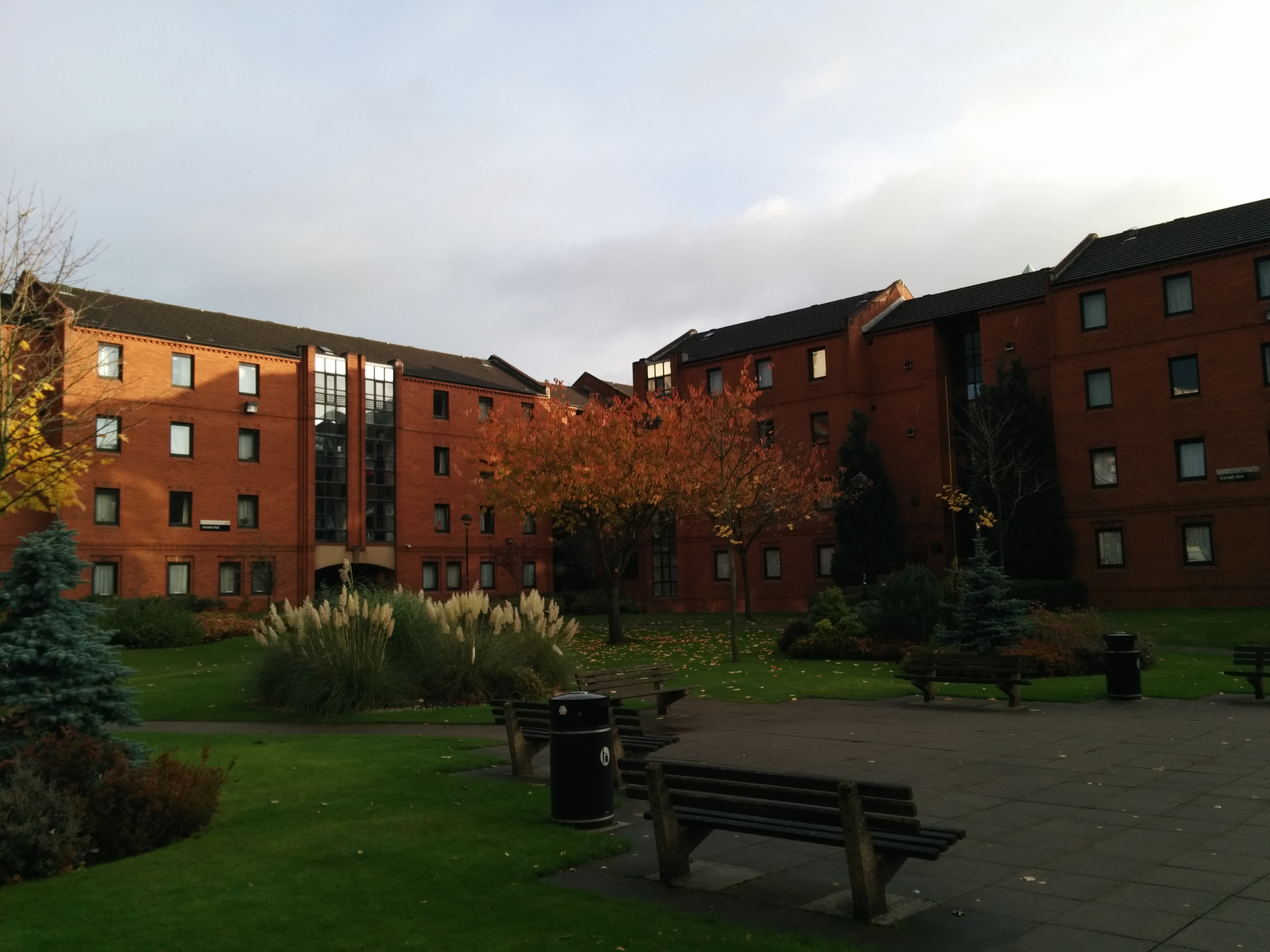
Garnett Hall

Garnett Hall lies in the north easternmost section of the accommodation area. Its three blocks have a very similar design to that of Forbes hall. It provides accommodation for 124 students in 4 – 6 person flats. The origin of the name is that of Thomas Garnett, a lecturer of physics and also very committed to the educational emancipation of women

=== James Blyth and Thomas Campbell Court ===
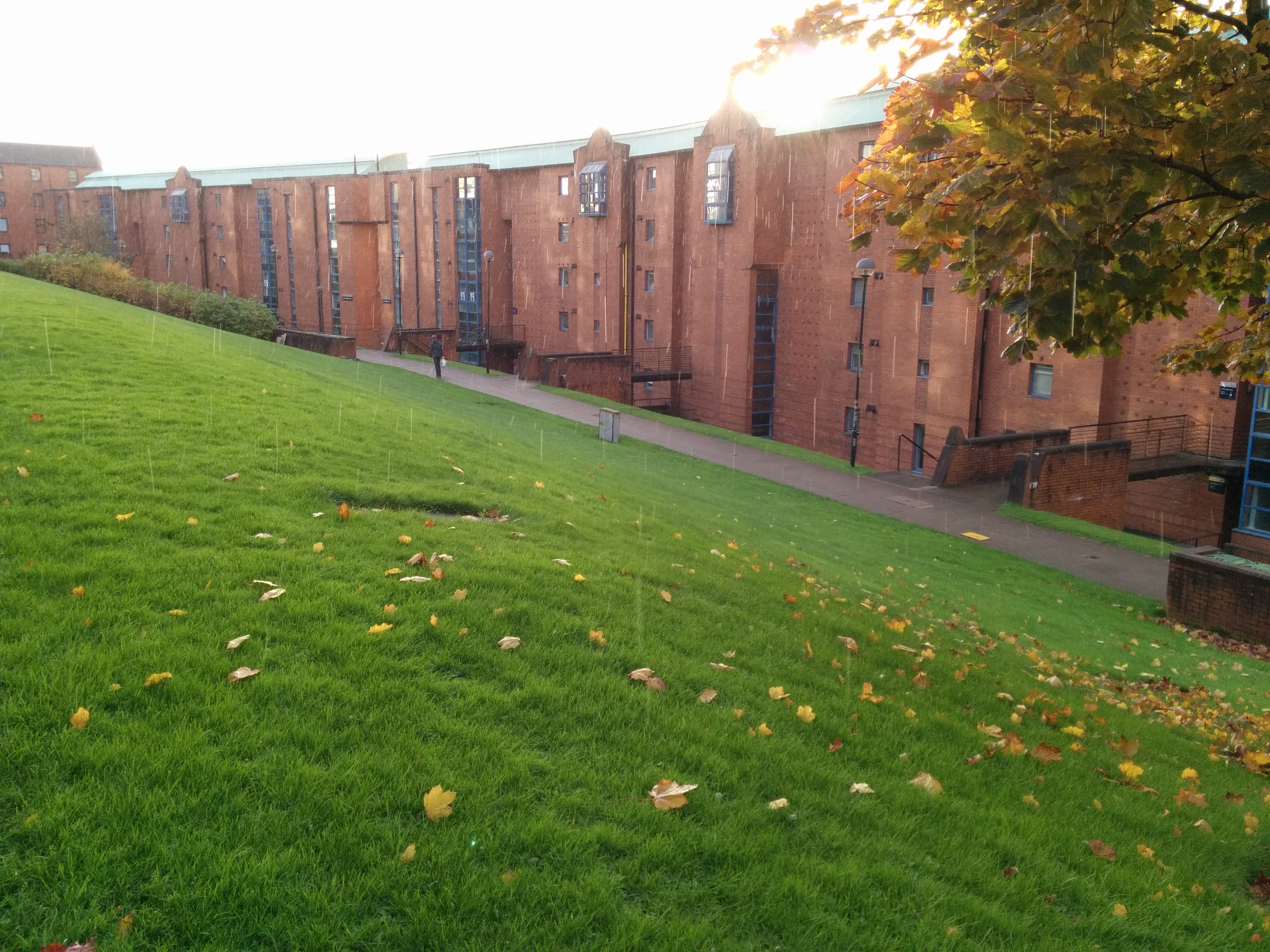
James Blyth Court

Built in 1990, James Blyth and Thomas Campbell court provide a combined accommodation for 372 students (216 in the James Blyth court, and 156 in the Thomas Campbell Court). Each flat is either a 4 or an 8-man flat, which then contains either 4 or 8 single study bedrooms. In each flat there is a centralised basic kitchen, living and dining room. There is also a shower room and toilet facilities available to all students. Both buildings are located on the steep bank south of rotten row east. James Blyth was a Scottish electrical engineer and a lecturer at the Anderson College, now better known as the University of Strathclyde. He was an almost famous figure around the Anderson College, hence the reason one of the accommodation blocks are named after him. Thomas Campbell was a Scottish poet who was known as one of the men behind the idea of London University. He was born in Glasgow in 1777 and died in Boulogne, France in 1844.

=== Chancellors Hall ===
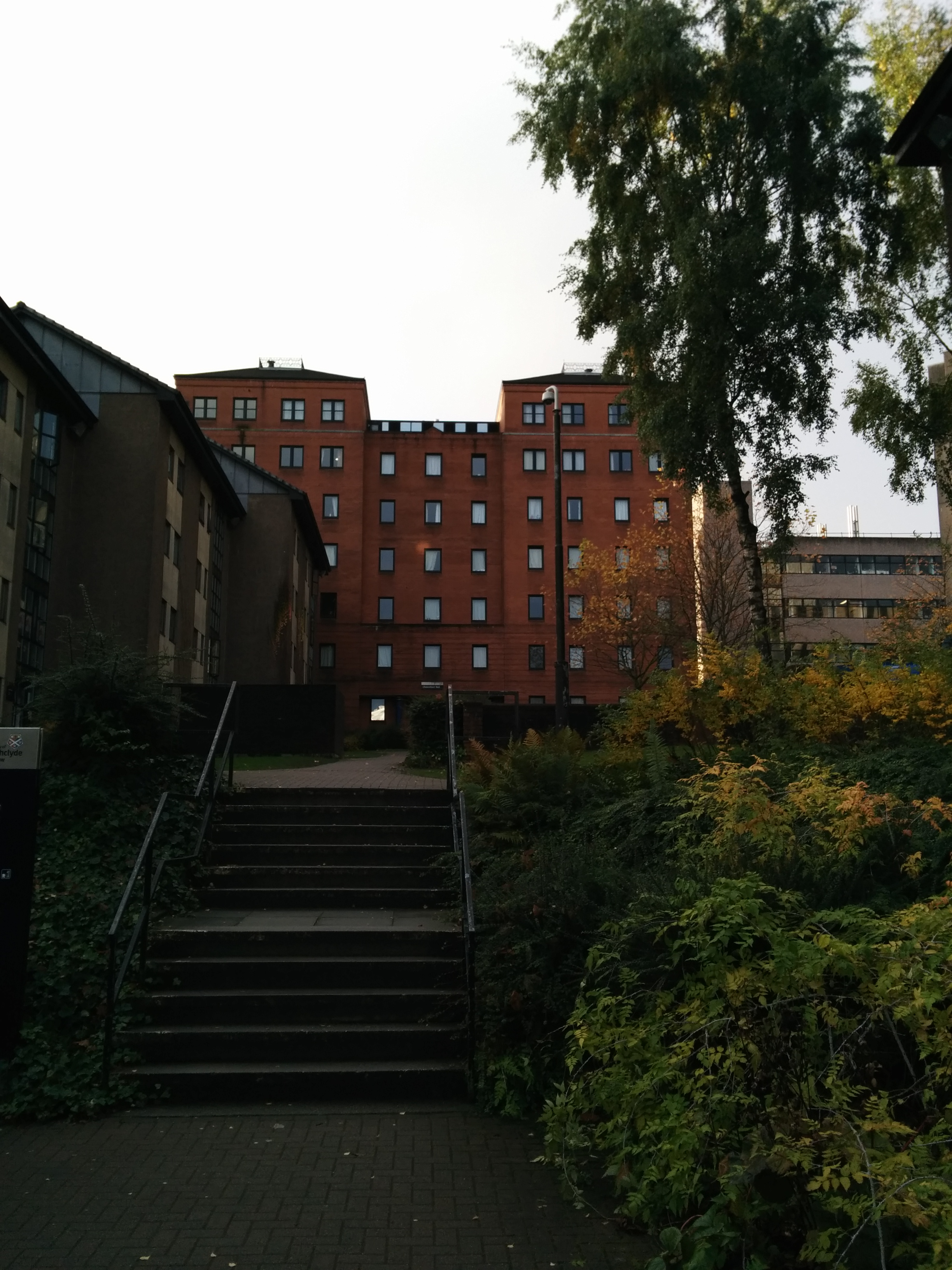
Chancellors Hall

Chancellors Hall is located at the intersection of rotten row east and taylor street. It is the tallest accommodation allowing up to 165 spaces available for students. These are separated into 3 to 6 people per flat. Every one of these bedrooms has an en suite shower/wash-hand basin/WC. The people on each flat share a large kitchen/living/dining room and a TV is also included. Rent includes heating/lighting and also a cleaning service for the shared areas of the flat. Chancellors Hall was named after The Chancellor Rt. Hon the Lord Smith of Kelvin. Lord Smith is one of Scotland's leading business figures and currently chairs the organising committee for the Glasgow 2014 Commonwealth Games. Lord Smith is currently chairman of SSE, Weir Group and the UK Green Investment Bank and is a non-executive director of Standard Bank Group South Africa.

=== Birkbeck Court ===
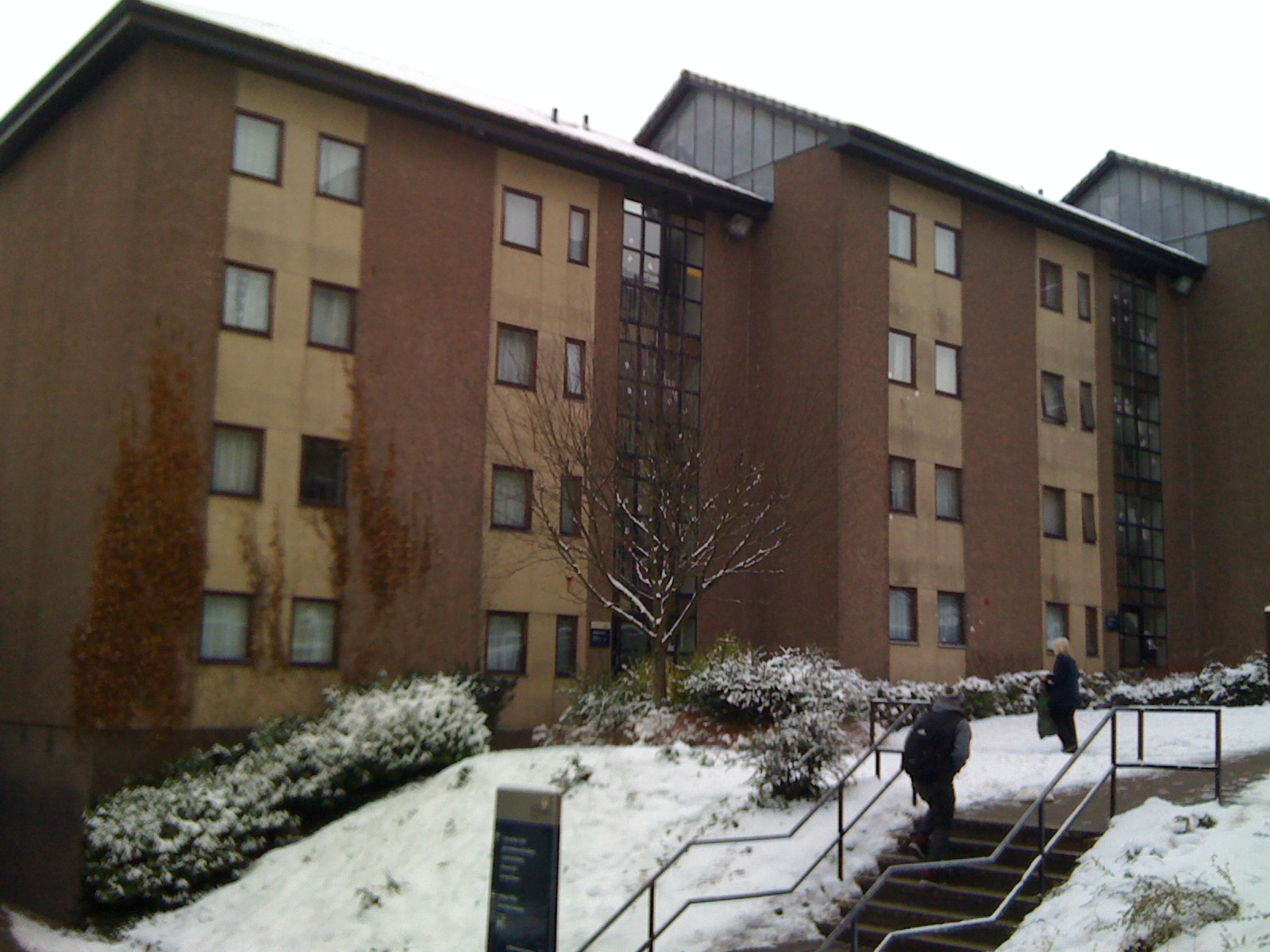
Birkbeck Court

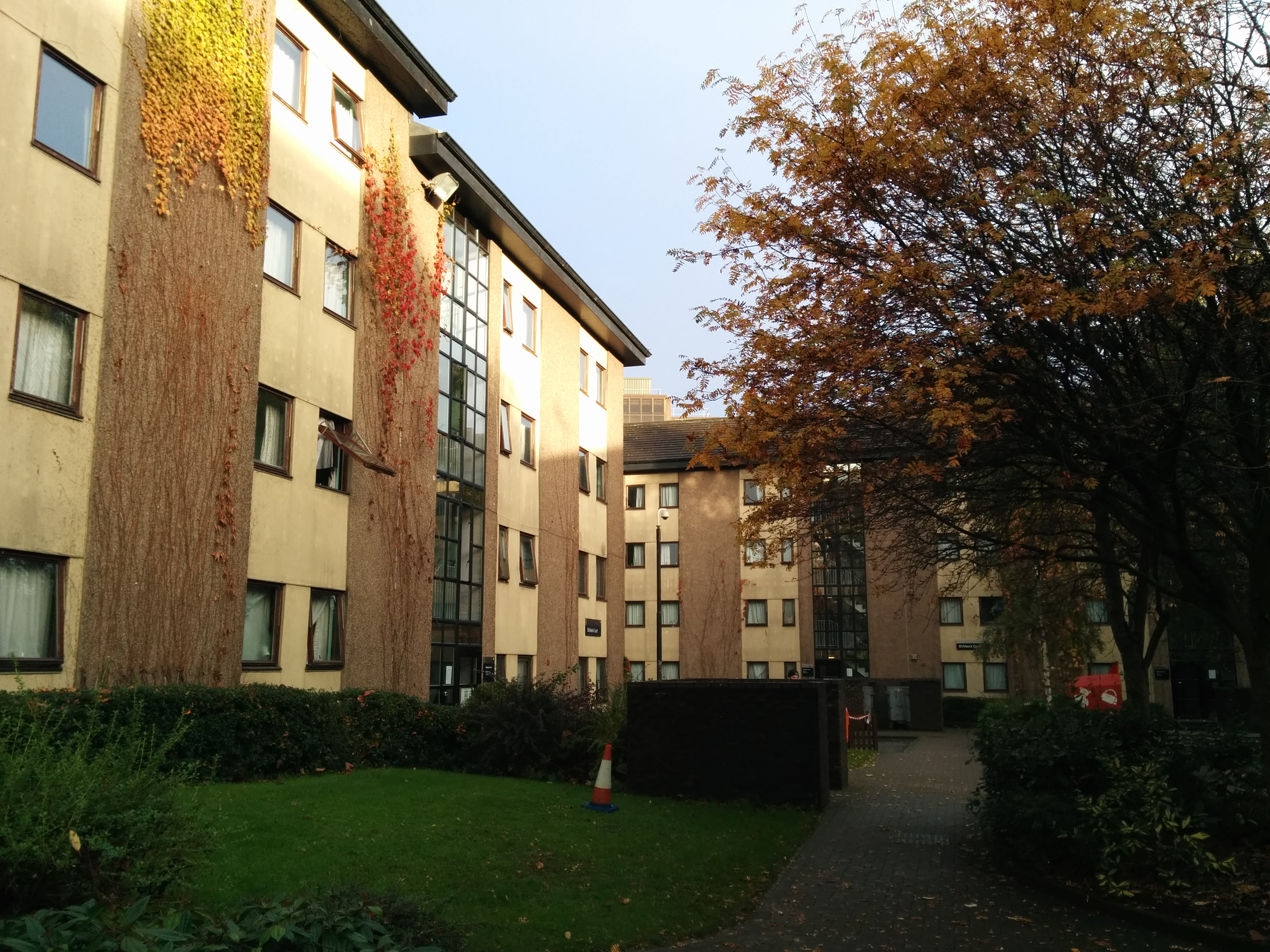
Birkbeck Court

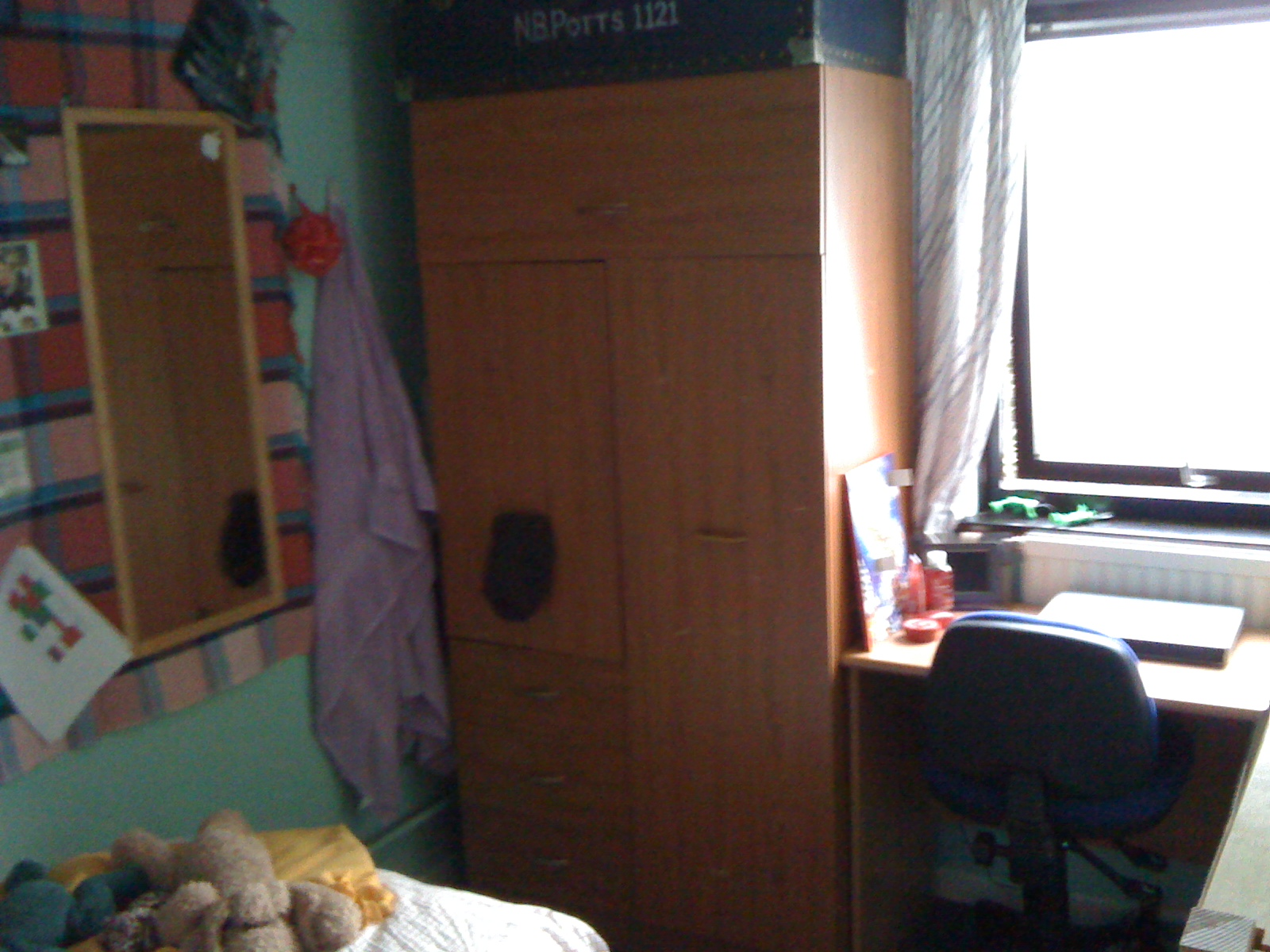
Birkbeck Court Room

Birkbeck court is named after George Birkbeck who studied natural philosophy at the Andersonian Institution, now the University of Strathclyde. It is situated on Cathedral Street in the north west corner of the accommodation block.. Birkbeck court is the oldest and biggest student accommodation housing three hundred and four students. The court is divided into flats each housing six students. Each student has their own small study bedroom but shares kitchen, living and dining room. Other facilities shared include shower room and toilet. Birkbeck court being the largest hall of residence there is a great deal of meeting other student from a wide range of cultures and backgrounds. The court is also near other leisure facilities being very close Glasgow City which is only 5 minutes’ walk. It was constructed between 1972 and 1974.

== The Lord Todd ==
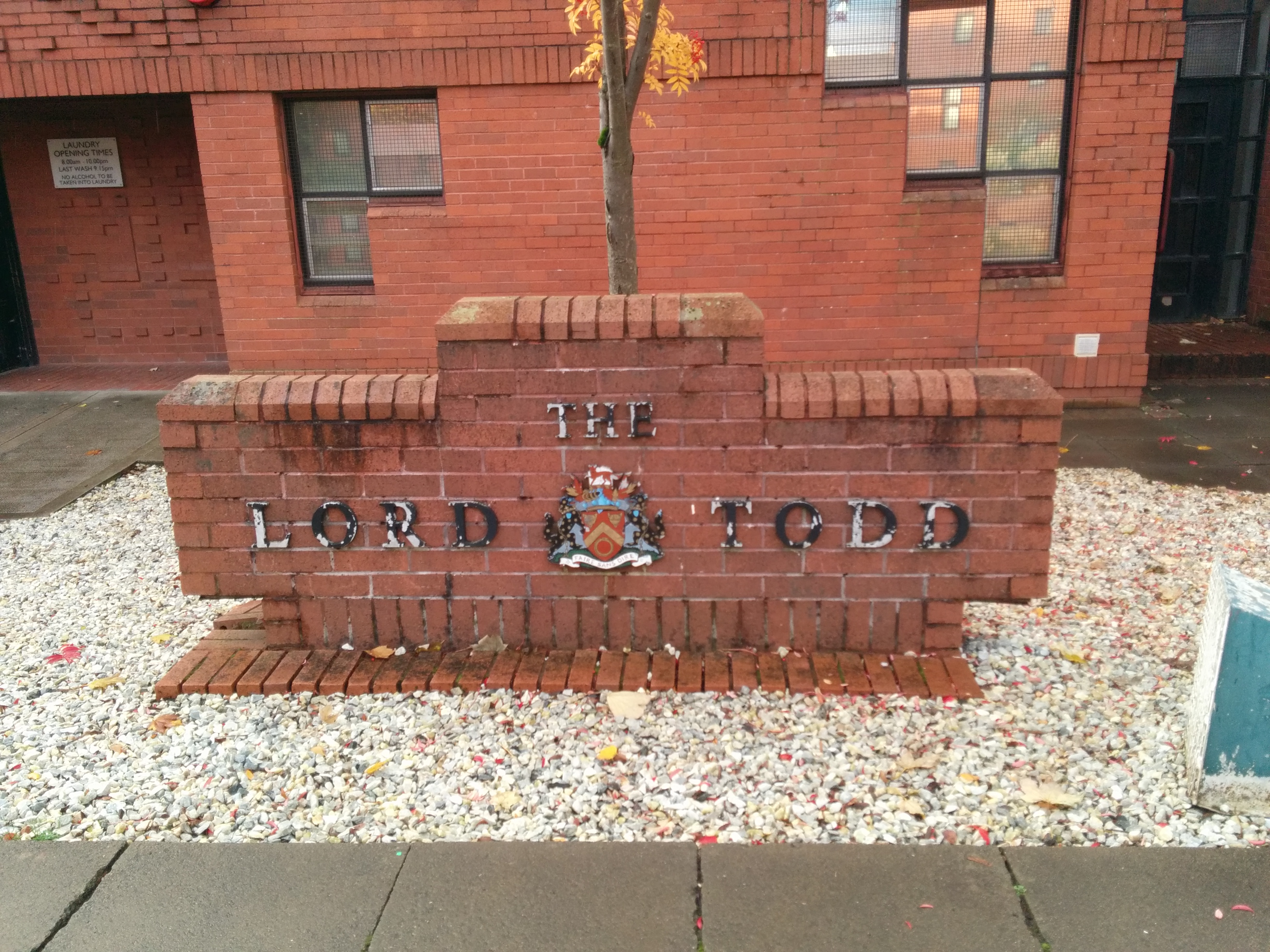
The Lord Todd

The Lord Todd Building resides in the centre of the accommodation block. It serves as the village office, one of the many laundry facilities, a café and local pub. The village office deals with any maintenance or accommodation issues and reroutes all post for the accommodation buildings. The café has recently had a facelift and rebrand to Aroma. Todd's Bar has a more traditional feel than the Student Union, It runs pub quizzes and is a favourite for many students .

== Future and Development plans ==
In 2004, the university embarked on a major £300m, 20-year strategy to renew and remodel the John Anderson Campus, with a view to consolidating its estate. Key objectives were to consolidate activity into a smaller number of buildings, move out of structures that were nearing the end of their lives, and to provide a "front door" for the university – since the historical centrepiece main building of the campus – namely the Royal College – was no longer at its notional centre, nor did it contain any of the central administrative functions; this had long been moved into the McCance Building in the 1960s. The first visible signs of the plan were the disposal of the off-campus Halls of Residence (namely Baird Hall and Clyde Hall), the remodelling of the James Weir Building's ground floor laboratory spaces in 2005–07, and moves to relocate the Faculty of Education from the Jordanhill Campus. Work on the new Technology and Innovation Centre started in 2011, which sought to relocate various Science and Engineering research groups into a single space.

In April 2017, it was announced that a new learning and teaching hub would be created by redeveloping the Architecture and Colville Buildings Both buildings, most notably the listed Architecture Building, had been threatened with demolition. The £41m project will also see the Students Union relocated from its current home on John Street into the Colville Building.
