= University of Strathclyde Students' Association =

Students' union in Glasgow, Scotland

Coordinates: 55.862°N 4.247°W

Strathclyde Students' Union
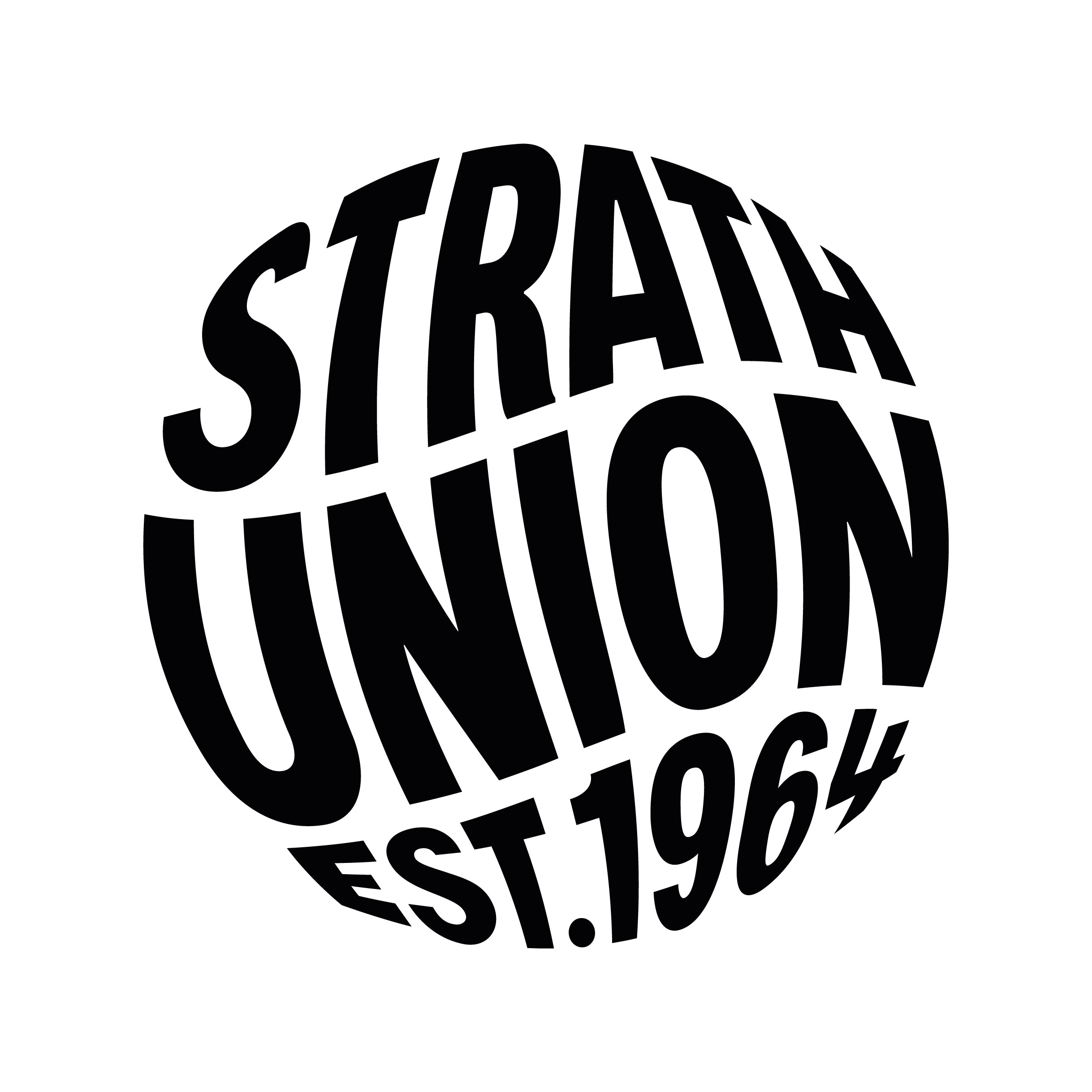
- Motto: Be Part Of It
- Institution: University of Strathclyde
- Location: 51 Richmond Street, Glasgow, Scotland
- Established: 1964
- President: Fraser Brown
- CEO: Morna Simpkins
- Other sabbatical officers: Education President: Lucia Gil Dorta; Sports President: Tilly Galvin; Activities President: Callum Denton; Inclusion President: Jo Fitzpatrick
- Members: c. 22,000 total
- Affiliations: National Union of Students
- Website: https://www.strathunion.com/

Strathclyde Students' Union (Strath Union) is the representative body for students of the University of Strathclyde, Glasgow, Scotland, since its founding in 1964.

== History ==
Founded in 1964, the University of Strathclyde Students' Association was formed when the Students' Associations of the Royal College of Science and Technology and of the Scottish College of Commerce amalgamated. In 1989 it merged with the University of Strathclyde Sports Union.

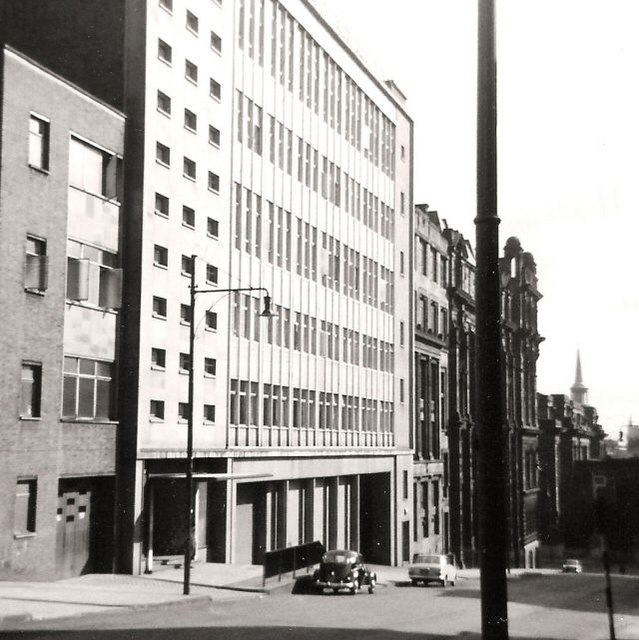
The original Strath Union building at 90 John Street in the late 1970s

The original Students' Union building was located at 90 John Street on the western side of the John Anderson Campus, adjoining onto the rear of the Royal College, James Weir and Thomas Graham buildings. It was opened in 1959, and also incorporated a steam power plant to provide heating for the Royal College and the later additions of the James Weir and Thomas Graham buildings. The 1959 building as originally constructed was a five-storey structure, however, an additional five mezzanine floors were constructed in 1976 as part of a neighbouring extension to the Thermodynamics laboratory of the James Weir Building, effectively creating ten levels in total. Some student groups and welfare services operated by the Association were housed in the St Paul's Building (known as the St Paul's Annexe) directly opposite.

On 20 August 2021 the historic 90 John Street building officially closed in preparation for the Association moving to new accommodation on the campus-based within the Dame Jocelyn Bell Burnell Wing of the Learning and Teaching Building (which was created out of the former Colville Building). The new facility is based across two main levels, with the main entrance at 51 Richmond Street, in space that was originally Civil Engineering laboratories and a car parking area.

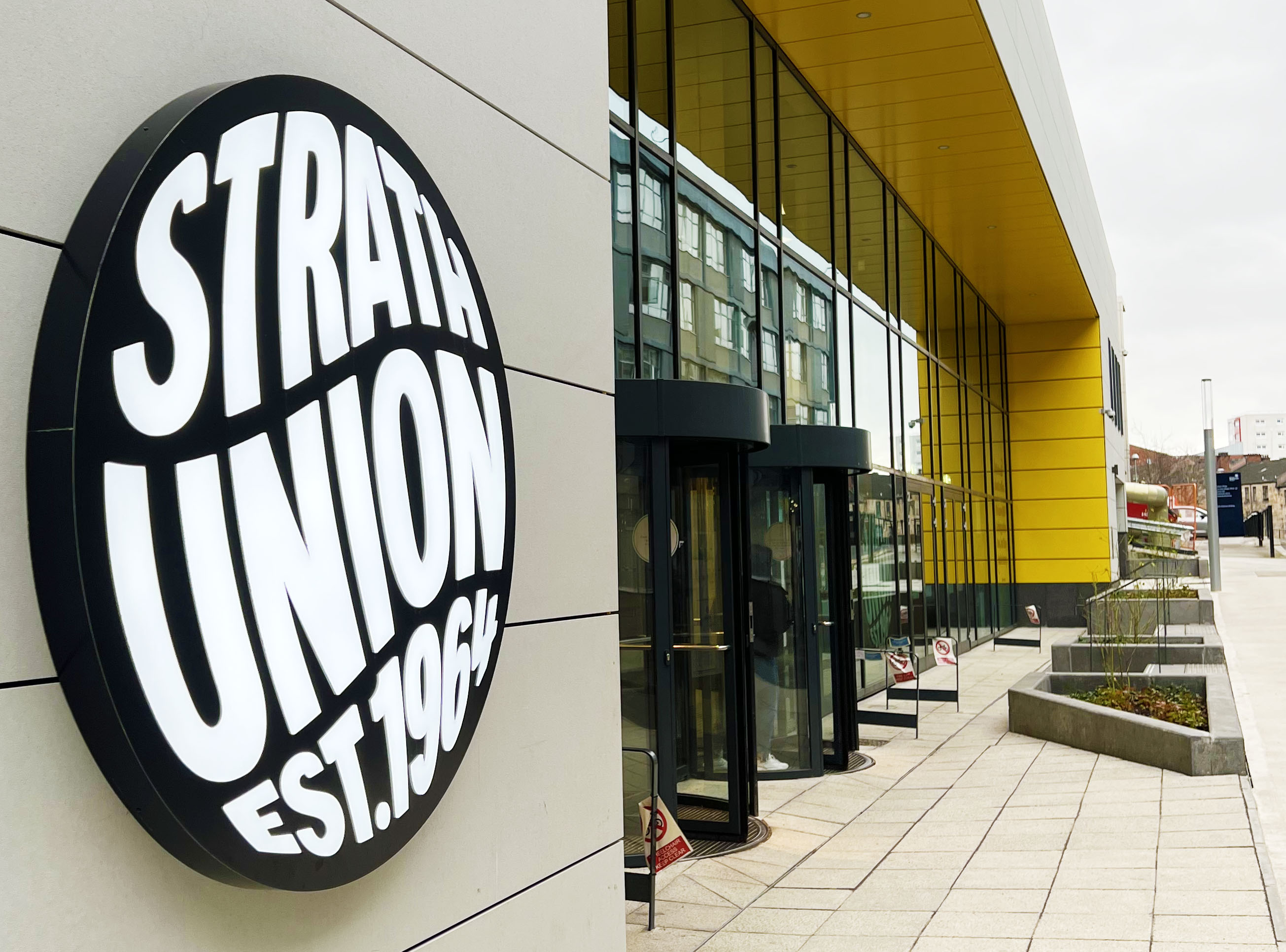
New Strath Union Building

It opened on 10 September 2021 In 2024, it was announced that the old building on John Street would be repurposed as an "innovation hub" – the refurbishment being funded by a £50m donation from a former graduate of the university.

In November 2021, the Association hosted former President of the United States Barack Obama during the 2021 United Nations Climate Change Conference, where he was bestowed an Honorary Life Membership of the Association by then Strath Union President, Benn Rapson. During his visit a meeting of the Obama Foundation was held on Association premises.

In 2024 Strath Union undertook a 'Democracy Review' to change various processes. One of the changes included formally renaming 4 out of 5 sabbatical officer roles from 'Vice President' to 'President', for example, the renaming of 'Vice President Sport' to 'Sports President'. This excludes the President, who of course remains the President of the student union.

== Governance ==
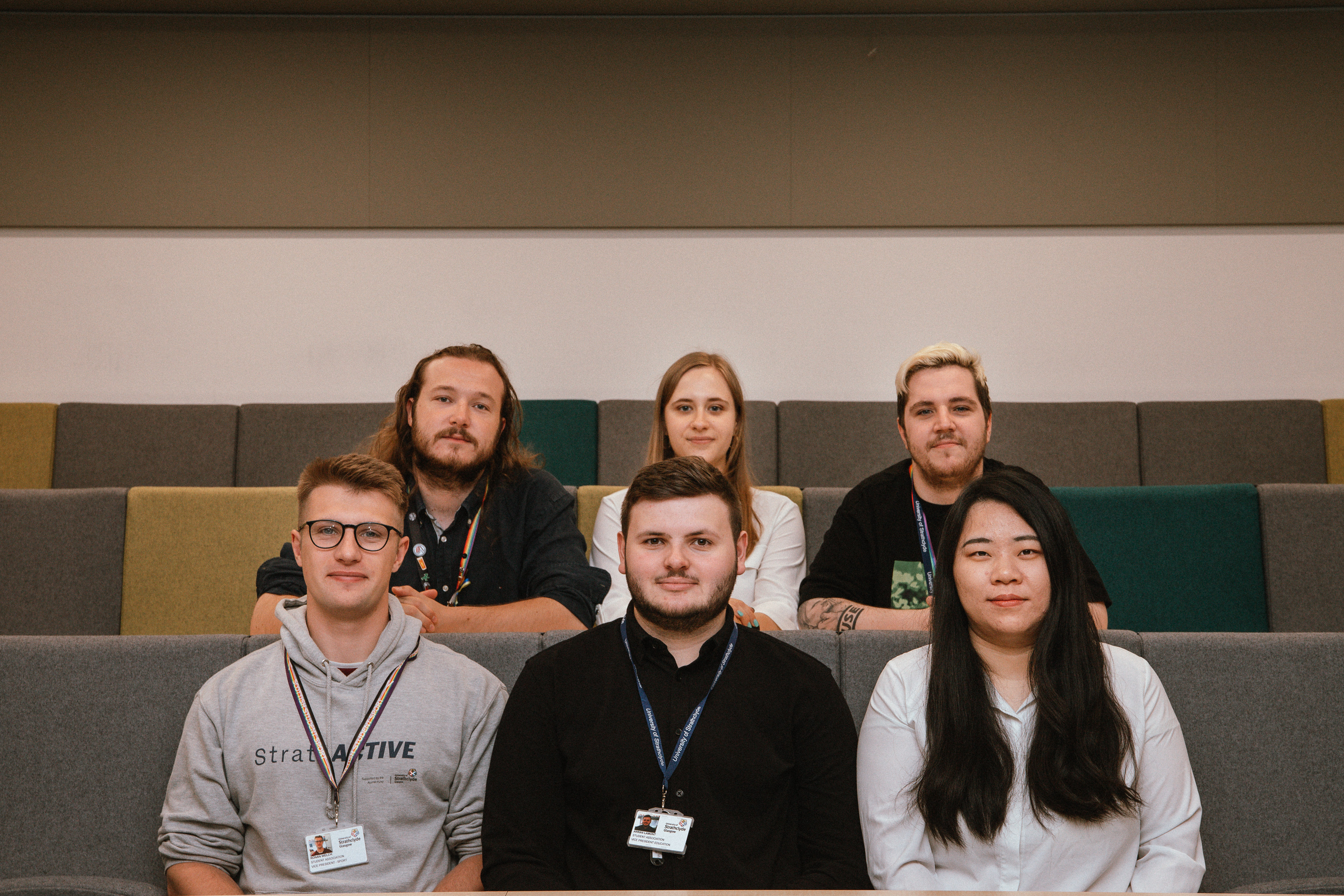
Strath Union Student Execs, 2022/2023

The day-to-day running of the building is done by the executive committee who also serves on the trustee board alongside student volunteers elected by a cross-campus ballot. There are six sabbatical officers: a president and five vice-presidents (covering diversity, education, support, volunteering & development, and sports & wellbeing).

The main policy-making bodies of the Association are the Policy Forums, which meet frequently throughout the year passing policy through to the Policy Council of elected representatives which meets to discuss proposed policy.

Student Reps represent their fellow class colleagues to communicate issues, concerns, and opinions of students to University staff and vice versa.

== Mature Students' Association ==
Mature students (someone who is 21 years of age or older at the start of their course) represent almost 20% of the Strathclyde student population, including undergraduate, postgraduate, and international students. Strathclyde's Students' Union also has a successful Mature Students' Association, located on Level 2 of the Livingstone Tower. Facilities include; Common room, tea/coffee, microwave, toaster, fridges, tuck shop; desktop computers, printer, photocopier; quiet study room, and lockers. The main aims of the Mature Students' Association (MSA) are to provide all mature students with a support network of both friends and fellow students as well as somewhere to study and relax. The MSA is run by Convenor/s and/or committees who are elected yearly by the membership and liaise with the university and the USSA President on behalf of their members.

== Clubs and societies ==
There are over 100 clubs and societies available for students to choose from, each designed to suit the hobbies, courses, beliefs or other interests that students have. A new club or society can be formed if there are at least ten interested members.

Re-Act Theatre, the student theatre group of Strathclyde's Student Union, are known for their performances each semester; which have included Macbeth, One Man, Two Guvnors and The Crucible. Students with an interest in photography, wanting to pursue this passion and meet other photographers join the Strath Photo Club. The Art of Living Strathclyde Society, affiliated with the Art of Living Foundation which is a not-for-profit, educational and humanitarian NGO engaged in stress-management and service initiatives. The LGBT Society runs different events throughout the year including social events, film screenings, political campaigns and trips to local LGBT friendly venues. Events are also organised specifically to coincide with the LGBT History Month. University of Strathclyde Motorsport (USM) compete annually in Formula Student, a competition where students design, build, market, and race a single seater formula style race car.

== Notable presidents ==
Notable past presidents of the University of Strathclyde Students' Association:

- Patrick Grady - 2001/02
- Douglas J. Henderson - 1970/71
