= James Weir Building =

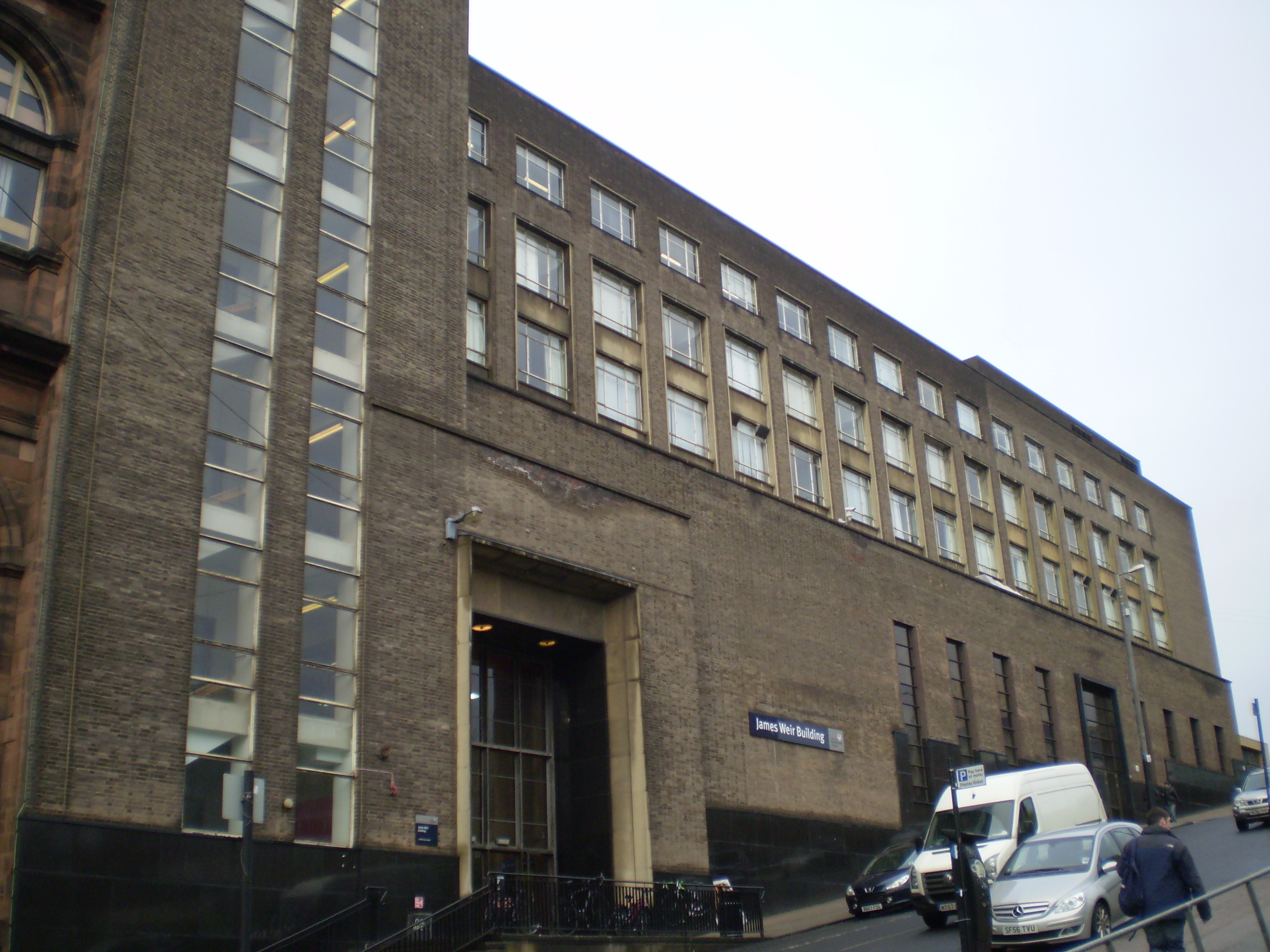
- James Weir Building (east elevation) pictured from Montrose Street
- Interactive map of the James Weir Building area
- Former names: Montrose Street Block

General information
- Status: Completed
- Location: Glasgow, Scotland
- Coordinates: 55°51′43″N 4°14′43″W
- Year built: 1956–1963
- Completed: Phase 1: 1958; Phase 2: 1963
- Renovated: 2004–2014
- Owner: University of Strathclyde

Technical details
- Floor count: 9
- Lifts/elevators: 4

Design and construction
- Architects: Wylie, Shanks & Underwood

The James Weir Building is an academic building in Glasgow City Centre, Scotland, United Kingdom and is part of the University of Strathclyde’s John Anderson Campus, situated between the Townhead and Merchant City districts of the area. It was built in two stages between 1956 and 1963 as an extension to the Royal College Building. It is the third largest building on the John Anderson Campus in terms of overall floor area after the Royal College and the Curran Building. In addition, the stair and lift tower on the south east corner of the building is the second highest structure on the campus after the Livingstone Tower, and is highly visible throughout the eastern side of the city centre.

The building is home to three faculties, The Department of Chemical and Process Engineering, The Department of Design, Manufacture & Engineering Management and The Department of Mechanical & Aerospace Engineering, all of which are part of the Faculty of Engineering. The James Weir Building is situated on Montrose Street, and is surrounded by the Royal College of Science and Technology building, the old Students' Union building and the Thomas Graham Building. It is a 5-minute walk from Queen Street railway station and George Square.

== History and Construction ==
The James Weir Building was designed by Peter Williams of the local architectural firm Shanks, Wylie and Underwood (Williams later designed other prolific academic buildings in the area such as the Met Tower and the Central College of Commerce) and was constructed over the period 1956–1964 in two distinct phases as a north eastern extension to the Royal College Building, which allowed the expanded Royal College to attain the royal charter and become the University of Strathclyde. The building was originally simply called the "Montrose Street Block", but later renamed to the James Weir Building in 1968 after one of the founders of G. & J. Weir Ltd, later known as the Weir Group

To build the extension to the Royal Technical College, significant amounts of funding had to be raised. The college (before it became the University of Strathclyde) sent out documents that a beneficiary could sign, in the process stating how much funding they would put forward to the project. Preparatory work began in 1937 when the College acquired the parcel of land on the northern half of John Street and Montrose Streets from Glasgow Corporation, as well as the former site of the John Street Ironworks (where the Thomas Graham Building now stands). Remaining tenants within tenement housing located on Montrose Street had their tenancies terminated in April 1949 to allow site clearance to take place. An orphanage at 87 Montrose Street was one of the buildings that was removed to make way for the building. The extension was needed to lessen the strain on the college as it was becoming increasingly overcrowded due to an influx of students, 3800 students attending before World War II increased to 6000 after the war. Construction was also delayed due to a steel shortage in the immediate post-war period.

The original design entailed two stair and lift towers at either end, instead of the one that was actually built. There were three elevators in the building, a large one for student use in the stair tower and two staff elevators, one of which was only in use during Phase 1 of the building and was decommissioned when Phase 2 was built. The derelict lift shaft that resulted was only filled in during the 2000s when the building was refurbished. The building was planned to contain engineering laboratories in the basement and ground floor, with lecture rooms, other laboratories and administrative offices on the floor above. The Civil and Mechanical Engineering Departments were moved from the original Royal College building to the extension, this helped free up space, although the Civil Engineering discipline later moved into the new Colville Building in 1967.

The original estimated cost of the complete building was £750,000. Governors wished to proceed quickly with the first stage of development which was estimated to cost £445,000, towards which Government grants amounting to £334,000 had already been advised. The Governors of the college would have to raise £350,000 on their own initiative to complete, equip the building and to provide a moderate endowment for research. The Governors launched their appeal to their public and private supporters. The response to the appeal for funding rose just over £360,000. The building was constructed in two distinct phases; the southern two-thirds of the building was constructed between 1956 and 1958; the remaining third was constructed between 1960 and 1962 in tandem with the new Chemistry Block (Thomas Graham Building) – and the join between the two sections of the structure is still highly evident over 60 years later. Before the 2014 refurbishment, the differences between the two sections of the building were evident inside, with slightly different fixtures and fittings.

A further extension in 1976 was built, which extended the thermodynamics laboratory, onto which an extension block to the Students' Union Building was also added. Redevelopment plans have been proposed which would convert the laboratory into a walkthrough atrium which would open a direct pedestrian route between Montrose Street and John Street (on old maps of Glasgow this was in fact a continuation of Martha Street) – a link that was severed when the building was constructed in the late 1950s.

In the BBC Scotland drama Sea of Souls, the James Weir Building was used to shoot the fictitious "Murray Thompson Building" and was used extensively throughout the program.

== James Weir Fire ==
At 7:16 pm on Tuesday 7 February 2012 a fire broke out in the James Weir building of Strathclyde University, and is believed to have started on the third floor of the building. All of the buildings neighbouring the James Weir building were evacuated including the Strathclyde University's Student Union where almost 150 students were evacuated as a precautionary measure. Montrose Street was closed to all traffic between Cathedral Street and George Street. It took four fire engines and eight pumps to calm the blaze. The fire took place in the chemical engineering department and was complicated by the presence of hazardous materials. Strathclyde Fire and Rescue Service were able to extinguish the fire by 23:40 and it was reported that no one was injured.

=== Aftermath of the fire ===
After the fire some classes have been forced to relocate to nearby buildings including the International Christian College (now demolished) and Vertigo in the Student Union. Some classes even had to be held in the local multiplex cinema. However few classes will be held here, as it is going to cost £44,482 for around 23 hours of teaching. This cost includes costs of temporary lighting being installed, the cinema was hired as without the James Weir building the university did not have anywhere else that could accommodate 650+ students at once. The decision to hire the venue was made as opposed to splitting the students up into several smaller rooms as the university felt it would provide the students with the best learning experience. It is only postgraduate students that will be using the multiplex as replacement. The damage to the James Weir Building will cost around £28 million to repair (however this figure also includes renovations to various buildings across the university campus). The main replacement building is the University of Strathclyde Students' Association (USSA). There have been no reported injuries from the fire, and repairs were finished in autumn of 2014.

== Inside the Building ==
=== After the fire ===
The original building code for the James Weir building was "M" (for Montrose Street Block), however following the 2014 refurbishment both the building code was changed to "JW", and the floors were renumbered.

The building consists of 8 floors that are occupied with many laboratories, lecture rooms and on the upper floors there are several offices. The numbers in brackets are the post-2014 floor designations.

- Sixth Floor (Level 8): Main offices for the Department of Mechanical Engineering. Twenty small staff rooms and seven central offices.
- Fifth Floor (Level 7): Main offices for the Department of Design, Manufacture and Engineering Management. Eight drawing and design offices with drawing staff and model store rooms.
- Fourth Floor (Level 6): Devoted entirely to teaching spaces with various classrooms and lecture theatres; the largest specially fitted for more general lectures and society meetings.
- Third Floor (Level 5): Mining Engineering Department
- Second Floor (Level 4): Fourteen rooms used as lecture rooms, laboratories and research rooms.
- First Floor (Level 3): Eight laboratories, three junior and five senior. Link to Level 6 of the Royal College Building.
- Mezzanine Floor Several of the ground floor laboratories have mezzanines housing offices, and a further mezzanine exists on the south staircase to access Level 5 of the Royal College Building.
- Ground Floor (Level 2): Eight laboratories. Link to Level 4 of the Royal College Building.
- Basement (Level 1): Building Services, and link corridor to Level 3 of the Royal College Building.

== Restoration and Development ==
In 2000, the lecture floor on Level 4 received a comprehensive redevelopment which saw the first of the University's Interactive Teaching Clusters built. All lecture rooms were completely rebuilt with new lighting and modern projection equipment. Between 2004 and the present, the James Weir Building has had a recent major refurbishment (worth over a million pounds) on levels 1 and 2. Six of the ground floor laboratories were redeveloped, with the removal of obsolete machinery and equipment allowing extra mezzanine space to be constructed within. At the same time the building was upgraded to modern fire regulations, with additional fire doors installed in corridors and staircases.

The top priority for the Faculty of Engineering is to accommodate Civil Engineering and Architecture in the James Weir Building. Architecture for example now occupies Level 3 (the old First floor) and Civils now occupy the old laboratory spaces on Level 2 (Ground) – thus allowing the Colville and Architecture Buildings be redeveloped into a central teaching hub – this project was completed in September 2021.

However the James Weir Building will not always be the centre of Engineering, as "The new technology and innovation centre and the Engineering and Physical Sciences Quarter in the west of the campus are interdependent and is anticipated that staff from some areas of Engineering and Physical Sciences will move into the new centre."
