= Premature =

Premature may refer to:

- Premature (2014 film), an American comedy film
- Premature (2019 film), an American romantic drama film
- PREMature, a 2015 British television drama miniseries

== See also ==
- Premature aging, of an organism
- Premature birth, a preterm baby birth
- Premature ejaculation, a condition in which a man ejaculates earlier than he or his partner would like him to
- Adult premature aging syndrome, a disease with the appearance of premature aging
- Premature Burial, a horror short story by American writer Edgar Allan Poe, published in 1844.
