= Graham Hills Building =

University building in Glasgow, Scotland

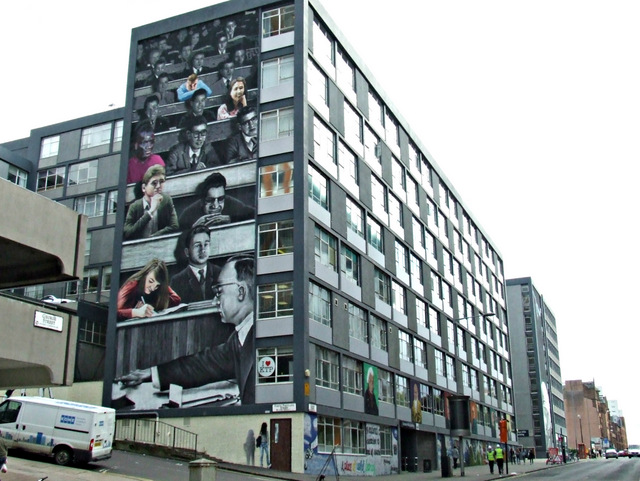
- The south elevation of the building, showing the "Strathclyde Wonderwall" wall murals
- Former names: Marland House

General information
- Type: Office (1959–1987); Academic (1987–)
- Architectural style: Modernist
- Location: 40–50 George Street, Glasgow
- Year built: 1957–1959
- Opened: 1959
- Cost: £1m
- Owner: General Post Office / BT Group (1959–1987); University of Strathclyde (1987–present)

Technical details
- Floor count: 9
- Lifts/elevators: 9

Design and construction
- Architecture firm: Arthur Swift & Partners

The Graham Hills Building is a major building on Strathclyde University's John Anderson Campus, located in Glasgow, Scotland. The structure, originally known as Marland House, was completed in 1959 by the General Post Office (GPO) and was acquired by the university from the GPO's successor – British Telecom (BT) in 1987.

The building is best known for the "Strathclyde Wonderwall", the largest wall mural in the city and was briefly the largest in the UK following its completion in 2014.

In 1991 it was renamed for the outgoing principal Sir Graham Hills who retired that year.

== History of Graham Hills ==
Marland House was designed by the Edinburgh architectural firm Arthur Swift and Partners and was built at a cost of £1m. Originally designed as office complex primarily for the Telephones division of the GPO, it won a Civic Trust Design Award in 1960. The Owners (Capital & Counties Property Company) named it Marland House, derived from a pub known as Marland Bar, which stood adjacent to the site prior to the slum clearances of the 1950s. (The pub itself was later renamed "The Right Half" and was eventually closed and demolished in the 1990s) The building was mainly occupied and used by the clerical & engineering teams of the organization along with other Government Departments such as the DSS, Inland Revenue and Pneumoconiosis Board, with a front counter/sales office enabling Post Office Telecoms/BT customers to conduct business during daytime for many years.

By the early 1980s, Post Office Telecommunications was now British Telecom (BT) and the new company sought to leave many of its older buildings. However, the original 42-year lease on Marland House was signed in Scotland making it subject to Scots Law and as a result, omitting to contain a statement that it was executed under English Law meant that the initially quoted rental rates remained secured for the entire period of the lease with no option for increasing them. As the structure deteriorated over time, the owners' financial responsibilities compared to the rental they were receiving became a burden and it was eventually sold to BT in advance of the maturity of the lease. The University of Strathclyde had long expressed its desire to acquire the building to support its own campus expansion plans, and pressed forward and acquired the building from BT, which was bought for a nominal £1 on the condition that the University would take over the maintenance and repair of the structure, and that BT was allowed to occupy parts of it for another five years until they could move out completely, while the university converted it into an academic building.

The building was formally renamed after Sir Graham Hills in 1991, at the end of his tenure as Principal and Vice Chancellor. The conversion process lasted nearly ten years, with some BT staff still occupying parts of the East Wing (40 George Street) until 1992–93.

== General Characteristics ==
The building itself is divided into four independent, unconnected wings which forces students to leave and re-enter the building from another side to access one of the other wings. – this layout dated back to the Marland House era when non-GPO/BT tenants of the building needed to be segregated from the rest. There is a central circulation space in the heart of the building which joined all four wings together, which was taken out of use for many years. The primary use of the building is for use in tutorials due to the large number of small rooms which are ideal for small groups of students. The small rooms are able to seat around 10 – 15 students which encourages learning in group and allows for more individual attention from tutors. That being said, several lectures of moderate student sizes are being held in The Graham Hills building, most notably ones organized by the faculty of Business and Administration. The designated lecture halls in Graham Hills can hold up to three hundred students each. The building also contains several computer labs in which many online tests are held and provides facilities for students to complete assignments which require the use of computers. The labs are often used by the business school to hold its first year tests.

The building was originally constructed with eight lifts serving all nine levels, one for each of the Richmond Street and 50 George Street wings, two serving the east wing (40 George Street) and a group of four in the centre of the building which serve all wings. The building is not for any department in particular, instead it is used by a variety of academic service departments with labs for electrical engineers as well as computer labs for computer science students. Psychology students have their own floor as well for use in tutorials and lectures.

Originally upon its acquisition from BT, room numbers for the Graham Hills Building used the building code "P" on university timetables (the "P" standing for 'Post Office Building' – reflecting its original use), however following the campus refurbishment of the 2010s, the more logical "GH" code is used instead.

== Strathclyde Wonderwall ==
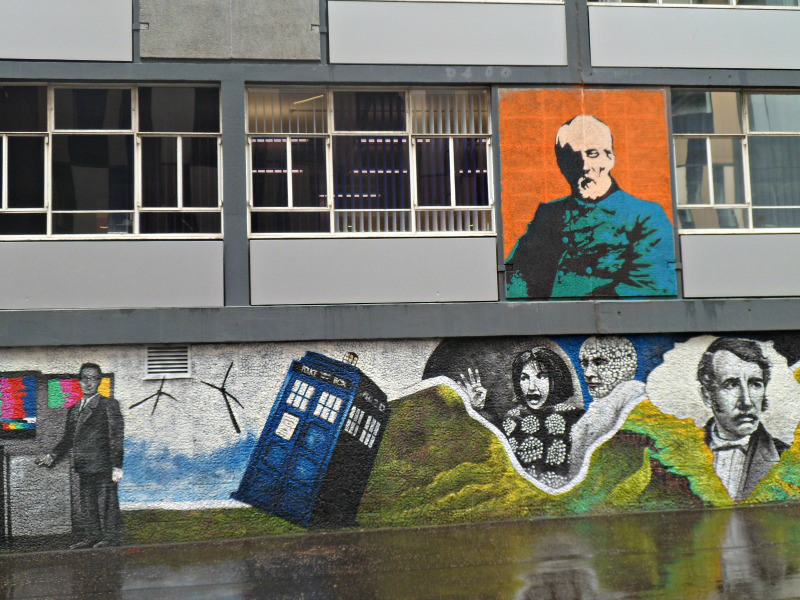
Strath Wonderwall

On the exterior of the building are various murals spray-painted (in the form of graffiti) by the popular local artists Rogue One and Ejek. These contain an artwork of a lecture hall (based on a historical photograph taken inside the Royal College Building) on the western gable at the George Street and North Portland Street. The mural has a mixture of colour and black and white imagery; as if to convey the combination of older class and modern studying.

Along with the murals there is also the famous Strath wonder wall which sports its own hashtag #Strathwonderwall to encourage students and other people to post their photos on social media sites. The wall contains paintings of figures such as Scottish engineer – John Logie Baird, the T.A.R.D.I.S from the popular British television series Doctor Who and even an illustration Frankenstein's Monster. The wall serves as a pleasant reminder for Glasgow's colourful and artistic culture. In recent times a mural was painted depicting the land-ship which was once situated on the roof of what was at the time, The School of Navigation. It is expected that this new mural was created to show of part of the universities history in time for the vast number of tourists that would be visiting Glasgow for the Commonwealth Games. On another side of the building is a mural of a Dansken equatorial telescope which is a tribute to the nautical telescope that used to be on the top floor in what was the Royal Technical College ^{[5]}.

Several plans have been made to expand the collection of artworks on the other sides of the building as well, since for the time being the only walls that are decorated are the ones facing the main area of George Street and the entrance to the building.

== Facilities, services, offices ==
There are several facilities, services and offices occupying the halls of Graham Hills, concerning (among others) various fields of studies and research. A considerable number of Departments also host their Department Offices within the walls of this building. If one was to categorize this array of facilities, it can be said they're divided in groups of Study Centers (or Teaching Rooms), Service information offices and Department offices.

A brief mapping of what is available in Graham Hills follows:

Level 1: Information Technology Services.

Level 2: Centre for Academic Practice, West of Scotland KTP Centre, 3Ls Student Common Room, Capella Nova, Centre for Lifelong Learning, Security Office, restrooms.

Level 3: Research and Innovation rooms, Senior Studies Institute, Learning in Later Life Students Association Office, restrooms.

Level 4: Policy Unit, Car Park, Disability Service, International and Graduate Office, Schools & Colleges Liaison Service, Student Counselling, restrooms.

Level 5: Geography & Sociology (Department Office), Teaching Rooms, Psychology (Department Office), restrooms.

Level 6: David Livingstone Centre for Sustainability, Computer Rooms for Central Teaching, Human Resources Teaching Room, Learning Services Teaching Room, Psychology (Department Office), several other teaching rooms, restrooms.

Level 7: Electronic and Electrical Engineering faculties, Law teaching rooms, restrooms, Center for Lifelong Learning (Department Office), Languages for Business Office, Scottish Centre for Occupational Health and Safety, restrooms.

Level 8: Faculty of S.B.S, Human Resource Management (Department Office), Internal Audit, Management Science, Safety Services, teaching rooms, Unison, restrooms.

Level 9: Strathclyde Science and Technology Forum, Human Resource Management, European Policies Research Centre.

The building of Graham Hills hosts the largest number of offices in terms of departmental variety throughout the entire campus.

== Reception ==
Contrary to popular belief, and despite the university's plans to abandon the building, students of the University of Strathclyde find Graham Hills among the most favorable buildings to have in their curriculum and their daily schedules. However some have argued that the building is rather confusing to navigate and often quite dark. A big percentage of them agree that Graham Hills is a building worth keeping as part of the campus, and that its location and small classrooms offer a more personalized style of learning. Students have however, indicated that they would welcome refurbishment.

What is also worth mentioning is that due to Graham Hill's positioning in the campus, it is the students' route of convenience on rainy days, when walking uphill to the rest of the buildings can be a tedious process. Instead, a good number of students opt to use the general entrance of the building at 40 George Street, and then walk across the car park into the Richmond Street wing, and exit in front of the Student's Union within the new Learning and Teaching Hub.
