= Andersonian Library =

Library in Glasgow, Scotland

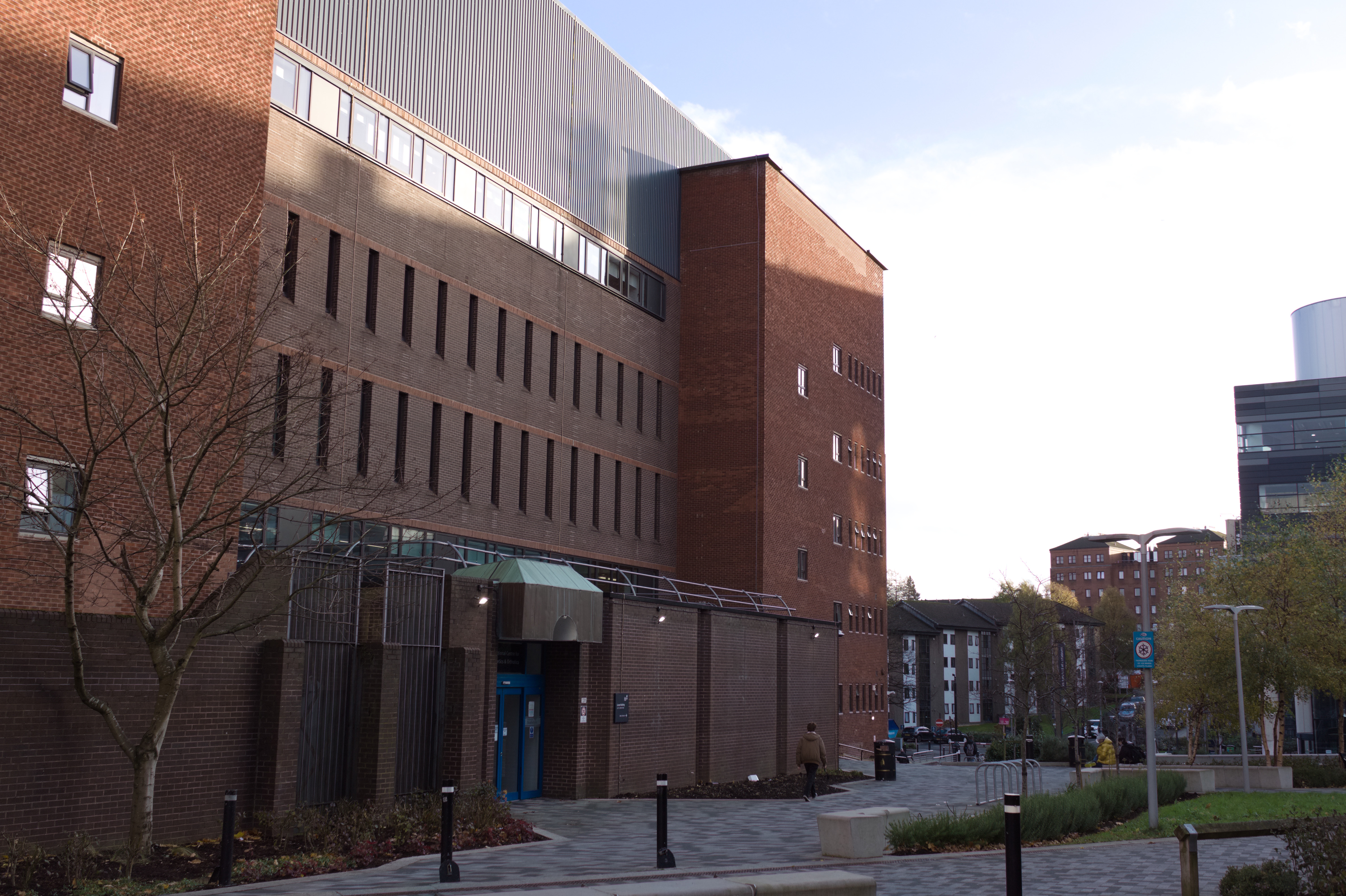
- The Curran Building, which has been the home of the Andersonian Library since 1980.
- 55°51′48.38″N 4°14′26.29″W
- Location: University of Strathclyde (Curran Building) 101 St. James Road, Glasgow G4 0NS, Scotland
- Type: Academic Library (Reference and Lending)
- Established: 1796

Collection
- Items collected: Books, manuscripts, journals and electronic resources
- Size: Over 1,000,000 volumes

Access and use
- Access requirements: Staff, students, and alumni of the University of Strathclyde
- Members: ~15,000

Other information
- Website: The Andersonian Library

The Andersonian Library is the university library of the University of Strathclyde in Glasgow, Scotland. Established in 1796, it is one of the largest of its type in Scotland.

Access is restricted to Strathclyde student and other library membership card holders, retired staff and corporate members.

== History ==
The Andersonian was formed in 1796 on the death of John Anderson when he bequeathed his collection, which consisted of over 2000 volumes. This is what formed the nucleus of the library. The Andersonian was originally housed within the buildings of Andersons Institution on George Street, before being relocated to the Royal College Building upon its opening in 1912. The library moved to the new McCance Building designed by Ralph Covell on Richmond Street in 1964 shortly before the Royal College gained its Charter to become the University of Strathclyde.

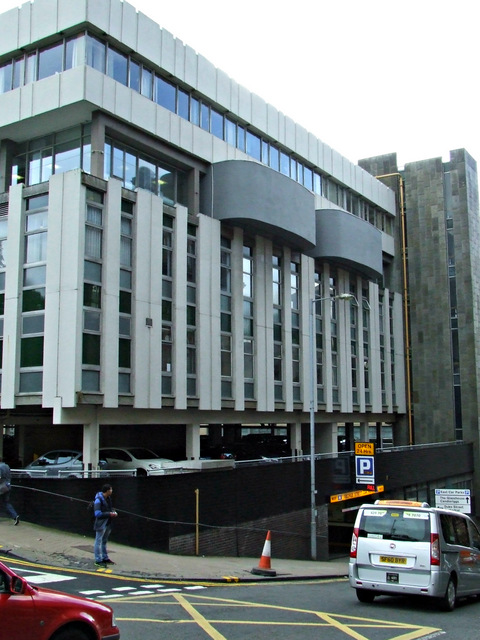
The McCance Building, the home of the library from 1964 to 1980

But by the early 1970s the library was projected to soon outgrow the McCance Building, and by 1973 agreement had been reached by the University to purchase the former printing works of William Collins, Sons on Cathedral Street. The newest building on this site was a giant warehouse and printing press building that was originally constructed in 1961, and while much of the rest of the Collins estate was demolished by the University, work began in 1979 on converting this structure into the third home of the Library. The former library area in the McCance Building became the home for Registry and main administrative functions of the university.

The building itself is named after Sir Samuel Curran, the Principal who had oversaw the University's foundation and growth from the former Royal College and served between 1964 and 1980. The current location into which the Andersonian moved in 1980 for the 1980–81 academic year – the new library was officially opened the following year. The building's naming took place shortly before Curran's retiral and his succession by Sir Graham Hills in 1981, who would lead Strathclyde through the next decade.

John Anderson, a Professor of Natural Philosophy at Glasgow University, left his personal library of 1,500 volumes which formed the basis of the Andersonian Library's historical and nurtured items. Two other important collections were added to the library's stock in the following century: 500 volumes from the library of Alexander Laing, a Professor of Mathematics at Anderson's University, and 1,400 volumes from James Young of Kelly and Durris, who was President of Anderson's College. The library of the Royal College had strong collections in the fields of applied sciences and technology.

During Summer 2012 the first phase of the University Library redevelopment project was completed. In recent years the floors of the Library were upgraded. During June 2012 the Jordanhill Library was closed and stock and services were integrated into this Library on the John Anderson campus. This project brought all Library and information services into a single location. There are more group study areas and improved silent study spaces. Digital collections are continually being enhanced, opening hours are being increased and heating, lighting and ventilation have all been upgraded.

== Services ==
The Andersonian Library is split up into several different zones, spread over 5 levels. Levels 1, 4 and 5 are designated for silent study. Level 3 is the entrance floor and hosts the Library and IT helpdesk as well as the majority of the library's computers, and is designated a 'quiet' study area. Level 2 is the group discussion floor and has a number of facilities for group study, such as bookable rooms and large tables. A new group study area opened in 2014 as part of the library's ongoing renovation. There are small group study rooms, discussion areas, an Assistive Technologies room and Education Resources Centre for the university's education students.

The Library provides free internet access through the desktop computers, eduroam Wi-Fi, or through a handful of hardwired Ethernet ports.

The library's 'SUPrimo' catalogue search interface allows students and staff to search the library's database to find print or electronic copies of books which the library keeps in stock. SUPrimo also allows users to reserve books and requisition material from storage.

The entrance foyer houses a take-away coffee kiosk, and a branch of the university-run Nourish café.

For most of the term time the library is open between 07:00 and 00:00 on weekdays, and from 09:00 to 21:00 on Saturdays and Sundays. Enquiries services are staffed between 08:30 and 20:30 during the week and from 12:00 until 17:00 at weekends.

During examination periods the library is open 24 hours a day, seven days a week.

== Collections ==
The library holds around 3,200 volumes from John Anderson, Alexander Laing and James Young collectively, all from a period between 1490 and the end of the 19th century. There is also one incunable of note. German and Latin imprints are also available within the library and hold a modest 20 per cent and 25 per cent respectively.

The Scottish Mountaineering Club (established in 1889) has also deposited books within the library. Throughout the years, members, authors and publishers have all donated books to the collection making most publications, journals and famous guidebooks available within the library. This collection is on deposit from The Scottish Mountaineering though, meaning at any-point a member of the club can borrow items from the collections (on production of a club membership card).

One of the more interesting pieces of work within the library's special collections is the James Young Collection; Young was an industrial chemist and originator of the paraffin and shale oil industry in Scotland. The collection contains books and manuscripts on alchemy and early science dating from the 15th to the 19th century and is listed in a printed bibliography, Bibliotheca Chemica (Glasgow, 1906) by John Ferguson.

The library is home to many rare books (many with fewer than three copies in existence); but these books are not available for loan. The use of these books is restricted to within the library. Among other notable works are some by Agrippa Von Nettesheim and a volume by the grammarian Joannes Claius on rural economy.

The Andersonian Library also contains a "Strathclyde Collections" section which was created to conserve as complete a record as possible of publications relating to the University. It contains works by members of staff, official publications of the University, its departments and faculties and publications about the university.

== Building layout ==
Floor 1	Books: Serials 0–999 (except Law).; Bibliographies.; Government Publications including Scottish Parliament.; Royal Scottish Geographical Society Collection.; Closed Access Collections: Dewey Book Store.; Company Reports Collection.; Key Note Reports.; Level 1 is for silent study.
Floor 2	Contains a variety of group discussion space including: 4 bookable group discussion rooms and 12 group study clusters.; Enhanced assistive technologies facilities.; Photocopying/Printing facilities.; Historic articles.
Floor 3	Main entrance: IT Help desk.; Lending Services (Borrowing and Return; Short Loans Collection; Inter-library Loans).; Reference and Information inquiry point.; IT sales desk.; Facilities include: PCs and scanners (located in the main PC area).; Photocopying facilities.; John Anderson Meeting Room.; Liblabs 1 and 2.; Photocopying and Printing card dispensers.; Self-issue and Self-return terminals.
Floor 4	Subjects included on this floor are: Applied Sciences; Biological Sciences; Building; Business; Chemistry; Computing; Criminology; Earth Sciences; Economics; Education; Engineering; Hotel Studies; Language; Leisure & Tourism; Library and Information Science; Management; Marketing; Pharmaceutical Science; Philosophy; Physical Sciences; Politics; Psychology; Public Administration; Religion; Social Sciences; Technology. Reference Collection for all subjects located on this level. Services: Enquiry point for Business, Engineering and Science.; Facilities: PC and laptop area with printing and scanning capabilities.; Large Discussion Room – for group work and study.; Seminar Room 4.
Floor 5	Subjects included on this floor are: Arts and Architecture; Children's collection; Geography; History; Humanities; Literature; Law; Maps and Atlases; Media & Music collection; Planning. Services: Enquiry point for Humanities, Arts & Social Sciences, including Law.; Archives & Special Collections reading room and service.; Facilities: PC and laptop area with printing and scanning capabilities.; Large Discussion Room – for group work and study.; Small bookable Group Study Room.; Seminar Room 5
