= Dundee Law School =

Law school in Dundee, Scotland

Coordinates: 56.457°N 2.978°W

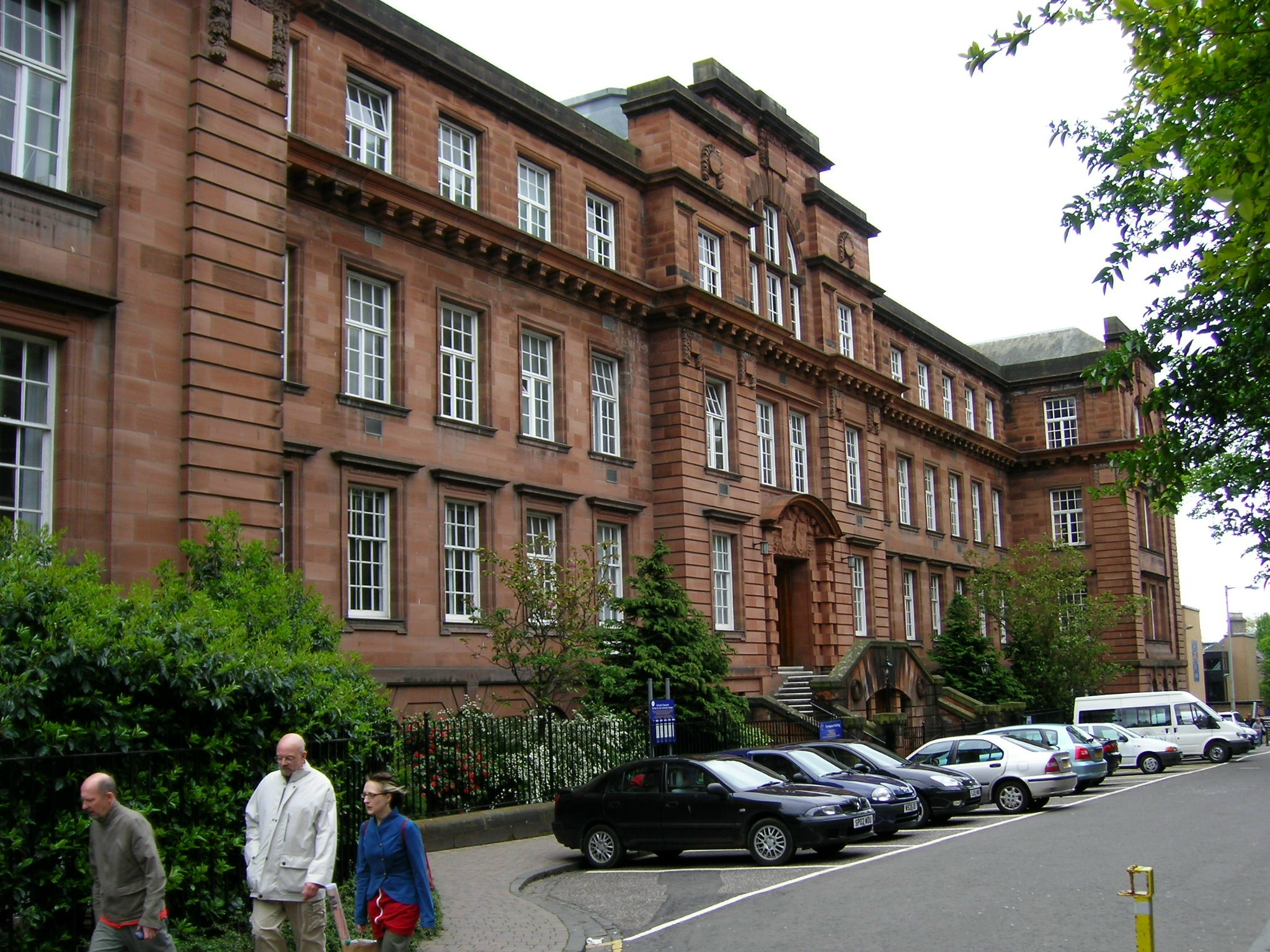
- The Scrymgeour Building
- Type: Law school
- Established: 1967 - school of independent university 1954 - faculty of Queen's College, St Andrews; 1899 - faculty of University College Dundee
- Affiliations: University of Dundee
- Head of Division: Yvonne Evans
- Faculty: 32 (2026)
- Students: 810 (2024/25)
- Location: Dundee, Scotland, UK
- Website: www.dundee.ac.uk/law

The Dundee Law School is the law school of the University of Dundee in Scotland. It provides undergraduate and postgraduate teaching in Scots and English law, permitting students to qualify into all three United Kingdom legal jurisdictions. The law school traces its roots to the University of St. Andrews, and is based in the Scrymgeour Building—named for Henry Scrymgeour, a 16th-century legal philosopher from Dundee—while the Law Library is based in the libraries building, both on the university's main campus. The Law School is part of the wider School of Social Sciences, Humanities and Law at Dundee.

The Times and The Sunday Times ranked Dundee 8th in the UK for Law in their 2027 league table. The Guardian's University Guide 2027 ranked Dundee Law School 1st in Scotland and 9th in the UK.

== History ==
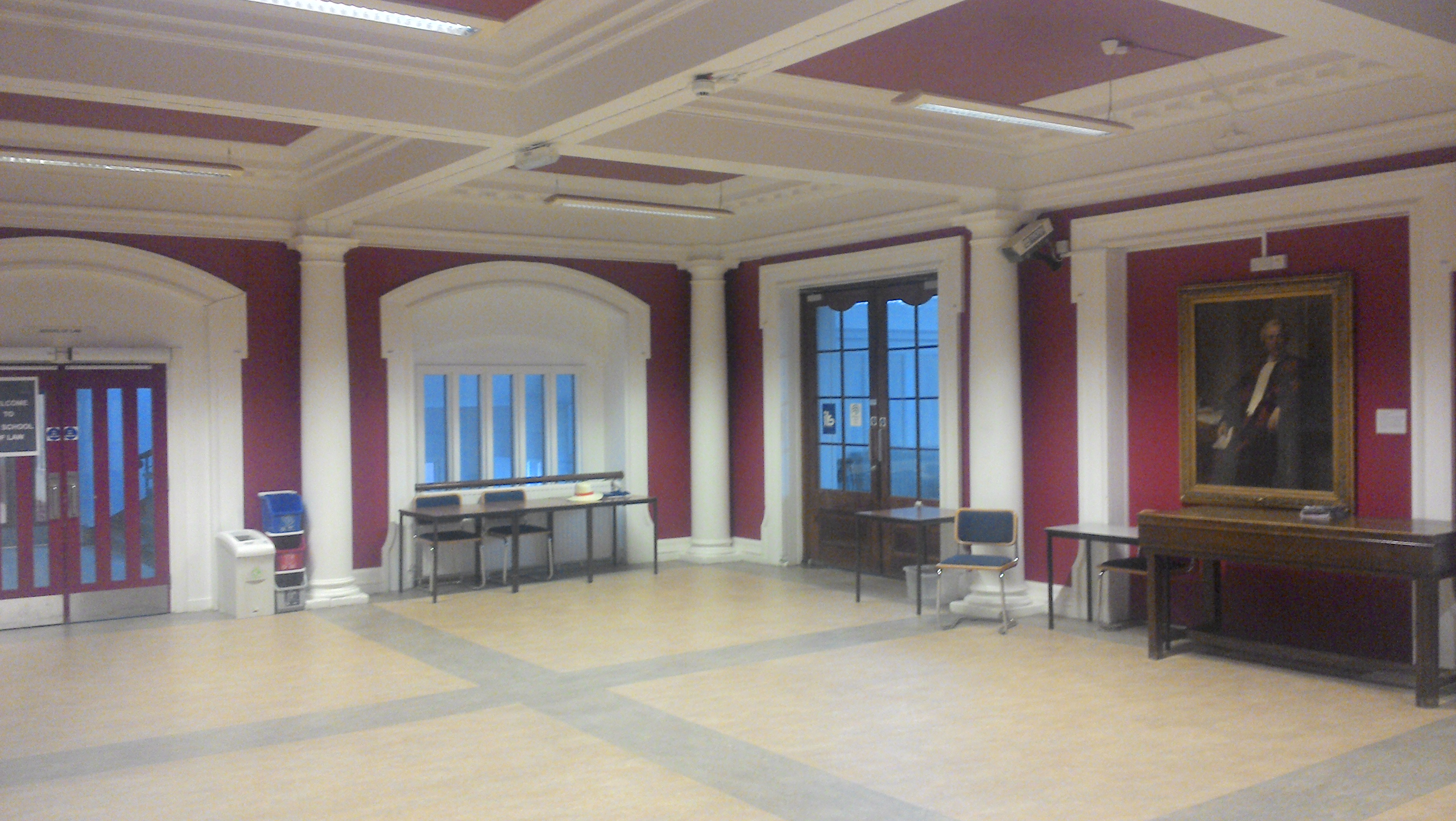
The lobby of the Scrymgeour Building

The origins of the Law School begin with the foundation of the University of St Andrews, around 1413. A group of Augustinian clergy, driven from the University of Paris by the Western Schism and from the universities of Oxford and Cambridge by the Anglo-Scottish Wars, formed a society of higher learning in St Andrews, which offered courses of lectures in subjects including law. Through several centuries the teaching of law was incorporated into St Mary's College at St Andrews. By the late 19th century, St Andrews was contending with geographic isolation and dwindling numbers of students, whilst University College Dundee, founded in 1881, was burgeoning in nearby Dundee.

Law lectures had commenced in Dundee on 18 January 1866 with the first, entitled "Law Studies", given by William Guthrie. Guthrie, at that time an advocate, later became editor of the Journal of Jurisprudence (1867-1874) and of editions of both Erskine and Bell's Principles of the Law of Scotland (1870-1899). This series of lectures was sponsored by the Society of Writers in the city and in particular organised by Sir Thomas Thornton, founder of the eponymous law firm.

Following several aborted attempts at various forms of incorporation and association, in 1890 the university college began to establish closer links with St Andrews and it was incorporated into the university in 1897. The campus in Dundee was reconstituted as Queen's College in 1954, with the teaching of law formally transferred to a new Faculty of Law in Dundee. In 1967, the independent University of Dundee was created by Royal Charter, incorporating the former Queen's College, including the now School of Law. St Andrews became, and remains, the only ancient university not to offer the study of law.

== Academics ==
=== Undergraduate ===
Rankings
National rankings
- Complete (2027): 25
- Guardian (2027): 9
- Times / Sunday Times (2027): 8

Global rankings
- QS (2027): 301-350
- THE (2026): 251-300

Dundee is one of two law schools in the United Kingdom to offer qualifying Bachelor of Laws (LL.B.) degrees in both Scots and English/Northern Irish law—the other being Strathclyde Law School. Both LL.B. degrees can also be taken as "Law with Languages" degrees in French, German or Spanish. Dundee pioneered the "dual qualifying" degree in Scots and English law which has since been rolled out at other Scottish institutions.

Admission is extremely selective; for undergraduate degrees an average of 1,300 applications are received per year for approximately 180 places. Dundee traditionally has a small staff and student body with around a third of the number of students at Glasgow and Edinburgh law schools and half of those at Aberdeen law school.

=== Postgraduate ===
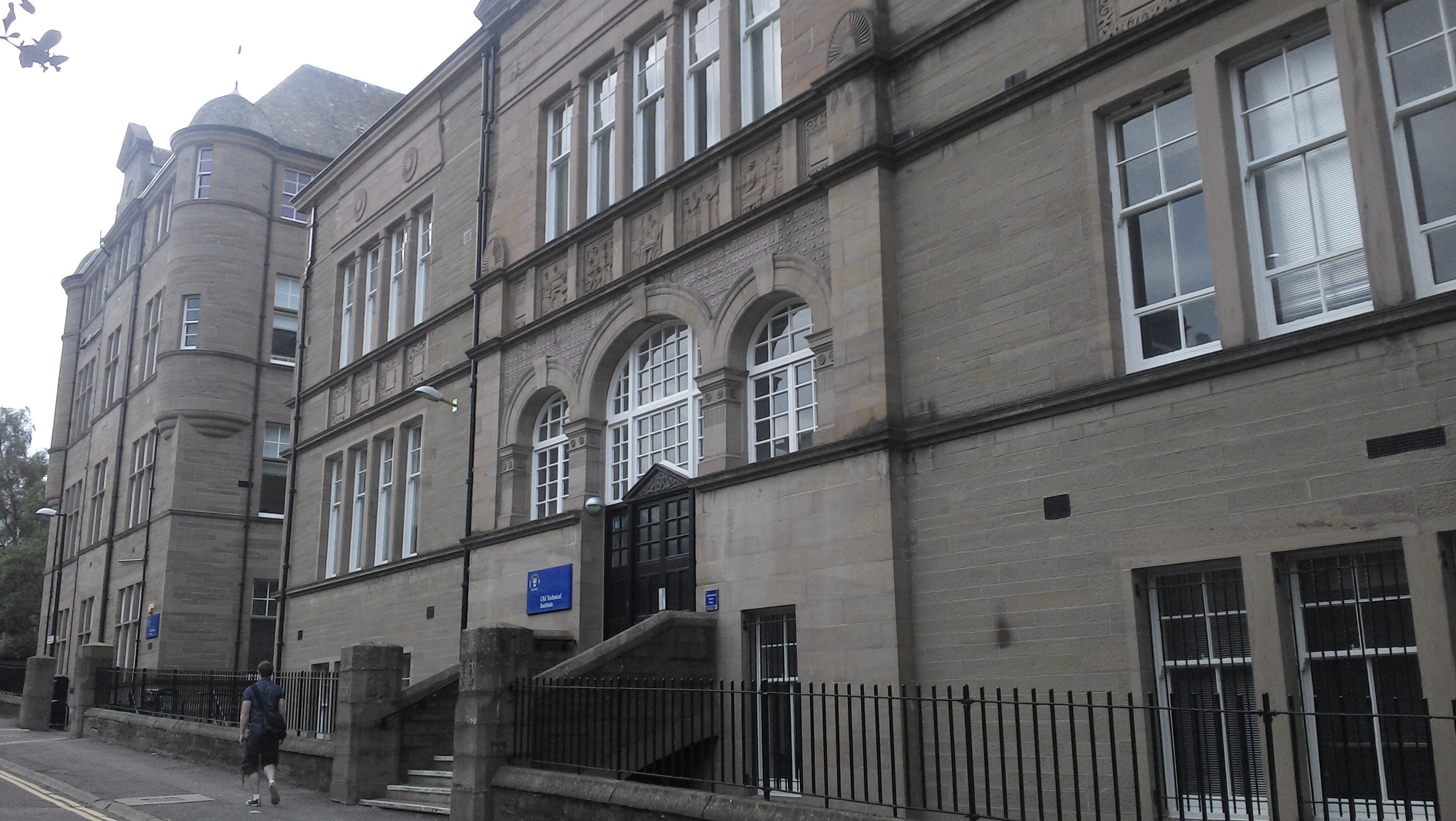
Facilities for postgraduates are located in the Old Technical Institute

At postgraduate level, the Law School offers a range of Master of Laws (LL.M.) courses and the vocational Diploma in Professional Legal Practice (PgDip). Undergraduate and postgraduate teaching in energy and minerals topics is delivered in conjunction with the University's Centre for Energy, Petroleum and Mineral Law and Policy, and the UNESCO Centre for Water Law, Policy and Science.

=== Research ===
In the 2014 Research Assessment Exercise the law school was one of only two in the UK to have 100% of its research rated as being of "international standard". Dundee is the only law school to have achieved that feat in both the 2008 and 2014 Research Assessment Exercises.

== Initiatives ==
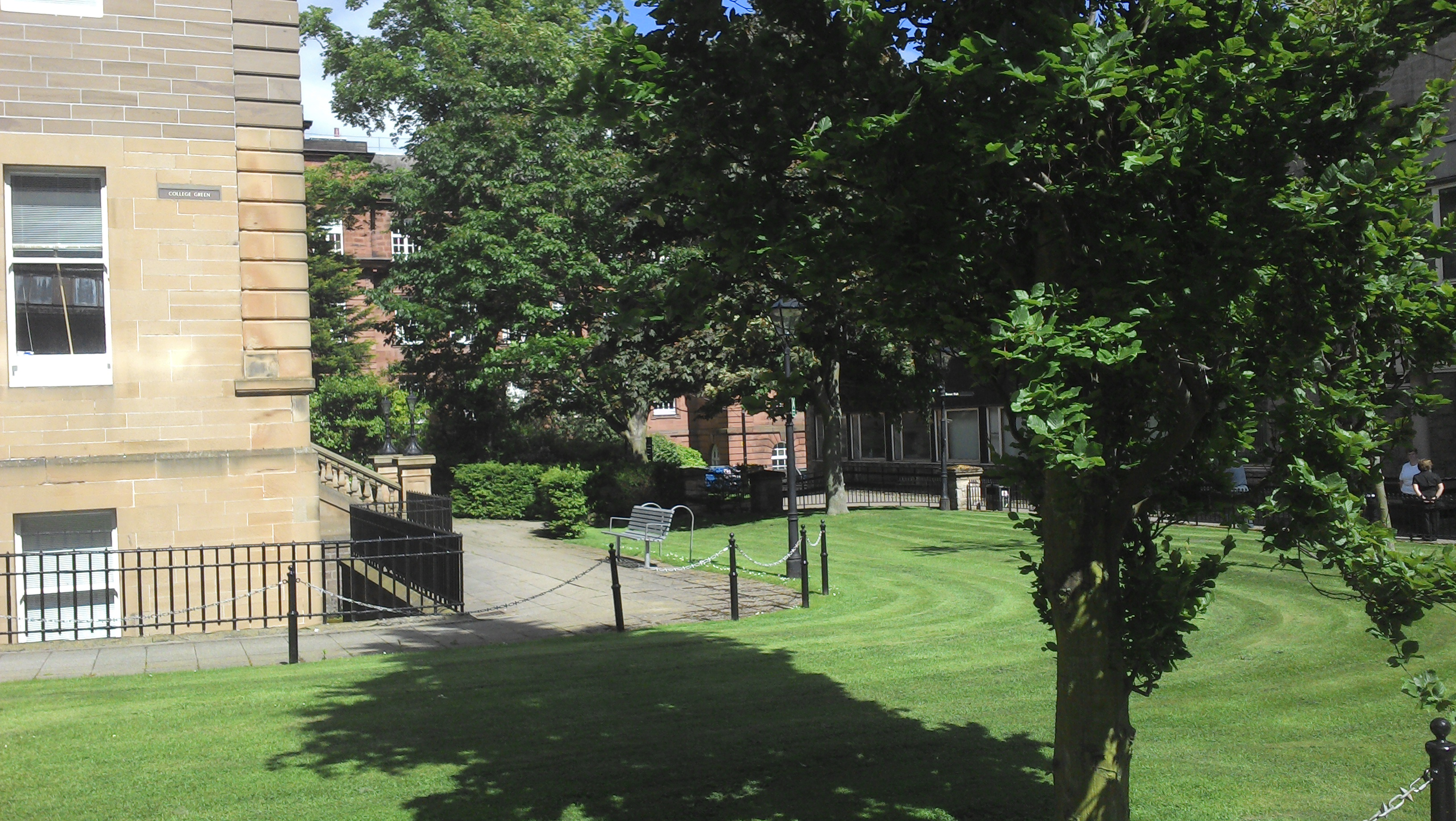
The Scrymgeour Building viewed through the trees at College Green

Dundee International Law Society

Dundee International Law Society is a student-led society made up of current and former Dundee University students, faculty members as well as scholars and friends from across the wider legal and academic community. The Society represents one of several linkages between the School of Law and the Centre for Energy, Petroleum and Mineral Law and Policy. Dundee International Law Society organises regular seminars, colloquia, debates, roundtables and presentations on a wide range of international law problems and prospects, and serves as an informal society for analysis of international law questions both great and small. Practitioners, academics and students are invited to attend, to participate and to present papers or lead discussions.

Dundee Student Law Review

The Law School publishes a student law review bi-annually. The review offers the first chance for most students to publish their academic writing.

Law Clinic

The student-run Law Clinic offered free legal advice and help to residents of Dundee, including both the local and student populations, who could not afford a solicitor and do not qualify for legal aid. The Law Clinic became operational on 31 January 2011.

Law Society

The long running student law society organises social- and careers-events for Dundee law students. Several traditional social events take place each year, including a Gaudie Night where first year students are assigned 'parents' from older years, with whom they must survive the night and who will then act as academic and social mentors. The law society also runs an annual pub quiz which is typical attended by teams of academics from within the School, and hosts an annual law ball at different ornate locations around Scotland. The law society further coordinates the School's sports teams which compete in inter-varsity matches against law schools from elsewhere in the United Kingdom, in sports such as football, basketball and hockey.

Mooting

The Law School has an active mooting society, which organises an internal competition and competes in various Scottish and UK external competitions. The Honorary President of the Mooting Society is Lord Justice Jones. The Mooting Society bases itself at the moot court room located within the School's premises at the Scrymgeour Building. In 2013/14, the Mooting Society entered the Alexander Stone Moot, the Inner Temple Inter-Varsity Moot, the ESU/Essex Court Moot, the NSLS Moot and the OUP/BPP National Moot. Out of these competitions, the Dundee team made it to the semi-final of the Inner Temple Inter-Varsity Moot and the final 16 teams in the ESU/Essex Court Moot. Furthermore, three of the Society's undergraduates represented Scotland in the 37th Edition of the Telders International Law Moot Court Competition held at the Peace Palace in the Hague, Netherlands. The Dundee team participated in the "Roundsian Rescue Dispute" together with another 27 teams from 26 countries across Europe, and were named "Outstanding Team".

== Notable alumni ==
Frank Doran MP

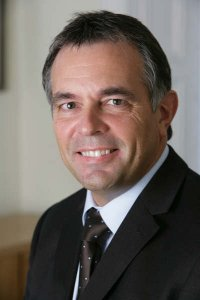
Kevin Dunion OBE

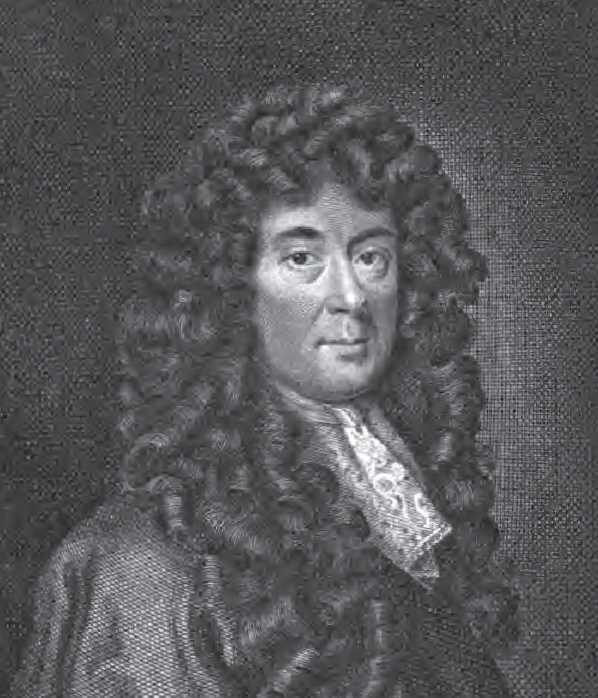
George Mackenzie.

- David Burns, Lord Burns, Senator of the College of Justice
- Sir Colin Campbell, former Vice-Chancellor of University of Nottingham
- Colin Campbell, Lord Malcolm, Senator of the College of Justice
- Christopher Chope Member of Parliament, former Minister of State and barrister
- Lynda Clark, Baroness Clark of Calton, former Member of Parliament and Advocate General for Scotland, now Senator of the College of Justice
- Chris Clarkson, Member of Parliament
- William Cullen, Baron Cullen of Whitekirk KT FRSE FREng, Advocate, Lord Justice General and Law Lord as well as life peer
- Thomas Dawson, Lord Dawson, former Solicitor General for Scotland and Senator of the College of Justice
- Kurt Deketelaere, Secretary-General of the League of European Research Universities
- Anuja Dhir, HH Judge Anuja Dhir, Circuit Judge at the Old Bailey (and first non-white woman judge at the Old Bailey).
- William Kirk Dickson, Advocate, librarian and writer, Keeper of the Advocates' Library and Librarian of the National Library of Scotland
- Frank Doran, Member of Parliament for Aberdeen North
- Kevin Dunion, Scottish Information Commissioner (2003–12), as well as former Lord Rector of the University of St Andrews
- Tim Eicke, Judge of the European Court of Human Rights
- Donald Findlay, criminal defence advocate and honorary chairman of Dundee University Student Bar Society
- Maurice Golden, current Shadow Cabinet Secretary for the Environment, Climate Change & Land Reform
- Grant Johnson, former professional footballer and tutor in Private Client Law at the School
- Michael Jones, Lord Jones, Senator of the College of Justice and Honorary President of the School mooting society
- Walter Kamba, Zimbabwean lawyer and Vice-Chancellor of University of Zimbabwe
- Alhaji Shehu Ladan, Nigerian lawyer
- John S. Lowe, visiting professor at the University and expert in energy law
- Neil MacCormick, professor of jurisprudence at the School and legal philosopher
- Finlay Macdonald, retired minister and Principal Clerk to the General Assembly of the Church of Scotland
- Ronald Mackay, Lord Eassie, judge, former chairman of the Scottish Law Commission and Senator of the College of Justice
- George Mackenzie, Lord Advocate and legal writer
- Samuel Marful-Sau, active Justice of the Supreme Court of Ghana (2018–)
- Jenny Marra, read the Diploma in Professional Legal Practice
- Claude Moraes, former Commissioner for Racial Equality, former Member of the European Parliament
- Robert Moray, judge, diplomat and natural philosopher
- Elijah Ngurare, Namibian politician, Secretary General of the SWAPO Party Youth League
- Nhial Deng Nhial, Minister of Foreign Affairs for the Republic of South Sudan
- Kenneth Norrie, eminent professor of Scots Family Law and Delict Law, head of department at Warwick University and former chair at King's College London
- Thomas Shaw, 1st Baron Craigmyle, Scottish Liberal politician and judge
- Jim Spence, sports broadcaster
- Alan Turnbull, Lord Turnbull, Senator of the College of Justice
- Evadne L. Wade-Garcia, author and director of the Geology and Petroleum Unit in Belize's Ministry of Science, Technology and Transportation

== See also ==
- Legal education in the United Kingdom
