= Lord Bannatyne =

Lord Bannatyne may refer to:

- Iain Peebles, Lord Bannatyne
- William Bannatyne, Lord Bannatyne
