= Building Design Partnership =

UK architectural firm founded 1961

BDP
- Founded: 1961; 65 years ago
- Founder: George Grenfell-Baines
- Headquarters: 11 Ducie Street, Piccadilly Gardens, Manchester, England
- Services: architecture, engineering
- Number of employees: 950
- Website: BDP website

Building Design Partnership Ltd, doing business as BDP, is a firm of architects and engineers employing over 900 staff in the United Kingdom and internationally.

== History ==
BDP was founded in 1961 by George Grenfell-Baines with architects Bill White and John Wilkinson, quantity surveyor Arnold Towler and eight associate partners. The associates were made full equity partners in 1964. Grenfell-Baines was the first chairman.

BDP was the result of a series of experiments in profit sharing and multidisciplinary working begun by Grenfell-Baines in 1941 with the Grenfell Baines Group. A 1962 policy statement committed BDP to “the principle of equal status for all professions”. The firm expanded rapidly over the following decades and had 30 partners and 700 staff by the time of Grenfell-Baines's retirement in 1974. The firm has been associated with a variety of large public and private projects, such as the controversial Preston bus station that was designed by BDP's Keith Ingham and Charles Wilson, and retail projects such as the Liverpool One complex.

BDP's principal offices, inherited from Grenfell Baines & Hargreaves, were in London, Manchester and Preston. By 1970, there were branch offices in Belfast, Glasgow and Guildford plus international offices in Memphis, Rome and Johannesburg.

As of 2016 BDP was reported to be the UK's second largest architecture firm, with 950 employees. In March 2016, the Japanese engineering firm Nippon Koei bought all of the stock of BDP for a total sale price of £102.2 million.

In 2017, BDP was appointed architect for the refurbishment project for the Palace of Westminster.

In 2018, BDP won the Carbuncle Cup award for worst new building of the year for their development of Redrock in Stockport, United Kingdom.

In June 2020, BDP announced plans to make up to 70 UK staff redundant, blaming uncertainty arising from the ongoing COVID-19 pandemic and Brexit.

== Selected Projects ==
- Rebuilding of Aldershot Military Town (1961–69)
- University of Surrey, Guildford (1965–68)
- University of Bradford (1965–71)
- Preston bus station (1968–69)
- Kilburn Building, University of Manchester (1972)
- Nancy Rothwell Building, University of Manchester (2021)
- Blackburn Central Area Redevelopment (Blackburn Shopping Centre) (1965–77)
- Bank House (Bank of England regional headquarters), Leeds (1969–71)
- Halifax HQ, Halifax (1973 & refurbishment 2002)
- Channel Tunnel Terminal, Folkestone (1973-5, revived 1987-93)
- Brent Cross refurbishment, London (1994+)
- Ealing Broadway Centre (1979–85)
- Kingston upon Hull Combined Court Centre (1988–90)
- All England Lawn Tennis Club, Wimbledon (1992–2000)
- Reconstruction of Royal Opera House, Covent Garden, London (1996–2000) with Dixon Jones
- Reconstruction of Manchester, Manchester (1997-2001)
- Cribbs Causeway, Bristol (1998)
- Scottish Widows, Edinburgh (1998) Number 93 of Prospect 100 best modern Scottish buildings
- Adam Opel Campus, Rüsselsheim, Germany (1998)
- Niketown, London (1999)
- Connolly Station, Dublin (1999)
- Vasco da Gama Centre, Lisbon (1999)
- Olympic Tennis Centre, Sydney (2000)
- Glasgow Science Centre, Glasgow (2001)
- Manchester Piccadilly station concourse (2001–02)
- Sao Gabriel & Sao Rafael Towers, Lisbon (2001–04)
- Hampden Gurney C of E School, London (2002) - Nominated for Stirling Prize
- iceSheffield, Sheffield (2002)
- TresAguas Centre, Madrid (2002)
- Royal Albert Hall, 30 discrete projects including the South Porch (2003)
- Nanoscience Centre, University of Cambridge (2003)
- BBC Mailbox, Birmingham (2004)
- Olympic Tennis Centre, Athens (2004)
- Faculty of Education, University of Cambridge (2005)
- Melbourne City Waterfront (2006)
- Aintree Racecourse, Merseyside (2007)
- Liverpool One, Merseyside (2008) - Masterplan nominated for Stirling Prize in 2009
- Mandi, Himachal Pradesh, Indian Institute of Technology Mandi (2011) - Masterplan
- Riverside East building, The Robert Gordon University, Aberdeen (2013)
- University of Strathclyde Technology and Innovation Centre, University of Strathclyde, Glasgow (2015)
- Fit-out of PwC office in Belfast, won a BCO Award (British Council for Offices) for best fit-out of workplace (2021)
- Construction of rooftop plaza, extended arcade and subterranean food hall Westgate Oxford, with A&M, Panter Hudspith, Howells Architects and Dixon Jones, Oxford (2015–2017)
- Construction of Edinburgh St James arcade and public realm, with residential accommodation above in place of previous precinct, connecting 2 of the prime shopping streets of Edinburgh, with AMA, Edinburgh 2016-2021
- Louisa Martindale Building, Brighton Hospital, for NHS Sussex 3Ts redevelopment, Brighton 2015 to 2023
- Construction of Google KGX1 new London headquarters, Kings Cross Regeneration, London (2015–2026) with Heatherwick Studio and Studio BIG

== Image Gallery of BDP Projects ==
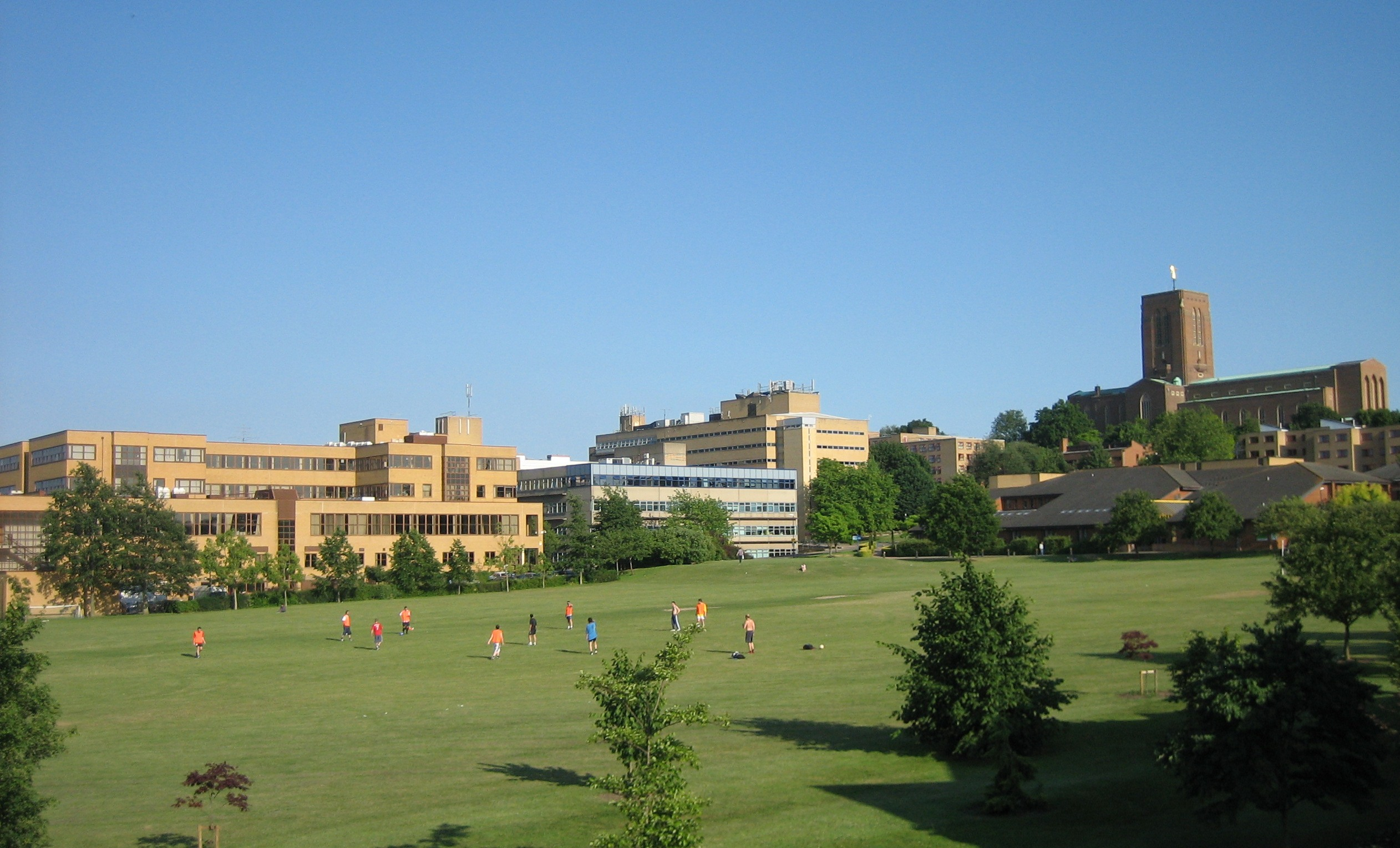
University of Surrey, Guildford (1965–68)

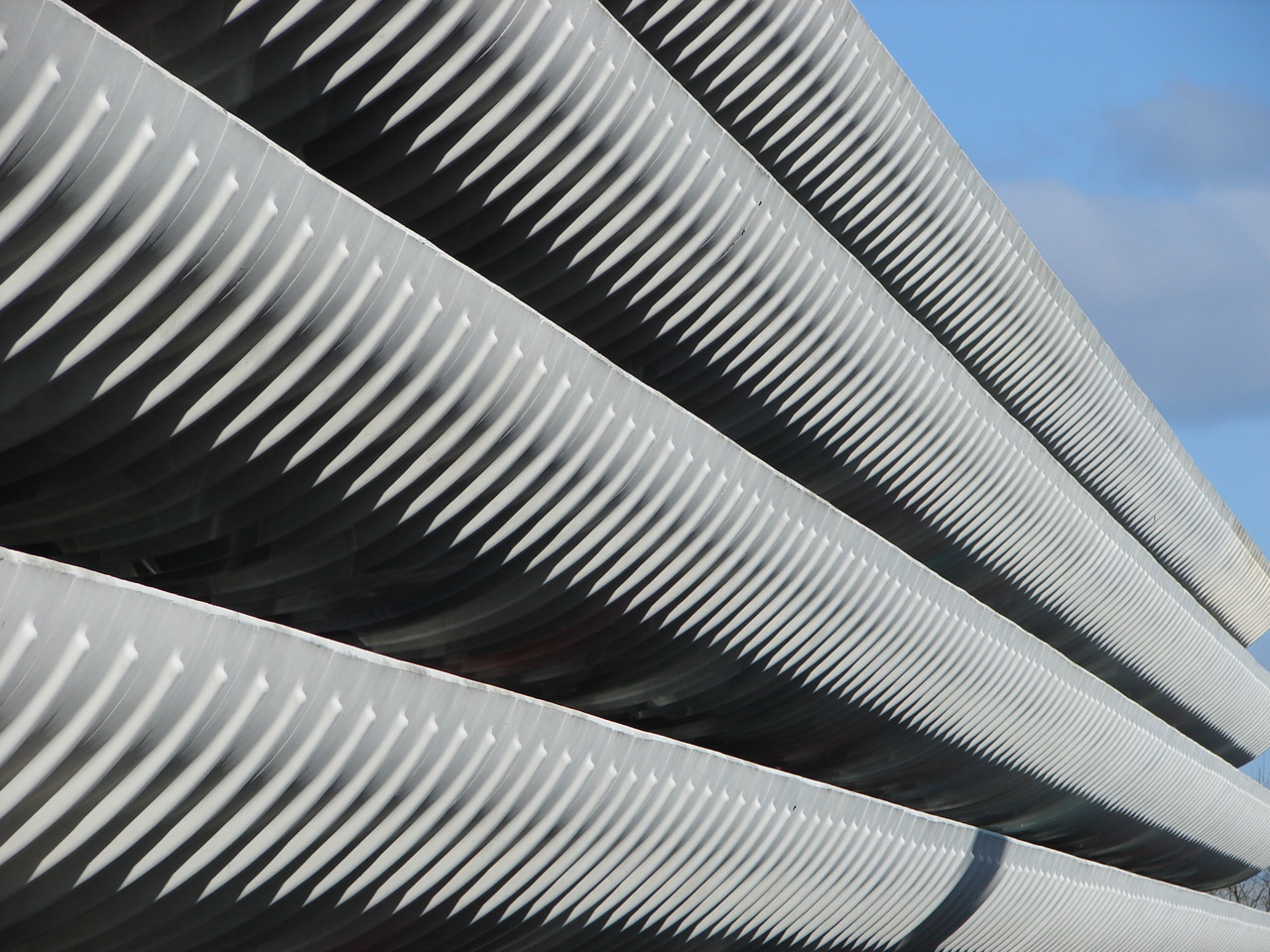
Preston bus station (1968–69)

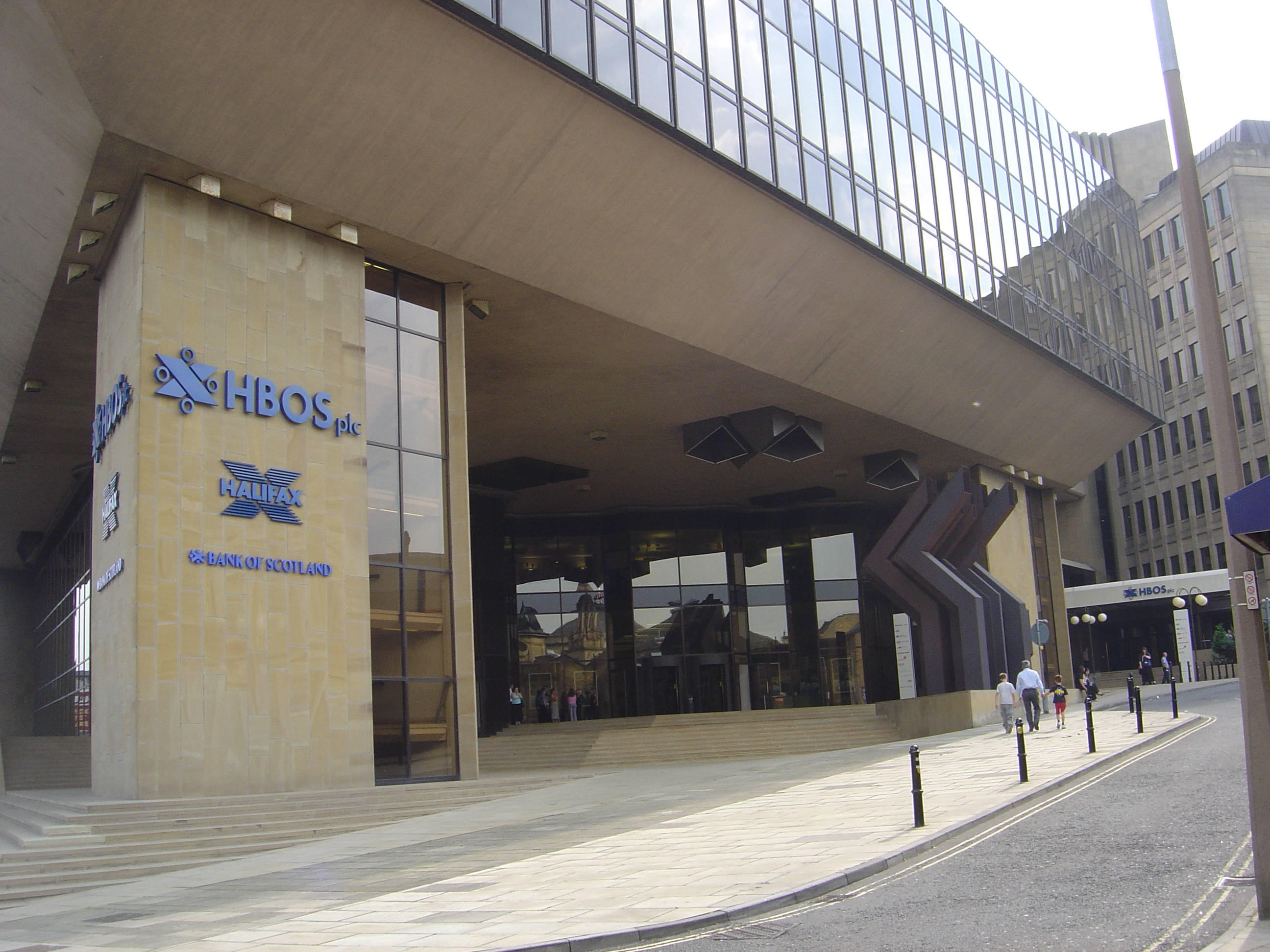
Halifax HQ, Halifax (1973 & refurbishment 2002)

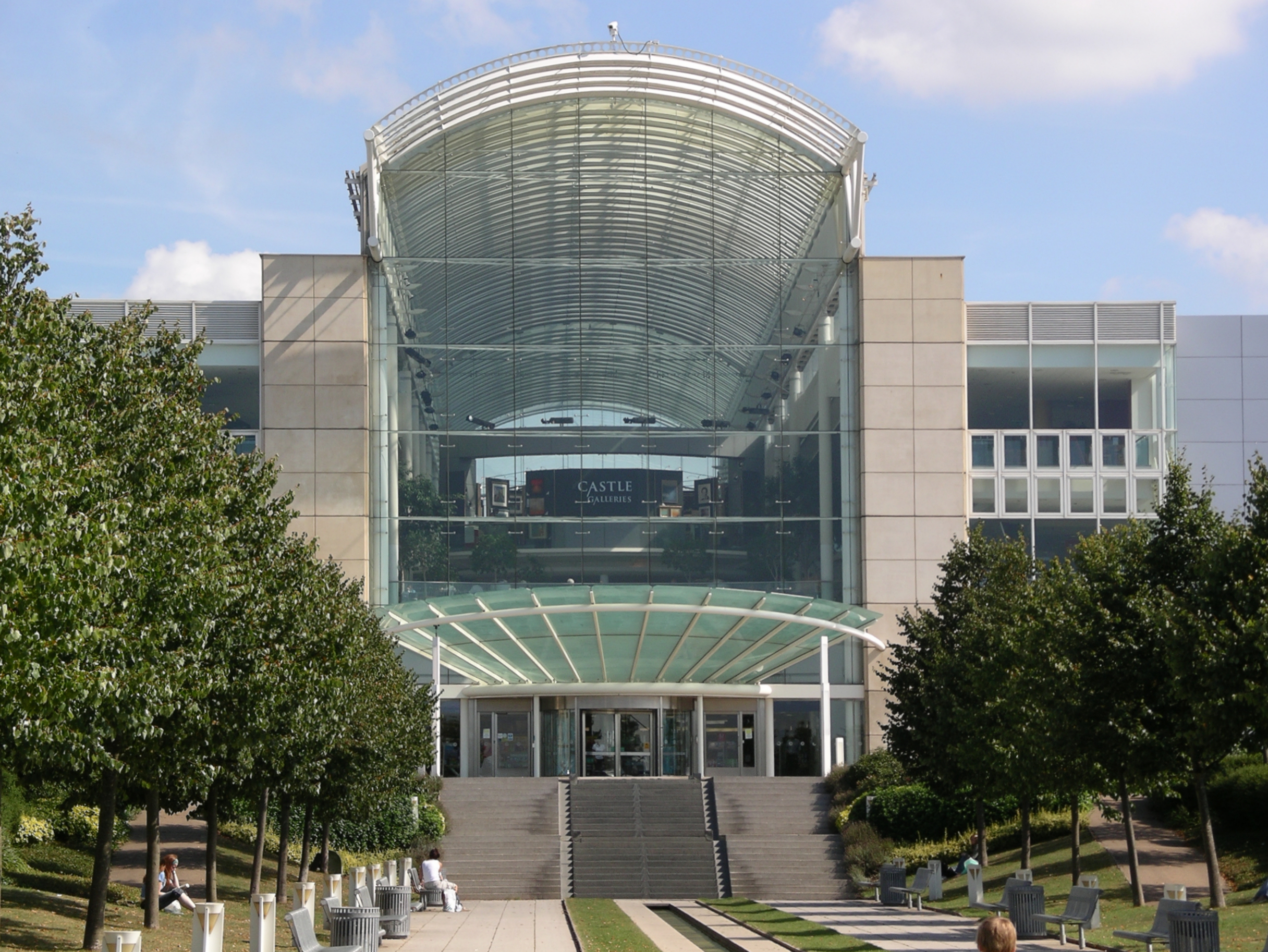
Cribbs Causeway, Bristol (1998)

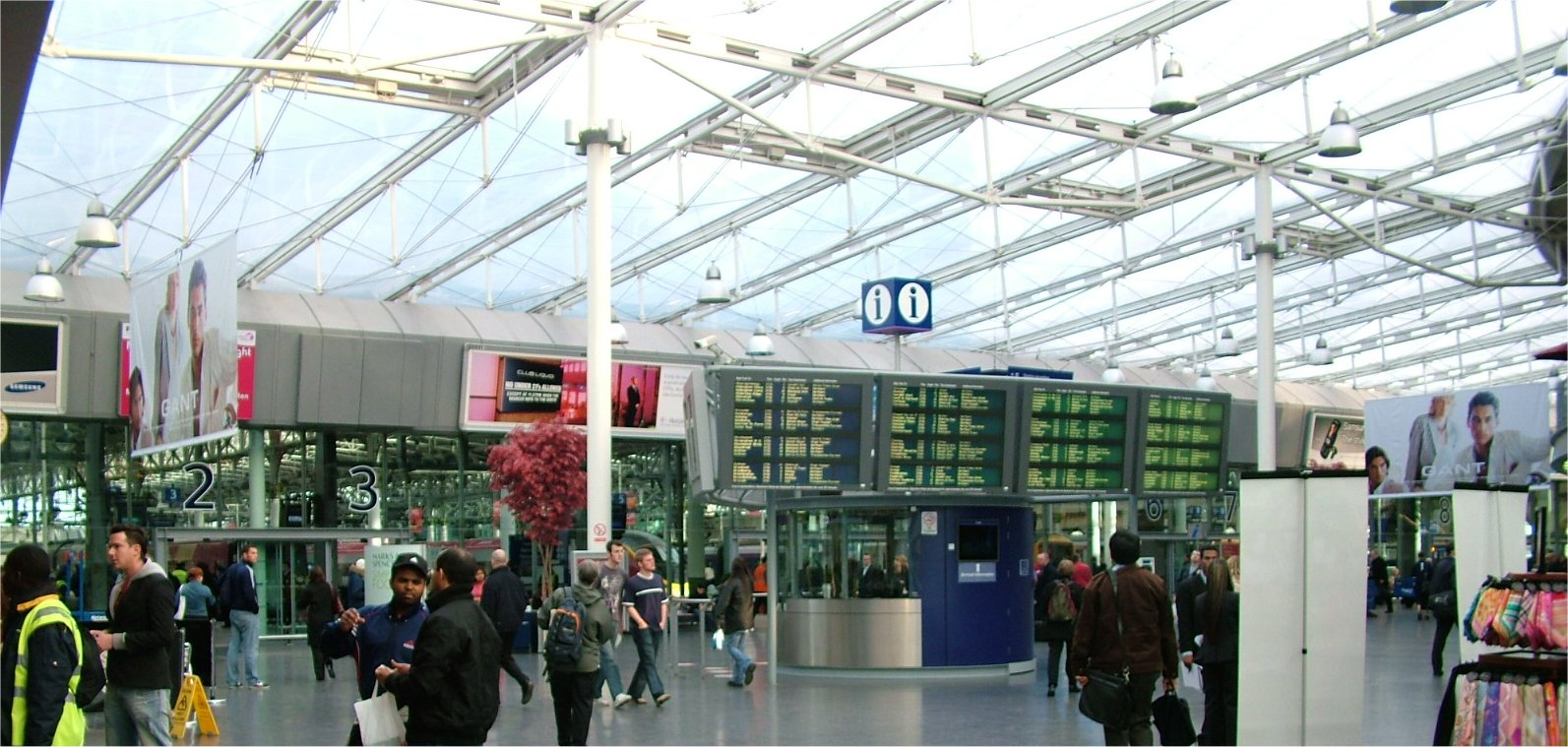
Manchester Piccadilly station (2001–02)

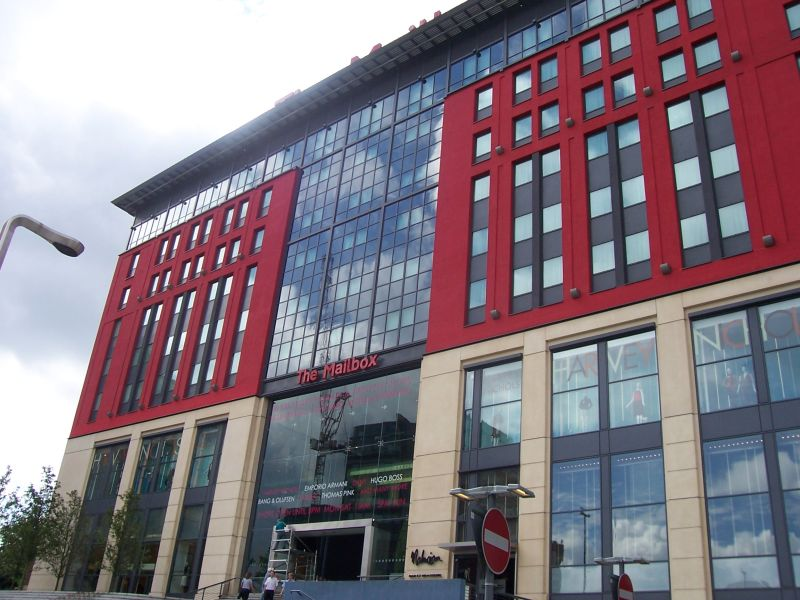
BBC Mailbox (2004)

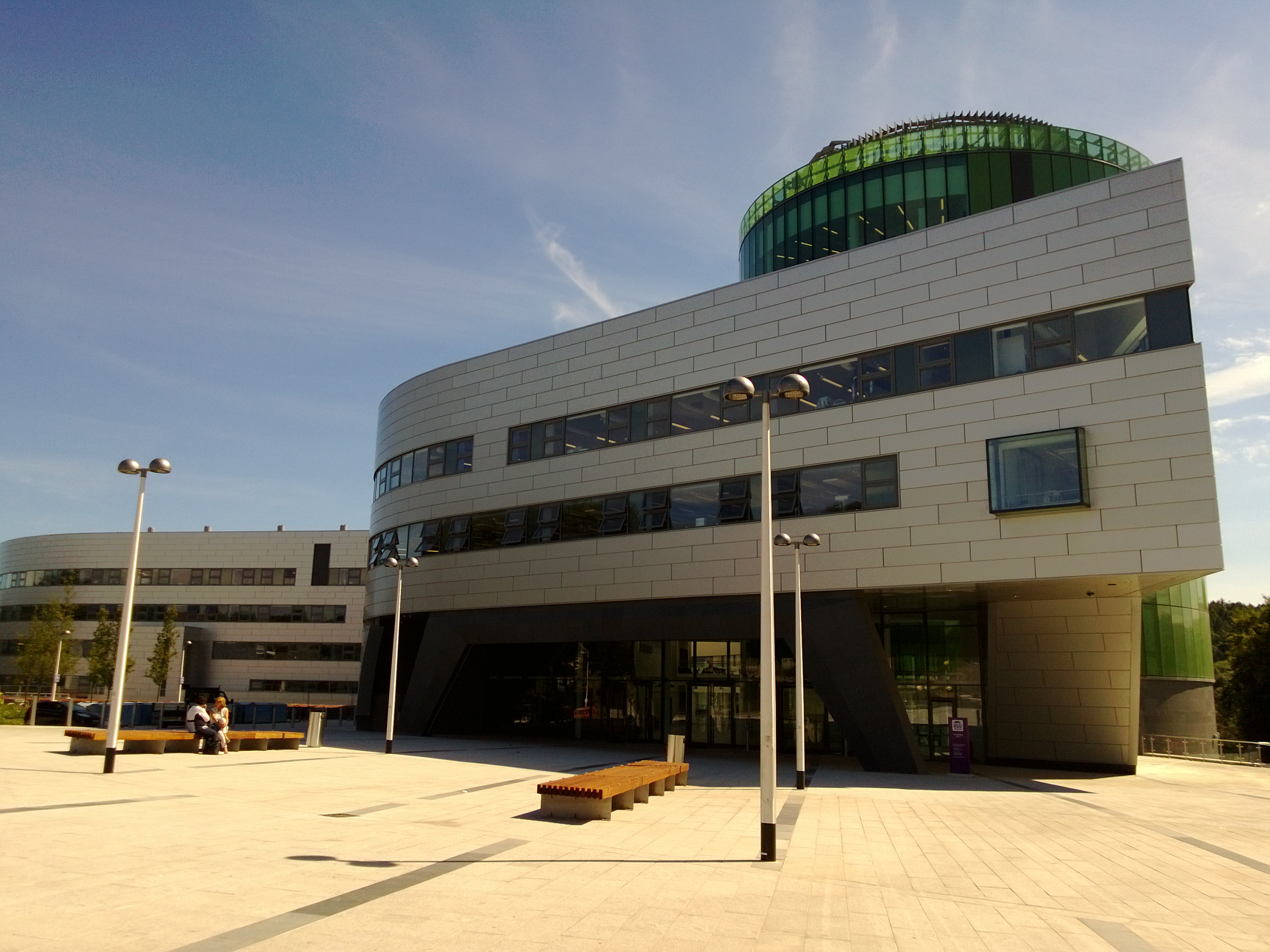
Sir Ian Wood building (formerly Riverside East), The Robert Gordon University, Aberdeen (2011–13)

== People who have worked for BDP ==
- Leon Krier
- Michelle McDowell
- Richard Saxon
- Michael Webb
