= Centre for Energy, Petroleum and Mineral Law and Policy =

- Type: graduate school
- Established: 1977
- Affiliations: University of Dundee,
- Administrative staff: 33 (plus 88 honorary)
- Students: 350
- Postgraduates: 350
- Doctoral students: 40
- Location: Dundee, Scotland
- Director: Professor Peter Cameron
- Website: cepmlp.org

The Centre for Energy, Petroleum and Mineral Law and Policy (CEPMLP) is a graduate school at the University of Dundee, Scotland, United Kingdom, focused on the fields of international business transactions, energy law and policy, mining and the use of natural resources.

It is affiliated with, but not part of, the University of Dundee School of Law.

The CEPMLP is part of the University of Dundee's School of Social Sciences and is based in the Carnegie Building on the Geddes Quadrangle of the university's main campus.

The CEPMLP adopts an interdisciplinary approach to teaching, research and consultancy providing perspective on how governments, business and communities operate.

== Master's degrees ==
The CEPMLP offers a wide range of degrees from full-time taught master's degrees both full-time on site and by distance learning, as well as research degrees and executive leadership programmes.

== Academic credentials ==
- Current RAE (UK Research Assessment Exercise) rating of 5.
- Awarded the highest rank available by the UK Quality Assurance Agency for Higher Education (2002)for the taught postgraduate programme.
- Queen's Award for Enterprise in International Trade, 2004
- Doctoral programme with more than 40 PhD students.
