= Michael Jones, Lord Jones =

Scottish Senator of the College of Justice

The Honourable Lord Jones

Senator of the College of Justice
- In office 2012–2016
- Nominated by: Alex Salmond; As First Minister
- Appointed by: Elizabeth II

Personal details
- Born: Michael Scott Jones; 18 February 1948 Edinburgh, Scotland
- Died: 13 March 2016 (aged 67–68)
- Profession: Advocate
- Website: Judiciary of Scotland

Michael Scott Jones, Lord Jones (18 February 1948 – 13 March 2016) was a Scottish Senator of the College of Justice.

Jones was commissioned as an officer of the Royal Air Force in 1968, and later qualified as a pilot. He flew F-4 Phantoms in Germany.

Jones was called to the bar in Scotland in 1977 and in England and Wales in 1987. He was appointed a Queen's Counsel in 1989. He served as standing counsel to the Scottish Department of Trade and as an Advocate Depute. From 2008 he was Senior Partner for the law firm Simpson & Marwick and head of its Dispute Resolution Department and its Advocacy Unit.

In 1997, Jones was appointed part-time Chairman of the Police Appeals Tribunal and became an Ordinary Judge of Appeal in Jersey and in Guernsey in 2005. On 1 June 2012, it was announced he had been appointed a Senator of the College of Justice, and he took up the post on 11 July 2012. Jones was the Honorary President of the mooting society at the University of Dundee School of Law.

Jones died suddenly in Edinburgh on 13 March 2016, aged 68.
