= University of Strathclyde Faculty of Science =

Scottish university science department

The University of Strathclyde Faculty of Science is the faculty of science at the University of Strathclyde, in Glasgow, Scotland. The faculty contains a number of departments offering both undergraduate and postgraduate courses.

The Faculty of Science is based on the John Anderson Campus. The faculty has over 3,000 students and receives a grant income for research of over £20million.

== Departments ==
The faculty consists of five departments:

- Pure & Applied Chemistry
- Mathematics & Statistics
- Computer and Information Sciences
- Physics
- Strathclyde Institute of Pharmacy and Biomedical Sciences (SIPBS)

=== Pure & Applied Chemistry ===
The Department of Pure & Applied Chemistry is the school of chemistry. Most recently, greater than £10 million was spent on the departments buildings and laboratories.

The department is home to a number of Centres, namely: - The Doctoral Training Centre in Synthetic and Medicinal Chemistry - The Centre for Nanometrology - The Centre for Process Analysis & Control Technology (CPACT) - The Centre for Physical Organic Chemistry - The Centre for Forensic Science

=== Mathematics & Statistics ===
This department was previously two separate entities; the Department of Mathematics, and the Department of Statistics and Modelling Science. However, they merged to form the single Department of Mathematics and Statistics.

Research is focused on applied mathematics in the broadest sense, with an emphasis on nonlinear systems and solution of problems with industrial relevance.

=== Computer & Information Sciences ===
The department is engaged in research across Computer and Information Sciences, spanning Artificial Intelligence, Software Engineering, Information Retrieval, Mobile and Ubiquitous Interaction, Functional Programming, Dataflow Systems, Database Indexing and Information Science.

In addition to research, the department offers a wide range of undergraduate and postgraduate courses. Many of these are cross disciplinary, with courses jointly run with the Strathclyde Business School and the university's Law School.

=== Physics ===
The department offers undergraduate courses which lead to both the award of BSc and MPhys. They also offer a number of postgraduate taught courses, including Masters courses in High-Power Radio Frequency Science and Engineering, Nanoscience, Optical Technologies, Photonics and Device Microfabrication and Quantum Information and Coherence

Based on the Research Excellence Framework (REF) 2014 GPA Scores, Times Higher Education ranked the department as number one in the UK for physics research. Since 2014 the university's Institute of Photonics has been incorporated within the Department of Physics.

=== Strathclyde Institute of Pharmacy and Biomedical Sciences (SIPBS) ===
SIPBS is a research centre and school of pharmacy. A £36 million purpose-built building was completed in 2011.

Research within the institute is through six Research Groups:

- Cardiovascular Research
- Cell Biology
- Infection, Immunity and Microbiology
- Medicines Use and Health
- Neuroscience
- Pharmaceutical Sciences

=== Dean of Faculty ===
The current dean of the Faculty is Iain Hunter. After being a professor of Molecular microbiology for 13 years at Strathclyde University, Hunter he became the dean of the faculty in 2008. Hunter is based in the Strathclyde Institute of Pharmacy and Biomedical Sciences." Originally, Hunter graduated from Glasgow University with an honours degree in biochemistry and a PhD in Microbial Physiology (the study of how the microbial cell functions biochemically).

== Research ==
The Faculty of Science has the largest number of research students in the university. The Faculty of Science collaborates with many external groups such as the European Space Agency, NASA, NHS Scotland, and the Metropolitan Police.

=== Centre for Digital Library Research ===
The Centre for Digital Library Research (CDLR) was a research unit based within the then Information Resource Directorate (IRD) and later the Department of Computer and Information Sciences. It was established in 1999 by Prof. Derek Law, Head of the Information Resources Directorate, as a centre of expertise in digital library research and digital library development activities. It later contributed to the research portfolio of the Department of Computer and Information Sciences, including the Research Assessment Exercise and Research Excellence Framework. The centre was disbanded in 2011 following organisational changes at the University of Strathclyde.

The centre was originally established to further the application of web technologies within the context of digital libraries, thereby contributing to the development of national and global networked information services. This often entailed the concept of holistic approaches to system development whereby tangible technical outputs were interconnected and used to further research of a specific issue or problem. During its operation the centre received numerous grants from a wide variety of funders, including the Jisc, the Scottish Funding Council (SFC), the European Commission, the British Academy, the New Opportunities Fund and others. A number of these grants, particularly those from the Jisc, funded the creation of service nodes within the Jisc's Information Environment, such as terminology services and federated search tools. Research specialisms for the centre were varied but included topics such as digital content creation and maintenance, resource discovery, syntactic and semantic interoperability across distributed digital libraries and repositories, metadata schema, digitization and digital preservation.

Although the Centre ceased operations in 2011, some of its technical outputs from research and development activities, such as the Glasgow Digital Library, remain available and supported by the University of Strathclyde Library.

Perhaps the best known of the centre's technical outputs was the BUBL Information Service. Originally predating the advancements in web searching offered by emergent services like Google, BUBL offered a searchable directory of specially selected and described web resources, covering all subjects of academic relevance for the UK higher education community. The directory BUBL operated was similar to the Yahoo! Directory but was instead organised, described and navigable according to the Dewey Decimal Classification (DDC) system
