= University of Strathclyde Faculty of Humanities and Social Sciences =

The Faculty of Humanities and Social Sciences (HaSS) is one of four faculties at the University of Strathclyde. The faculty was formed in August 2010 from the merger of the Faculty of Education with the Faculty of Law, Arts and Social Sciences.

It is the largest faculty in the university and the restructuring saw some significant changes to the courses on offer.

Since it was formed the faculty has been headed by the Dean, Professor Tony McGrew.

== Schools ==
The faculty is divided into six schools.

=== The Department of Social Work and Social Policy ===
The school hosts the Centre for Excellence for Looked After Children in Scotland (CELCIS) and the Centre for Youth and Criminal Justice.

=== The Strathclyde Institute of Education ===
The school offers a wide variety of honours and master's degrees such as Primary Education, Education and Social Sciences, Childhood Practice and Teaching with (Chemistry, Mathematics or Physics).

=== The Department of Government and Public Policy ===
Established in 2010 by the merger of the Department of Government and Public Policy with three research centres - the European Policies Research Centre, the Centre for the Study of Public Policy and the Centre for Elections and Representation Studies.

Andrew Goudie is a visiting professor at the faculty.

=== The Department of Humanities ===
The School researches historical and contemporary culture.

=== The Strathclyde Law School ===
Strathclyde Law School was established in 1964. In 2011 the school announced they would be developing a masters in advocacy, the first course of its kind in the UK.

=== The Department of Psychological Sciences and Health ===
The School provides teaching in the following areas Psychology, Speech and Language Therapy, Physical Activity for Health, and Counselling.

=== Humanities and Social Sciences Quarter ===
The Lord Hope and Curran buildings underwent a £14m redevelopment by the architect firm Sheppard Robson. The extensive refurbishment and alteration allowed the building to become a major part of the university's new Humanities and Social Sciences Quarter.

Moving staff into the new facilities allowed the university to close their Jordanhill site, where their education faculty had been based since 1993.
