= University of Strathclyde Technology and Innovation Centre =

Coordinates: 55°51′37″N 4°14′33″W

Technology and Innovation Centre
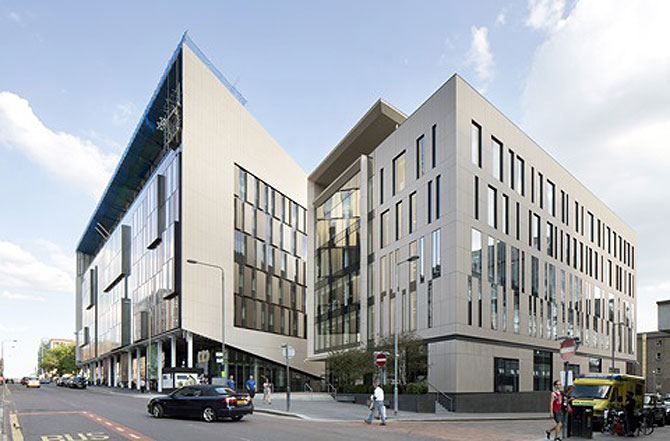
- Interactive map of the Technology and Innovation Centre area

General information
- Type: Academic
- Location: Glasgow, Scotland
- Construction started: March 2012
- Completed: March 2015
- Inaugurated: 3 July 2015

Technical details
- Floor count: 9
- Floor area: 25,000 m^{2} (270,000 sq ft)

Design and construction
- Architect: BDP
- Main contractor: Lendlease

The University of Strathclyde Technology and Innovation Centre (TIC) is a centre for technological research based in Glasgow, Scotland. The building, designed by BDP, is located on the John Anderson Campus's southern edge within the city centre's Merchant City district.

== History ==
The TIC was funded by the European Regional Development Fund, the Scottish Government and the University of Strathclyde.

Work started on the triangular, nine-story, steel-framed building in March 2012, with a completion date set in 2014. The facility was built to Energy Performance Certificate (EPC) "A" rating standards. The 25,000 m^{2} (270,000 sq ft) space can accommodate 1,200 workers. The building includes open-plan office spaces, three lecture theaters and areas for specialist laboratory equipment. It opened on 3 July 2015.

Besides the Technology and Innovation Centre, a 5,000 m^{2} (54,000 sq ft) Industry Engagement Building, located nearby, accommodates 500 workers.

The research carried out at the centre by 850 researchers is focused on engineering, science, bio-nanotechnology, business, energy, health, technology and asset management.
