= University of Strathclyde =

University in Glasgow, Scotland

- Motto: The Place of Useful Learning
- Type: Public
- Established: 1796 (Andersonian Institute); 1964 (university status by royal charter as University of Strathclyde)
- Academic affiliations: ACU; CESAER; EUA; UArctic; Universities Scotland; Universities UK; Defence Universities Alliance
- Endowment: £49.9 million (2025)
- Budget: £430.6 million (2024/25)
- Chancellor: The Lord Smith of Kelvin
- President: Oscar Harden
- Principal: Stephen McArthur
- Convenor of the Court: David Clark
- Academic staff: 2,010 (2024/25)
- Administrative staff: 2,520 (2024/25)
- Students: 22,225 (2024/25); 19,810 FTE (2024/25)
- Undergraduates: 14,515 (2024/25)
- Postgraduates: 7,710 (2024/25)
- Location: Glasgow, Scotland, UK; 55°51′42.18″N 04°14′30.1194″W
- Campus: Urban More than 500 acres (200 ha)
- Colours: Engineering; Humanities; Science; Business
- Website: www.strath.ac.uk

The University of Strathclyde (Scottish Gaelic: Oilthigh Shrath Chluaidh) is a public research university located in Glasgow, Scotland. Founded in 1796 as the Andersonian Institute, it is Glasgow's second-oldest university, having received its royal charter in 1964 as the first technological university in the United Kingdom. Taking its name from the historic Kingdom of Strathclyde, its combined enrolment of 25,000 undergraduate and graduate students ranks it Scotland's third-largest university, drawn with its staff from over 100 countries.

The annual income of the institution for 2024–25 was £430.6 million of which £119.5 million was from research grants and contracts, with an expenditure of £440.1 million.

== History ==
The university was founded in 1796 through the will of John Anderson, professor of Natural Philosophy at the University of Glasgow. He left the majority of his estate to create a second university in Glasgow which would focus on "Useful Learning" – specialising in practical subjects – "for the good of mankind and the improvement of science, a place of useful learning".

Beginning as the Andersonian Institute, the school changed its name in 1828 to Anderson's University, partially fulfilling Anderson's vision of having a second university in the city of Glasgow. The name was changed in 1887, to reflect the lack of legal standing for the use of the title of 'university'. As a result, the Glasgow and West of Scotland Technical College was formed, becoming the Royal Technical College in 1912, and the Royal College of Science and Technology in 1956 concentrating on science and engineering teaching and research. Undergraduate students could qualify for degrees of the University of Glasgow or the equivalent Associate of the Royal College of Science and Technology (ARCST).

Under Principal Samuel Curran, internationally respected nuclear physicist (and inventor of the scintillation counter), the Royal College gained University Status, receiving its Royal Charter to become The University of Strathclyde in 1964, merging with the Scottish College of Commerce at the same time. Contrary to popular belief, The University of Strathclyde was not created as a result of the Robbins Report – the decision to grant the Royal College university status had been made in 1962 but delayed as a result of Robbins Report. The University of Strathclyde was the UK's first technological university, reflecting its history, teaching and research in technological education. Between the granting of the Charter and the late 1970s, the university expanded rapidly in size, in tandem with the ongoing regeneration of the Townhead area of the city where the campus is located. In 1993, the university incorporated Jordanhill College of Education.

The university grew from approximately 4,000 full-time students in 1964 to over 20,000 students by 2003, when it celebrated the 100th anniversary of the laying of the foundation stone of the original Royal College building.

In recognition of its founder, and the loss of association with his name, the university named its city centre campus the John Anderson Campus in..

In July 2015, queen Elizabeth II opened the University of Strathclyde Technology and Innovation Centre (TIC).

== Campus ==
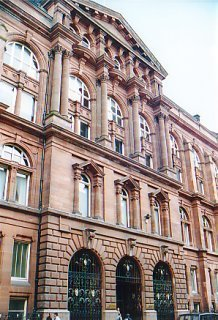
Royal College Building, Strathclyde University

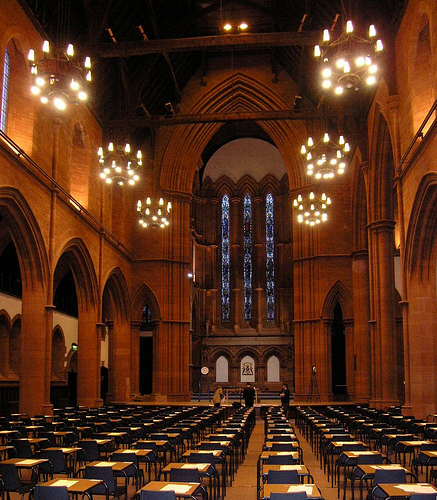
Barony Hall, Strathclyde University

The John Anderson Campus is located mostly within the Townhead district, on the north-eastern side of Glasgow city centre, with some buildings located south of this in the Merchant City area. The campus grew initially from the Royal College Building on George Street, which was originally the location of the former Anderson's Institution. Work started in 1903 and completed in 1912, it was partially opened in 1910 and at the time was the largest educational building in Europe for technical education. Originally built as the Glasgow and West of Scotland Technical College Building, it now houses Bioscience, Chemistry, and Electronic and Electrical Engineering. In the mid-1950s, campus expansion began with the construction of the Engineering Block (James Weir Building), Chemistry Block (Thomas Graham Building) and Student's Union buildings. Following the granting of the Royal Charter and the Royal College gaining university status in 1964, the campus grew quickly in size. The Corporation of Glasgow had already rezoned what had been a densely populated residential and industrial area for educational use as part of the Townhead "Comprehensive Development Area" (CDA) and by the time of the foundation of the university, slum clearances has already begun In the area. By 1974, thirteen new buildings were erected on what would grow to a 25-acre (10-hectare) site.

The new Engineering Block, built in 1956 was the first major expansion of the Royal College, and was extended in 1963 in tandem with the construction of the new Chemistry Block. These buildings would be named the James Weir Building and Thomas Graham Building respectively. The former was refurbished and reopened in 2014 after a serious fire resulted in many rooms being unusable.

University of Strathclyde Students' Association was founded in 1964 out of the merger of the respective student unions of both the Royal College and the Scottish College of Commerce and was located at 90 John Street, which was constructed by the Royal College in 1959. It remained the home of the Association until August 2021, when it moved into new accommodation within the former Colville Building on Richmond Street. The original student union buildings on were left derelict until late November 2024, at which point it was announced that they were to be renovated into a Digital, Entrepreneurial and Social Engagement Hub. This is expected to be completed in 2026.

The Graham Hills Building was originally an office block known as 'Marland House', built by the General Post Office and completed in 1959 for the GPO's Telephones division and other governmental organisations but was acquired by the university in 1987 from British Telecom and converted for academic use in the early 1990s. It is now the location of the "Strathclyde Wonderwall", one of the biggest wall murals in the United Kingdom.

The early 1960s also saw the fruition of a collaborative deal between the then Royal College and the Corporation of Glasgow to regenerate the Richmond Street site opposite the main buildings. This led to the construction of the McCance Building and the Livingstone Tower between 1962 and 1964, the latter having originally been designed as a commercial office block, but was instead leased to the university in 1965, and has been used as an academic building ever since.

The Architecture Building, completed in 1967, was designed by Frank Fielden and Associates, Frank Fielden being the Professor of Architecture in the Architecture School at the time. In 2012, Historic Scotland granted Listed Building Status (grade B) to it, along with the Wolfson Centre designed by Morris and Steedman Architects. 2012 also saw the 20th Century Society select the Architecture Building as their 'Building of the Month' for September due to its cultural significance and enduring appeal. Meanwhile, a new biomedical sciences building was opened in early 2010. It was designed by Sheppard Robson, and aims to bring the multi-faceted disciplines of the Institute together under one roof. Sited on Cathedral Street in Glasgow, the 8,000 m^{2} (86,000 ft^{2}) building is the gateway to the university campus and city centre from the motorway.

In 1973, the university reached an agreement with the publisher William Collins, Sons to purchase its former printing works along Cathedral Street and St James's Road. Three buildings from the site were ultimately retained – most notably the giant warehouse which became the Curran Building and Andersonian Library.

The University of Strathclyde Centre for Sports, Health and Wellbeing is a leisure facility undergoing construction situated adjacent to 100 Cathedral Street. Construction began in November 2016 and completed in 2019.

In 1993, the Jordanhill Teacher Training College was merged with the University of Strathclyde to produce the new Faculty of Education at a separate campus to the core university (within the suburb of Jordanhill). This operated until 2012, at which point the university's Estates Steering Group and Court decided that Strathclyde should be consolidated to a single campus. The Faculty of Education was moved to a newly constructed building on the John Anderson campus in the summer of 2012.

=== Library and archives ===
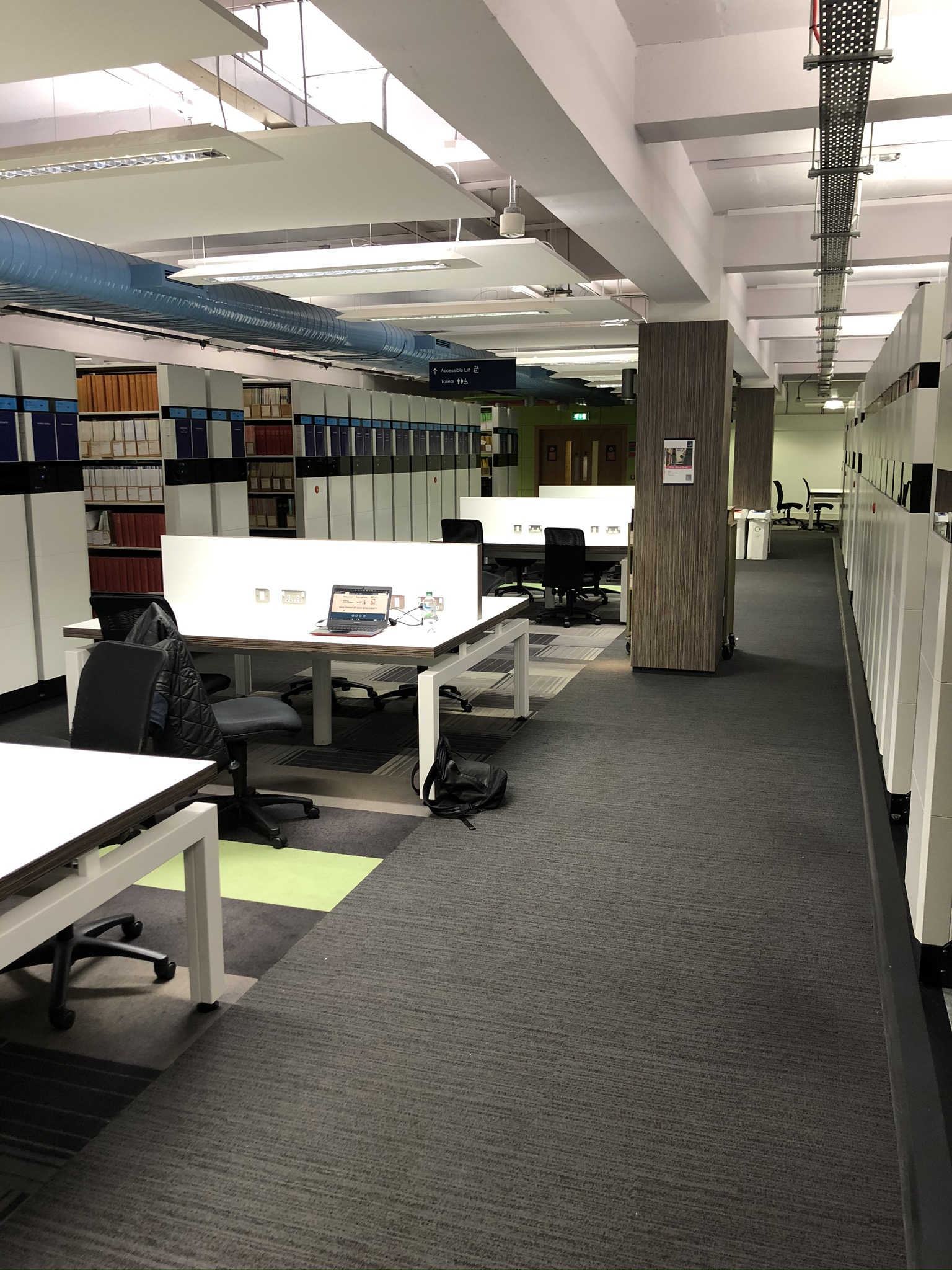
Andersonian Library, University of Strathclyde, Glasgow

The Andersonian Library is the principal library of the University of Strathclyde. Established in 1796, it is one of the largest of its type in Scotland. It is situated in the Curran Building, a former warehouse and printing works built by William Collins, Sons in 1960, but purchased by the university in the mid-1970s and converted for academic use between 1978 and 1981. Situated over 5 floors at present, the Andersonian Library has more than 2,000 reader places, 450 computer places and extensive wi-fi zones for laptop use. It has around one million print volumes as well as access to over 540,000 electronic books, 239 databases and over 38,000 e-journals that can be used 24/7 from any suitably enabled computer.

The archives are divided into 3 as follows.

University Archives

The official records of the University of Strathclyde from 1796 to the present day. Includes the records of the university's predecessor institutions as well as the papers of many former staff and students and associated organisations.

Deposited Archives

A diverse range of archives which have been acquired by gift or deposit to support the university's teaching and research.

Special Collections

Rare or significant printed material and books, including the Anderson Collection (the personal library of John Anderson, 1726–1796, natural philosopher), plus over 30 other collections spanning the 16th to the 21st centuries.

=== Technology and Innovation Centre ===
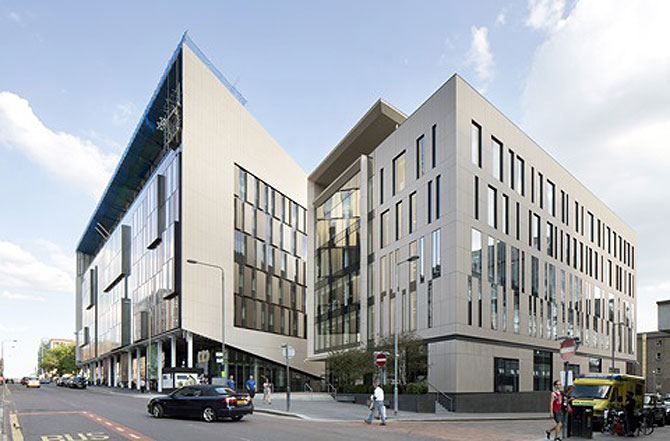
University of Strathclyde, Technology and Innovation Centre

The University of Strathclyde Technology and Innovation Centre is a centre for technological research. The construction of this centre began in March 2012 and was completed in March 2015. The nine-storey, steel-framed building can accommodate around 1,200 workers from numerous fields, including engineering, researching and project management. It includes open plan space for offices, three lecture theatres and areas for specialist laboratory equipment.

The project secured a £6.7 million funding from the European Regional Development Fund and another £26 million from the Scottish Government. The university itself supplied the other £57 million needed to reach its £89 million budget needed to create the centre.

In addition to the Technology and Innovation Centre, a 5,000 m^{2} (54,000 ft^{2}) Industry Engagement Building is located adjacent to the TIC building.

Research carried out in the Technology and Innovation Centre is in the fields of: Advanced Engineering and Manufacturing, Advanced Science and Technology, Bionanotechnology, Business Engagement, Continuous Manufacturing and Crystallisation (CMAC), Energy, Health Technologies at Strathclyde, Human and Social Aspects of Technology, Photonics and Sensors, and Asset Management. The TIC hosts the UK's first Fraunhofer research centre, the Fraunhofer Centre for Applied Photonics and TIC also plays a major role in Scotland's International Technology and Renewable Energy Zone (ITREZ).

== Faculties and departments ==
The university currently consists of four main faculties categorised based on subjects and academic fields that they deal with and each faculty is sub-divided into several departments which deal with specific academic and research areas. They are:

Faculty of Engineering

- Architecture
- Biomedical Engineering
- Chemical and Process Engineering
- Civil and Environmental Engineering
- Design, Manufacture and Engineering Management
- Electronic and Electrical Engineering
- Mechanical and Aerospace Engineering
- National Centre for Prosthetics and Orthotics
- Naval Architecture, Ocean and Marine Engineering (Joint department with the University of Glasgow)

Faculty of Science

- Chemistry, Pure and Applied Chemistry
- Computer and Information Sciences
- Mathematics and Statistics
- Physics
- Strathclyde Institute of Pharmacy and Biomedical Sciences

Faculty of Humanities & Social Sciences (HaSS)

- School of Applied Social Sciences
- Strathclyde Institute of Education
- Department of Government & Public Policy
- Department of Humanities
- Strathclyde Law School
- Department of Psychological Sciences and Health
- Department of Social Work and Social Policy

Strathclyde Business School

- Accounting and Finance
- Economics
- Human Resource Management
- Hunter Centre for Entrepreneurship
- Management Science
- Department of Marketing
- Department of Strategy and Organisation

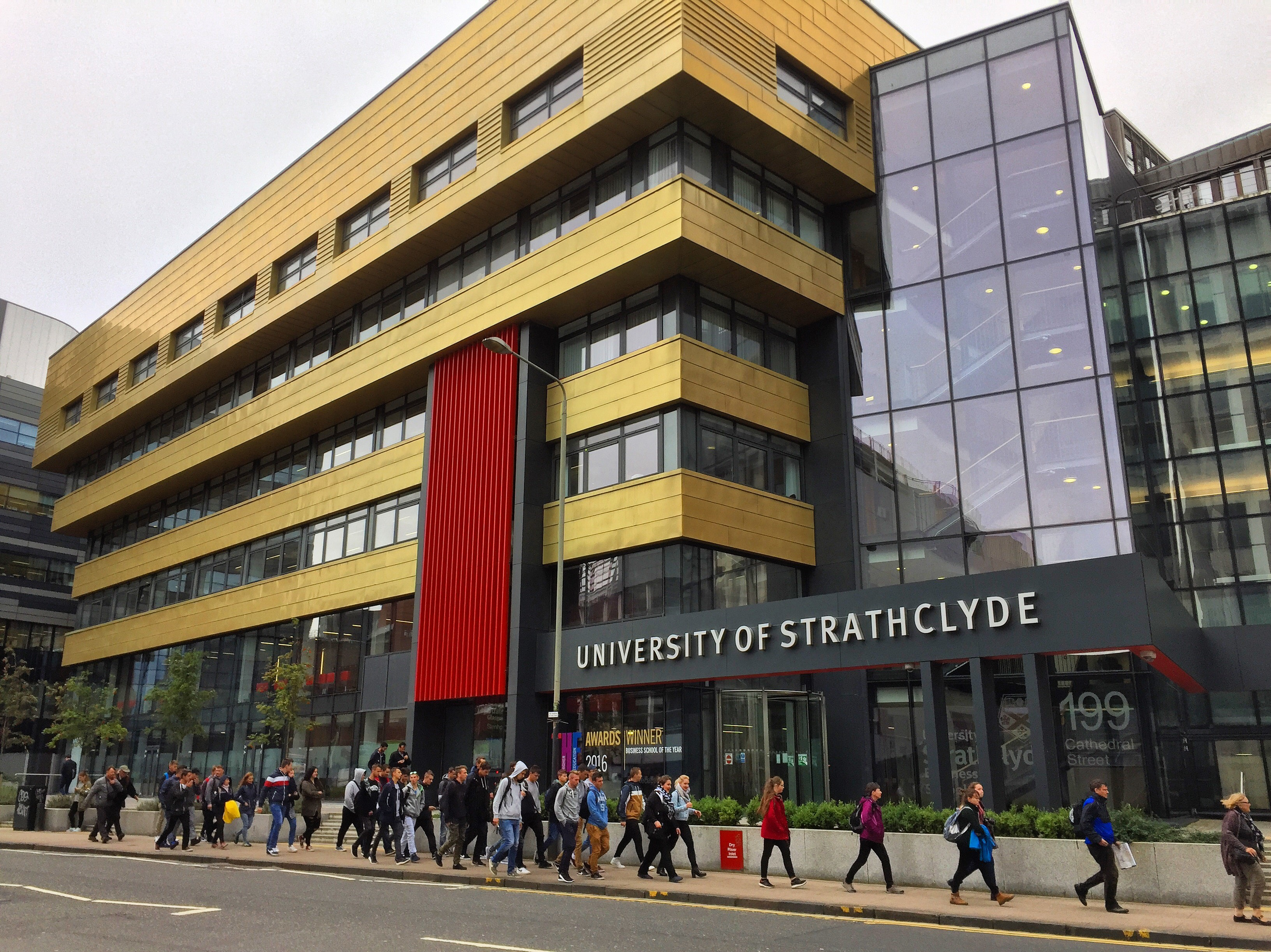
Strathclyde Business School

The university delivered teaching to 24,330 full-time and part-time students in 2024/25: 16,115 undergraduates and 8,215 postgraduates. Another 34,000 people take part in continuing education and professional development programmes.

Strathclyde is the only Scottish university that offers the IET Power Academy engineering scholarships to its engineering students.

=== Finances ===
In the financial year ending 31 July 2024, Strathclyde had a total income of £432.5 million (2022/23 – £487.4 million) and total expenditure of £278.1 million (2022/23 – £402.3 million). Key sources of income included £124.4 million from tuition fees and education contracts (2022/23 – £136.2 million), £113 million from funding body grants (2022/23 – £115.4 million), £118.6 million from research grants and contracts (2022/23 – £115.8 million), £13.9 million from investment income (2022/23 – £7.2 million) and £4.6 million from donations and endowments (2022/23 – £2.6 million).

At year end, Strathclyde had endowments of £46.6 million (2023 – £42.2 million) and total net assets of £565.9 million (2023 – £402.9 million).

== Academic profile ==
=== Admissions ===
UCAS Admission Statistics
	2025	2024	2023	2022	2021
Applications (Note: Main scheme applications, International and UK)	24,280	24,685	24,575	26,810	29,265
Accepted	3,935	4,355	3,715	4,255	4,460
Applications/Accepted Ratio	6.2	5.7	6.6	6.3	6.6
Overall Offer Rate (%)	57.8	58.3	50.9	48.9	46.6
↳ UK only (%) (Note: UK domiciled applicants)	57.0	57.4	49.7	47.6	45.0
Average Entry Tariff	—N/a	—N/a	197	203	210
↳ Top three exams (Note: The maximum tariff score for three exams is 168: the equivalent of A*A*A* at A-Level, 777 at HL for the IB Diploma Programme, or AAA at Advanced Higher)	—N/a	—N/a	122.4	133.5	132.4

HESA Student Body Composition (2024/25)
Domicile and Ethnicity	Total
British White (Note: Not be confused solely with White British)	67%
British Ethnic Minorities (Note: Includes those who indicate that they identify as Asian, Black, Mixed Heritage, Arab or any other ethnicity except White.)	14%
International EU	2%
International Non-EU	17%
Undergraduate Widening Participation Indicators
Female	52%
Independent School	8%
Low Participation Areas (Note: Calculated from the Polar4 measure, using Quintile1, in England and Wales. Calculated from the Scottish Index of Multiple Deprivation (SIMD) measure, using SIMD20, in Scotland.)	5%

In the 2024/25 academic year, the student body consisted of 22,225 students, composed of 14,515 undergraduates and 7,710 postgraduate students. The university is generally designated as a 'medium-tariff', sometimes 'high-tariff', institution by the Department for Education, with the average undergraduate entrant to the university in recent years amassing between 122 and 134 UCAS Tariff points in their top three pre-university qualifications. Based on 2022/23 HESA entry standards data published in domestic league tables, which include a broad range of qualifications beyond the top three exam grades, the average student at the University of Strathclyde achieved 203 points – the fourth highest in the United Kingdom.

=== Rankings and reputation ===
Rankings
National rankings
- Complete (2027): 39
- Guardian (2027): 17
- Times / Sunday Times (2027): 9

Global rankings
- ARWU (2026): 701–800
- QS (2027): 230=
- THE (2026): 351–400

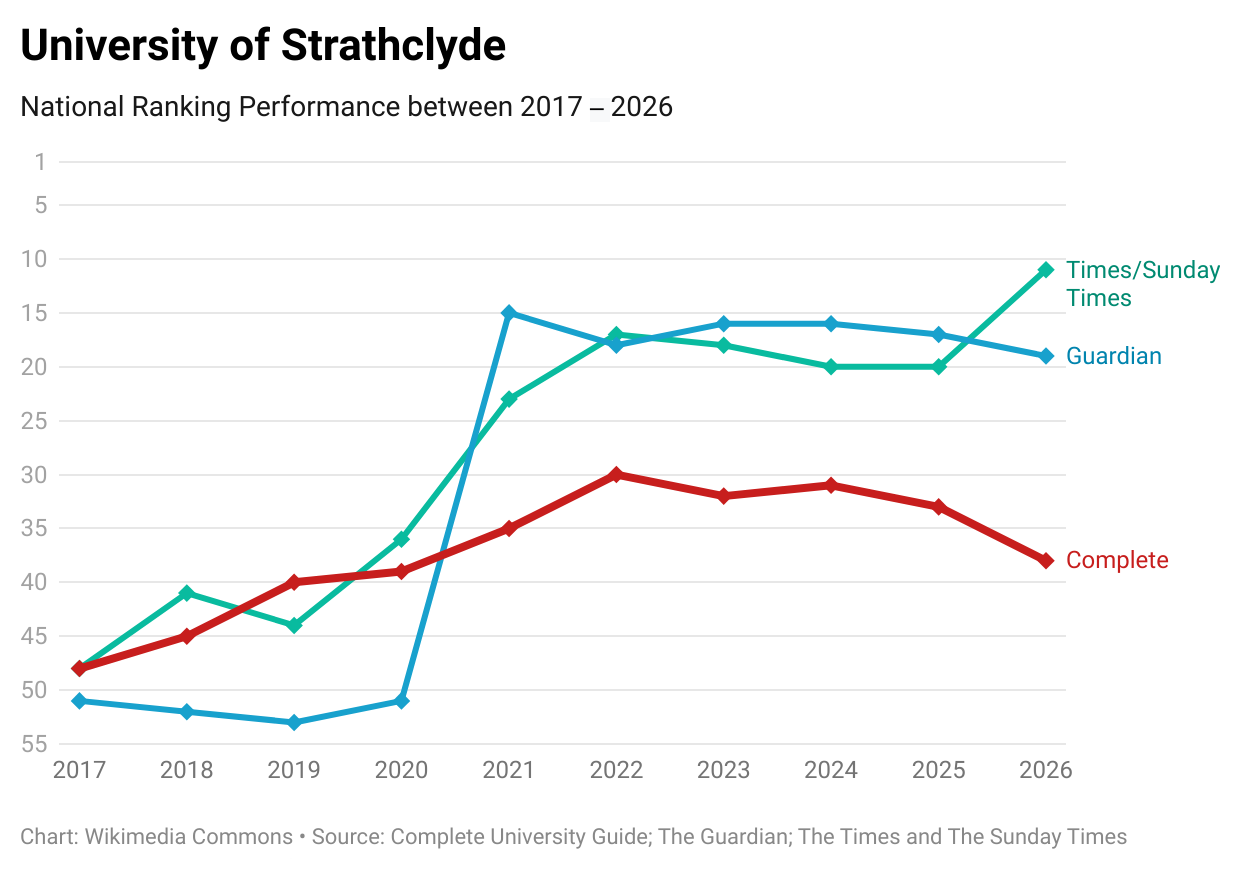
University of Strathclyde's national league table performance over the past ten years

According to the Complete University Guide 2024, the university was ranked in the Top 10 for 12 subjects, including 1st in Forensic Science; 2nd in Creative Writing; 9th in Education; 10th in Speech and Language Therapy; and 10th in Manufacturing and Production Engineering.

In the 2024 Guardian University Guide, Strathclyde ranked in the Top 10 for Civil Engineering (3rd); Sociology and Social Policy (4th); Sports Science (5th); Politics (6th); Health professions (6th); and Hospitality, event management and tourism (10th).

Strathclyde is placed in the top 20 of European business schools in the Financial Times Global MBA Rankings. In this regard, QS World University Ranking placed Strathclyde among 51–100 best universities in business management. Strathclyde Master's programs take 36th place globally in marketing, 51st place globally in business analysis and 55th globally in management, according to QS World University Ranking in 2020.

In 2020, ARWU ranked Strathclyde in the 101–150 best Political Science universities. Since ARWU began to publish a separate subject ranking on Public Administration, Strathclyde has consistently ranked internationally among 76–100 best universities in 2017, 2018, 2019 and 2020.

According to The Complete University Guide, Strathclyde Law School is in the UK's top 10 (2020). According to Times Higher Education, the University of Strathclyde was placed 76th best in law globally among universities in 2018.

QS World University Rankings 2018 placed the university among the top 25 internationally for Hospitality & Leisure Management, 51–100 for Pharmacy, 51–100 for Business & Management, 101–150 for Electrical & Electronic Engineering, 101–150 for Architecture, 101–150 for Education, 151–200 for Accounting & Finance, 151–200 for Law, 151–200 for Civil & Structural Engineering, 151–200 for Mechanical Engineering, 201–250 for Chemical Engineering, 201–250 for Physics and Astronomy, 251–300 for Sociology, 251–300 for Economics, 251–300 for Materials Sciences, 301–350 for Mathematics and 301–350 for Computer Science & Information Systems.

The university is one of the 39 old universities in the UK comprising the distinctive Cluster Two of elite universities after Oxbridge. A detailed study published in 2015 by Vikki Boliver has shown among the Old universities, Oxford and Cambridge emerge as an elite tier, whereas the remaining 22 Russell Group universities are undifferentiated from 17 other prestigious Old universities (including the University of Strathclyde) which form the second cluster.

=== Research ===
In 2011 the university's Advanced Forming Research Centre was announced as a leading partner in the first UK-wide Technology Strategy Board Catapult Centre. The Government also announced that the university is to lead the UK-wide EPSRC Centre for Innovative Manufacturing in Continuous Manufacturing and Crystallisation.

The university has become the base for the first Fraunhofer Centre to be established in the UK. Fraunhofer-Gesellschaft, Europe's largest organisation for contract research, is creating the new Fraunhofer Centre for Applied Photonics in collaboration with Strathclyde, for research in sectors including healthcare, security, energy and transport.

Strathclyde was chosen in 2012 as the exclusive European partner university for South Korea's global research and commercialisation programme – the Global Industry-Academia Cooperation Programme, funded by South Korea's Ministry of Knowledge and Economics.

In 2012 the university became a key partner in its second UK Catapult Centre. Plans for the Catapult Centre for Offshore Renewable Energy were announced at Strathclyde by Business Secretary Vince Cable. The university has also become a partner in the Industrial Doctorate Centre for Offshore Renewable Energy, which is one of 11 doctoral centres at Strathclyde.

Engineers at the university are leading the €4 million, Europe-wide Stardust project, a research-based training network investigating the removal of space debris and the deflection of asteroids.

Strathclyde has become part of the new ESRC Enterprise Research Centre, a £2.9 million venture generating world-class research to help stimulate growth for small and medium-sized enterprises.

Since 2016 the Wellcome Trust has invested over £3 million of funding awards in the university's Centre for the Social History of Health and Healthcare, for research projects, teaching and training programmes, and to build Medical Humanities partnerships in Africa and Asia.

The university has centres in pharmacy, drug delivery and development, micro and ultrasonic engineering, biophotonics and photonics, biomedical engineering, medical devices, new therapies, prosthetics and orthotics, the history of health and healthcare, law, crime and justice and social work. The university is involved in 11 partnerships with other universities through the Scottish Funding Councils' Research Pooling Programme, covering areas such as engineering, life sciences, energy, marine science and technology, physics, chemistry, computer sciences and economics.

Several Strathclyde staff have been elected to Fellowships in the Royal Societies of Edinburgh and London.

=== International collaboration ===
The university is an active member of the University of the Arctic. UArctic is an international cooperative network based in the Circumpolar Arctic region, consisting of more than 200 universities, colleges, and other organisations with an interest in promoting education and research in the Arctic region.

The university also participates in UArctic's mobility program north2north. The aim of that program is to enable students of member institutions to study in different parts of the North.

== Notable people ==
=== Students ===
There are around 15,000 undergraduate students out of which almost 4,000 are mature students who start their studies after gaining experience in the workplace, and almost 16% are overseas students from more than 100 countries around the world. Around 7,000 students are undertaking postgraduate studies at Strathclyde. There are approximately 45,000 students studying part-time in the university each year, either in the evenings and weekends or through distance learning. The university also has an alumni population of over 100,000 and growing.

=== Notable academics and alumni ===
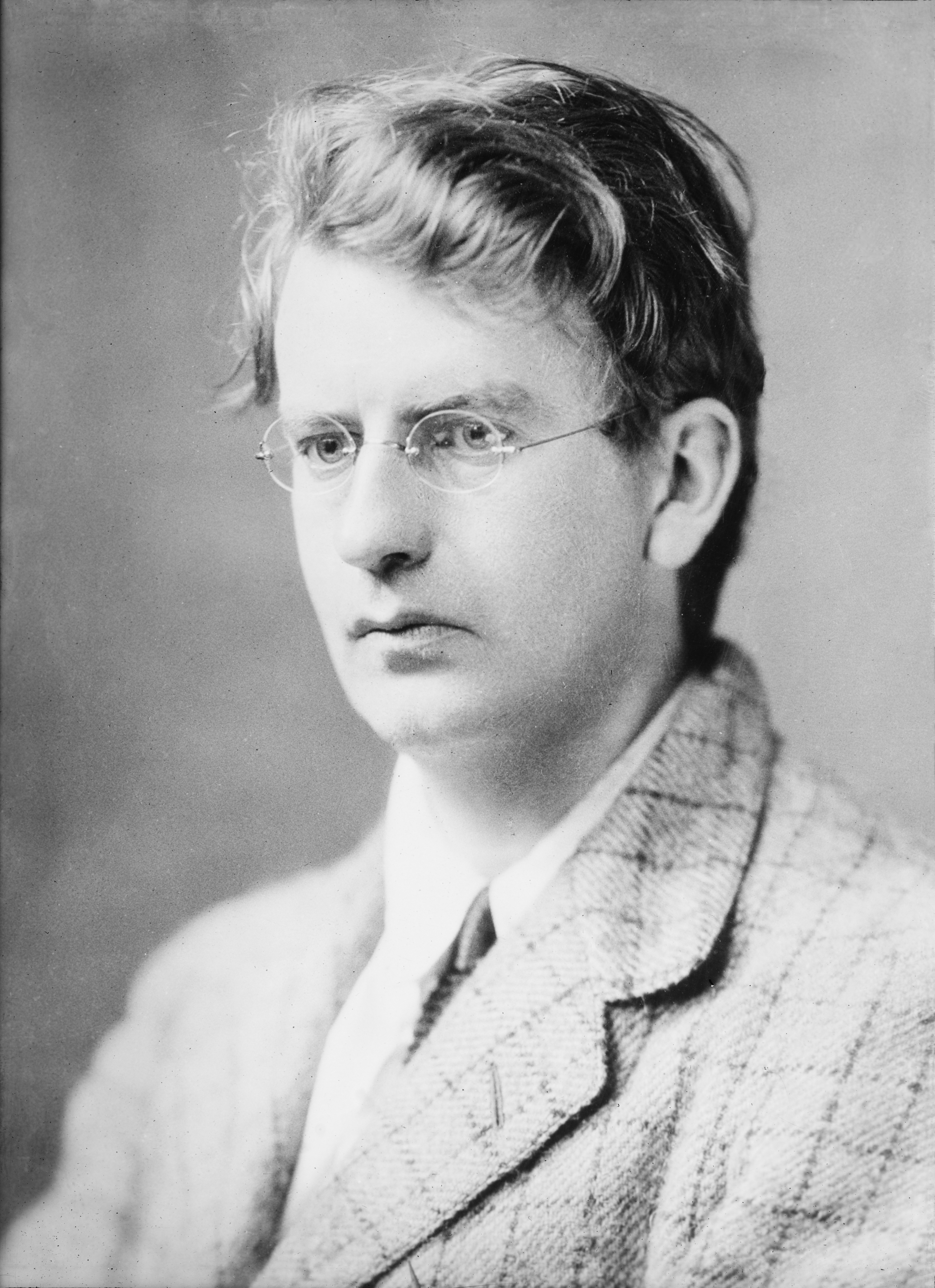
John Logie Baird, inventor

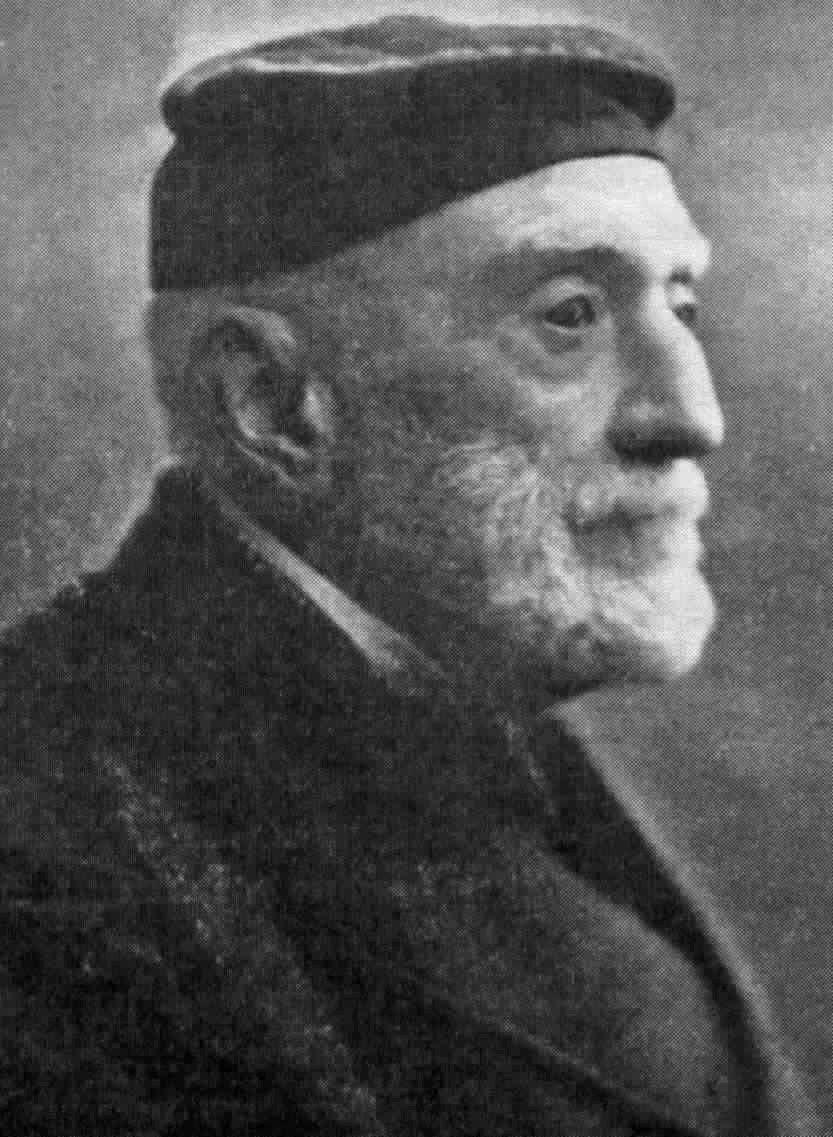
Henry Faulds, inventor

David Livingstone, explorer

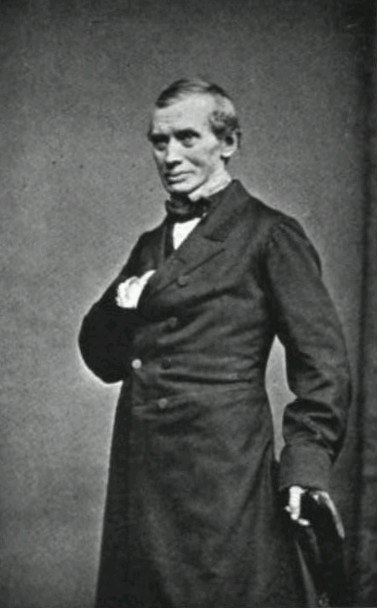
Thomas Graham, chemist

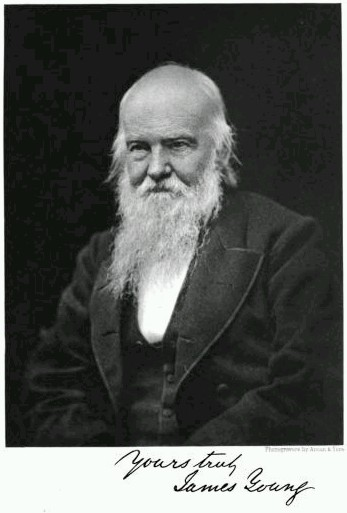
James Young, chemist

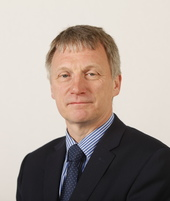
Ivan Paul McKee, member of Scottish Parliament

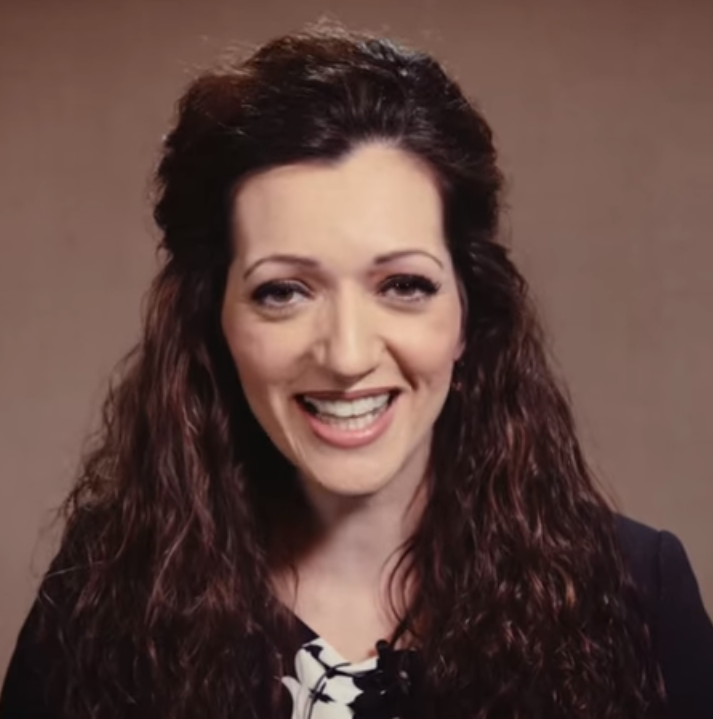
Tasmina Ahmed-Sheikh, political activist

Alumni of Strathclyde and its predecessors (the Andersonian Institute and the Royal College of Science and Technology) include the scientists; William Ramsay, Nobel Prize Winner in Chemistry (1904); John Logie Baird, inventor of the first working television; Henry Faulds, physician, missionary and scientist who developed of fingerprinting; James Young, chemist best known for his method of distilling paraffin from coal and oil shales; Professor John Curtice, a renowned political commentator, Fellow of the British Academy, the Royal Society of Arts and the Royal Society of Edinburgh.

In politics: Annabel Goldie, Baroness Goldie, Leader of the Scottish Conservative Party, member of the House of Lords, Minister of State for Defense; Helen Liddell, Baroness Liddell of Coatdyke, minister in Blair government, a House of Lords member, former British High Commissioner to Australia, former Minister for Trade and Industry, former Minister for Transport, former Economic Secretary of the Treasury, the first female General Secretary of the Scottish Labour Party at the age of 26 from 1977 to 1978; John McFall, Baron McFall of Alcluith, Senior Deputy Speaker of the House of Lords; Alex Ifeanyichukwu Ekwueme, the first elected Vice-President of Nigeria; Teuea Toatu, Vice-President of Kiribati; Fahri Hamzah, an Indonesian politician and currently a deputy speaker of the People's Representative Council; Omar Abdullah, Indian politician, Chief Minister of J & K state, former Minister of State for External Affairs; Jay Sutherland, Scottish political theorist and activist; Nikos Pappas, Greek Minister of Digital Policy, Telecommunications and Media in Alexis Tsipras' cabinet; David Gordon Mundell, Secretary of the State for Scotland in Cameron and May governments, Conservative MP; Eduardo Doryan, Costa Rican Minister of Education; Ann McKechin, Member of Parliament, former Shadow Secretary of State for Scotland; Jim Murphy, Labour Member of Parliament and former Secretary of State for Scotland; Malcolm Gray Bruce, Baron Bruce of Bennachie, Deputy Leader of Liberal Democrats, Chair of the International Development Committee, Leader of the Liberal Democrats in Scotland, member of House of Lords; Lady Elish Angiolini KC, former Lord Advocate and Principal of St Hugh's College, Oxford; Jim Murphy leader of Labour Party in Scotland in 2014–2015; Lord Bracadale, Senator of the College of Justice, Lord Commissioner of Justiciary; Sir Simon Stevens (healthcare manager) is a Chief Executive of the National Health Service; John Charles Walsham Reith, 1st Baron Reith, the Director-General of the BBC; Michael Peter Evans-Freke, 12th Baron Carbery, an Irish peer; John Ruaridh Grant Mackenzie, 5th Earl of Cromartie, a Scottish peer, the current chief of Clan Mackenzie; Alexander Macmillan, 2nd Earl of Stockton, Conservative MP, member of the House of Lords, grandson of prime minister Harold Macmillan; Nazir Karamagi, Tanzanian Minister of Energy and Minerals, Minister of Industry, Trade and Marketing; Francis Nhema, Zimbabwean Minister of Youth Development, Minister of Environment; Clive Soley, Baron Soley, Labour MP, member of the House of Lords; Khandaker Mosharraf Hossain, Bangladeshi Minister of Local Government and Engineering Department; Ken Kandodo, Malawi's Minister of Finance; Iain Peebles, Lord Bannatyne, Senator of the College of Justice; Ian McAllister, Distinguished Professor of Political Science at the Australian National University; Mark Blyth, Scottish-American political scientist and a professor of international political economy at Brown University; K M Baharul Islam, Professor and Chair of Public Policy and Government Center at Indian Institute of Management Kashipur; Fellow, Indian Institute of Advanced Study; Sandra Currie Osborne, Labour MP, a member of the Foreign Affairs Select Committee; Zulkieflimansyah, Indonesian Governor of West Nusa Tenggara; Muhammad Khan Achakzai, Pakistani Governor of Balochistan; Tommy Sheridan, Scottish politician; Tasmina Ahmed-Sheikh, former MP for Ochil and South Perthshire; Willie Coffey, MSP for Kilmarnock and Irvine Valley; Alice Lau, Member of Parliament for Lanang and Deputy Speaker of Dewan Rakyat

In business: John Barton, Chairman of Next plc and EasyJet; Sir Thomas Hunter, Entrepreneur and Philanthropist; Jim McColl, Scotland's richest man;John Giannandrea, Vice President at Google, head of Google Search; Brian Souter, co-founder of the Stagecoach Group; Sanjay Jha, chief executive officer of Motorola; chief executive officer of Motorola Mobile Devices; Alastair Storey, chief executive officer of Global Foundries, chairman and chief executive officer of Westbury Street Holdings; and Andrew Wyllie, civil engineer, chief executive officer of the Costain Group and president of the Institution of Civil Engineers.

Other alumni include: David Livingstone, explorer in Africa and medical missionary; Tom Devine, historian; Lady Elish Angiolini, the first female Solicitor General and Lord Advocate of Scotland; James McKissack, prominent architect; Alex Kapranos, lead singer of rock band Franz Ferdinand; Lauren Mayberry, lead singer of synthpop band Chvrches; Aileen McGlynn, Scottish paralympic gold medal-winning tandem cyclist and world record holder; Chris Sawyer, creator of RollerCoaster Tycoon and Transport Tycoon video game series; Dean T. Beirne, comedian and finalist of the BBC New Comedy Awards in 2023; Derek Georg Law, British librarian, Emeritus Professor of Informatics, and IFLA medal recipient in 2023.

Academics associated with the university include; James Blyth, generated electrical power from wind; Sir Samuel Curran, inventor of the Scintillation counter; Thomas Graham, chemist who formulated the law of diffusion of gases; Andrew Ure, physician and founder of Andersonian Institution; Matthew Charteris, taught medicine at Anderson's from 1876 to 1880.

James Croll (self-taught scientist) who initially worked as a janitor of the university's museum was awarded an honorary doctorate.

== See also ==
- Armorial of UK universities
- Careers Scotland Space School
- University of Strathclyde Students' Association
- University of Strathclyde Sports Union
- List of UK universities by date of foundation
- List of early modern universities in Europe
