= Kenneth Norrie (legal scholar) =

Scottish legal scholar

Kenneth McKenzie Norrie FRSE is a Scottish legal scholar. He is a professor emeritus of law at the Strathclyde Law School, where he was formerly head of the department.

== Career ==
Norrie's first academic post was a one year lecturer position at the University of Dundee in 1982, then he took up a permanent position at the University of Aberdeen the following year, then moved to Strathclyde in 1990.

Professor Norrie is one of the foremost academics in Scots Family Law and Scots Law of Delict. He has served as an adviser to the Scottish Government in formulating family law legislation.

In June 2017, he was the first witness to give evidence in public at the Scottish Child Abuse Inquiry and provided a report to examine how legal regulations had changed.

Norrie co-authored 'The Law Relating to Parent and Child in Scotland' (ISBN 978-0-414-01810-5), with the book third edition published in 2014. This work was recognised as significant in relation to family law, illuminating Scot's law's fundamental principles and concepts. He wrote 'Reviews of Children's Hearings in Scotland' (ISBN 978-0-414-09882-4), with the fourth edition published in 2022.

Norrie retired from his permanent position at Strathclyde Law School at the end of 2023, taking up an emeritus position at Strathclyde as Professor of Law. In February 2024, he gave a Valedictory Lecture on "40 years of developing LGBT legal rights".

== Awards and honours ==
Norrie was elected as a fellow of the Royal Society of Edinburgh (RSE) in 2002. He was awarded Lecturer of the Year in 2007 by The Firm Magazine.
