= Strathclyde Law School =

Law school in Glasgow, Scotland

Coordinates: 55.863°N 4.241°W

- Type: Law school
- Established: 1964
- Affiliations: University of Strathclyde
- Head: Adelyn Wilson
- Location: Glasgow, Scotland
- Website: www.strath.ac.uk/humanities/lawschool/

Strathclyde Law School was established in 1964 and operates within the Faculty of Humanities & Social Sciences at the University of Strathclyde, in Glasgow, Scotland.

The Law School currently operates from the Lord Hope Building (named after Lord Hope of Craighead, former Chancellor of the University and former Deputy President of the UK Supreme Court).

The Law School offers a full range of undergraduate and postgraduate taught and research degrees.

== Research Centres ==
- The Centre for Professional Legal Studies
- The Centre for Law, Crime and Justice
- The Centre for the Study of Human Rights Law
- The Centre for Internet Law and Policy
- Strathclyde Centre for Environmental Law and Governance

== Teaching awards ==
Rankings
National rankings
- Complete (2027): 11
- Guardian (2027): 66
- Times / Sunday Times (2027): 10=

According to The Complete University Guide, Strathclyde Law School is in the UK's top 10 (2020). According to Times Higher Education, the University of Strathclyde was placed 76th best in law globally among universities in 2018.

Kenneth Norrie was awarded Scottish Law Lecturer of the Year 2007 at the Law Awards of Scotland, and the Law School obtained more nominations than any other law school in 2007, with Norrie, Robson and Rodger being nominated.

The nominations for the 2008 award also included two Strathclyde Law School lecturers: John Blackie and Donald Nicolson.

In the 2009 New Year Honours List Alan Paterson was awarded an OBE for services to law and legal education. In 2011, Donald Nicolson was appointed an OBE for services to the legal profession.

== The Law Clinic ==
University of Strathclyde Law Clinic
- Formation: 2003
- Location: Graham Hills Building, University of Strathclyde
- Key people: Other officers:Donald Nicolson (Director) Jacob Hay and Fergus Lawrie (Student Directors)
- Parent organization: Strathclyde Law School
- Website: lawclinic.org.uk

The University of Strathclyde Law Clinic was set up in October 2003 by Donald Nicolson, and was the first University-run Law Clinic in Scotland. The Law Clinic offers free legal advice and help to residents of Glasgow and the surrounding area who cannot afford a solicitor or do not qualify for legal aid. Dealing mainly with employment law and small claims issues, the Clinic has branched out in recent years into a variety of projects including an immigration unit, the Scottish Women's Rights Centre, and schools and prisons projects.

The current Law Clinic offices are located on Level 5 of the Graham Hills Building, on the University of Strathclyde John Anderson campus.

In 2016, the University of Strathclyde Law School won the pro bono award at the Scott and Co. Law Awards in Edinburgh. The Law Clinic has also won awards at the Law Works and Attorney General Awards in London: in 2016 Fergus Lawrie was given the prize for best contribution by an individual student, a prize that was also won on a previous occasion (in 2014) by Jacky Wall.

The University of Strathclyde Law Clinic is now the biggest law clinic in the UK and is primarily run by a committee of students.

== Mooting ==
The Law School has an active mooting society, which organises an internal competition for Strathclyde students and competes in various Scottish and UK external competitions.

== Alumni ==
- Elish Angiolini QC, former Lord Advocate
- William Bain, former MP for Glasgow North East
- Alastair Campbell, Lord Bracadale, Senator of the College of Justice
- Dougie Donnelly, Journalist and Broadcaster for the BBC
- Annabel Goldie, former MSP and former Leader of the Scottish Conservative Party
- Paul Laverty, Screenwriter
- Paul G. McBride QC, former Vice-Chairman of the Faculty of Advocates
- Ann McKechin, former MP for Glasgow North
- Pauline McNeill, MSP for Glasgow Kelvin
- Lauren Mayberry, Scottish singer with the band Chvrches
- Margaret Mitchell, MSP for Central Scotland
- Nicola Irvine, Dean of Royal Faculty of Procurators in Glasgow
- Aamer Anwar, Rector of University of Glasgow, Lawyer of the Year 2017, Solicitor of the Year 2016
- Iain Peebles, Lord Bannatyne, Senator of the College of Justice
- Tommy Sheridan Scottish politician

== See also ==
- University of Strathclyde
- Legal education in the United Kingdom
- Scots Law
