= Iain Peebles, Lord Bannatyne =

The Honourable Lord Bannatyne

Senator of the College of Justice
- In office 5 November 2008 – 2020
- Nominated by: Alex Salmond; As First Minister
- Appointed by: Elizabeth II

Personal details
- Born: Iain Alexander Scott Peebles; August 1954 (age 72)
- Education: University of Strathclyde
- Website: Scottish Courts Service

Iain Alexander Scott Peebles, Lord Bannatyne (born August 1954) was a Senator of the College of Justice, a judge of the High Court of Justiciary and Court of Session in Scotland from 2008 until 2020.

== Career ==
After studying at the School of Law of the University of Strathclyde, Peebles was admitted to the Faculty of Advocates in 1979, and appointed Queen's Counsel in 1993. He was appointed as a temporary Sheriff in 1991, a full-time Sheriff in 1995, and began sitting as a commercial sheriff in 1999. He was appointed a temporary High Court judge in 2003, serving until his elevation to the Bench in 2008. He was a member of the Sheriff Courts Rules Council from 2001 to 2007, and joint-chairman of the IT Committee of the Sheriff and Court of Session Rules Council.

== The Bench ==
On 5 November 2008, the Scottish Executive announced he had been appointed to the Outer House of the Court of Session as Lord Bannatyne, filling the vacancy which had arisen from the death of Lord Johnston in June that year. His appointment came at the same time as those of Paul Cullen, Lord Pentland and Valerie Stacey, Lady Stacey. The men's decisions to adopt titles other than their own surnames drew comment in the press as straying from tradition.

== Notable cases ==
Notable cases overseen by Lord Bannatyne include the trial of Scotland's largest paedophile ring, in which eight men were found guilty of more than 50 charges, including the abuse of infants. The ring held more than 125,000 images, ringleaders included James Rennie, the chief executive of LGBT Youth Scotland.

== See also ==
- List of Senators of the College of Justice
