= Glasgow Cathedral (disambiguation) =

The church commonly known as Glasgow Cathedral is the Church of Scotland High Kirk of Glasgow otherwise known as St. Mungo's Cathedral.

Other cathedrals in Glasgow are:

- St Andrew's Cathedral, Glasgow or Metropolitan Cathedral Church of Saint Andrew (Catholic)
- St Mary's Cathedral, Glasgow (Episcopal)
- Greek Orthodox Cathedral of St. Luke, Glasgow
