= James Sellars =

Scottish architect (1843–1888)

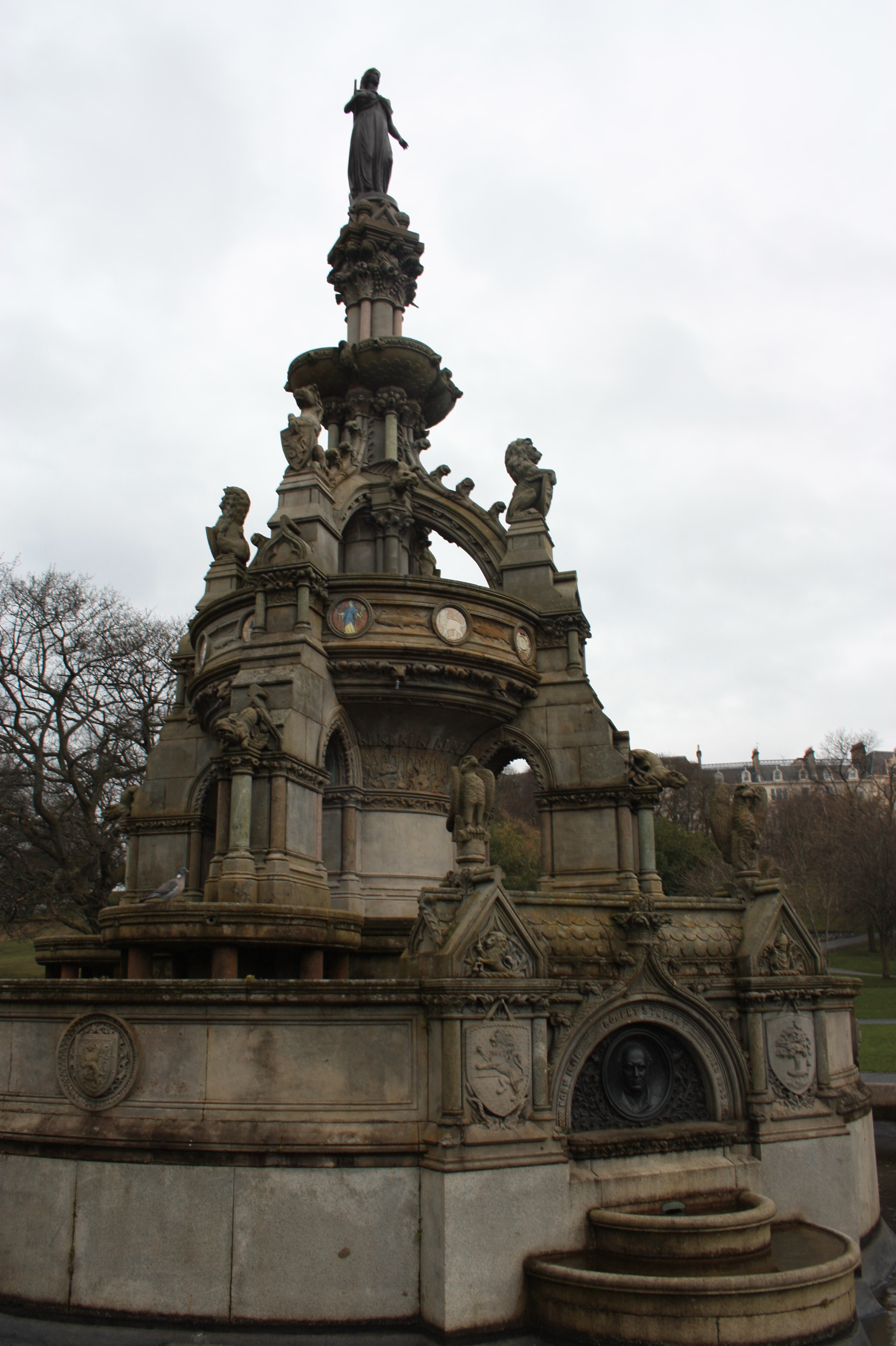
Memorial Fountain to Lord Provost James Stewart (1811-1866) by James Sellars, Kelvingrove Park

James Sellars (2 December 1843 – 9 October 1888) was a Scottish architect who was heavily influenced by the work of Alexander Greek Thomson.

== Life ==
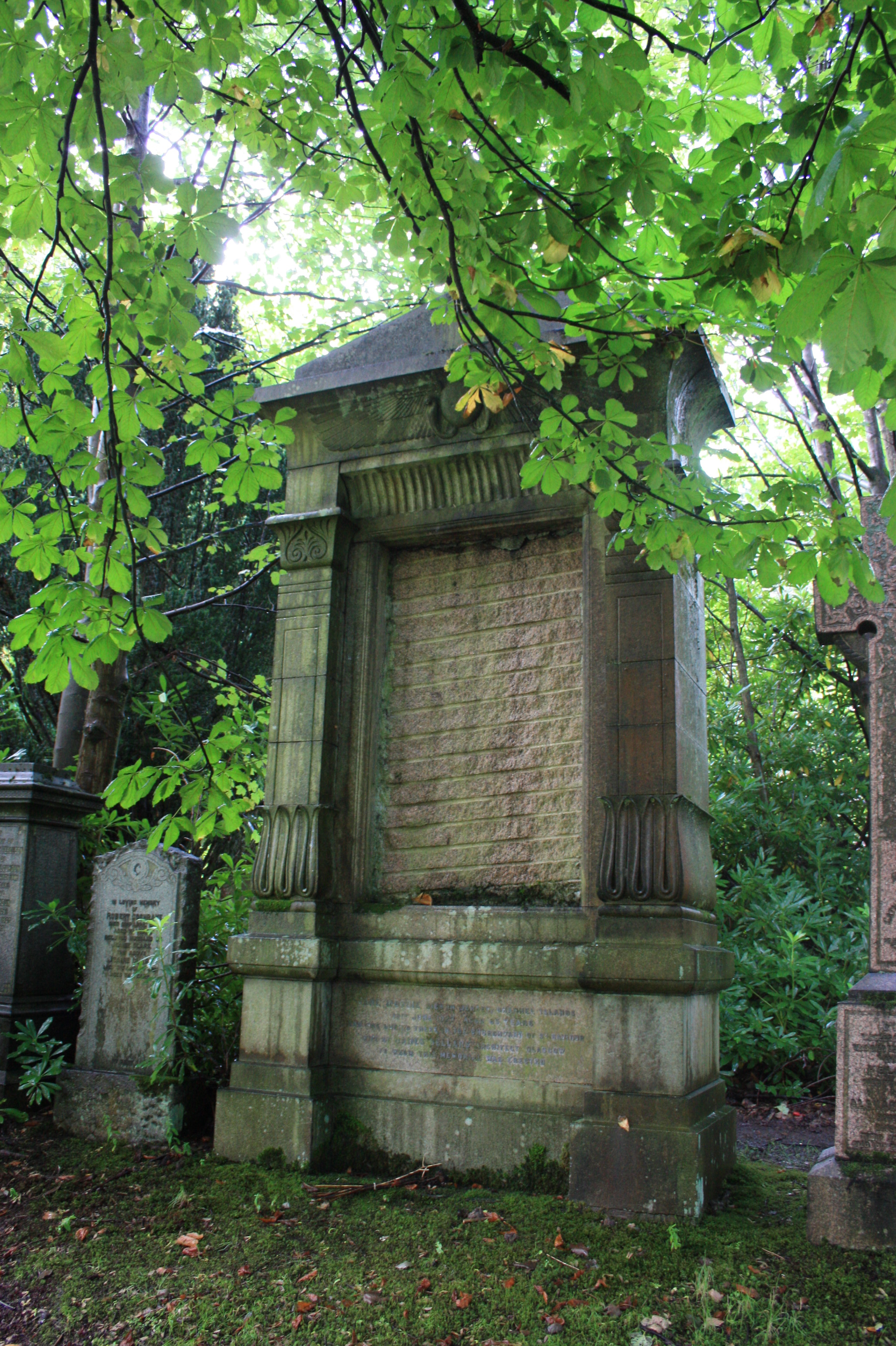
The grave of James Sellars, Lambhill Cemetery, Glasgow

Sellars was born in the Gorbals in Glasgow, son of James Sellars, house factor and Elizabeth McDonald. He was articled to H & D Barclay from the age of 13 and stayed there until he was 21 when he then moved to the employment of James Hamilton. Sellars was one of the designers commissioned by the Saracen Foundry to work on a set of standard designs for a series of decorative iron works, for example railings, drinking fountains, bandstands, street lamps, pre-fabricated buildings and architectural features. In later years he worked in partnership with Campbell Douglas and John Keppie.

Sellars was married to Jane Moodie (1844-1927). He died on 9 October 1888 of blood-poisoning contracted from a nail piercing his boot whilst on site. Sellars is buried in Lambhill Cemetery with his monument by his colleague John Keppie sculpted by his friend James Pittendrigh Macgillivray whom he worked with on several projects. The grave sits on axis with the main east–west path at its western end, but is set behind more modern graves and partially obscured by trees. It was originally the focal point of the main path. The main inscription panel is missing.

== Works ==
- Cove Castle (1867)
- Stewart Memorial Fountain, Kelvingrove Park (1872)
- Mitchell Theatre (1873)
- Greek Orthodox Cathedral of St Luke (1877)
- Kelvinside Academy (1877)
- New Club, 144-146 West George Street, Glasgow (1879)
- Glasgow Victoria Infirmary (1882)
- Frasers, Buchanan Street (1883)
- various buildings at the International Exhibition of Science, Art and Industry (1888)
- Anderson College of Medicine, 56 Dumbarton Road, Partick (1888–89). Died during construction. Works completed by John Keppie (1862–1945) as a setting-up commission for the newly formed Honeyman and Keppie (Keppie was Sellars' head draughtsman).
- Kelvinside Hillhead Parish Church (1876), Observatory Road, Glasgow
