= Kelvinside Hillhead Parish Church, Glasgow =

Kelvinside Hillhead Church
- Kelvinside Hillhead Parish Church
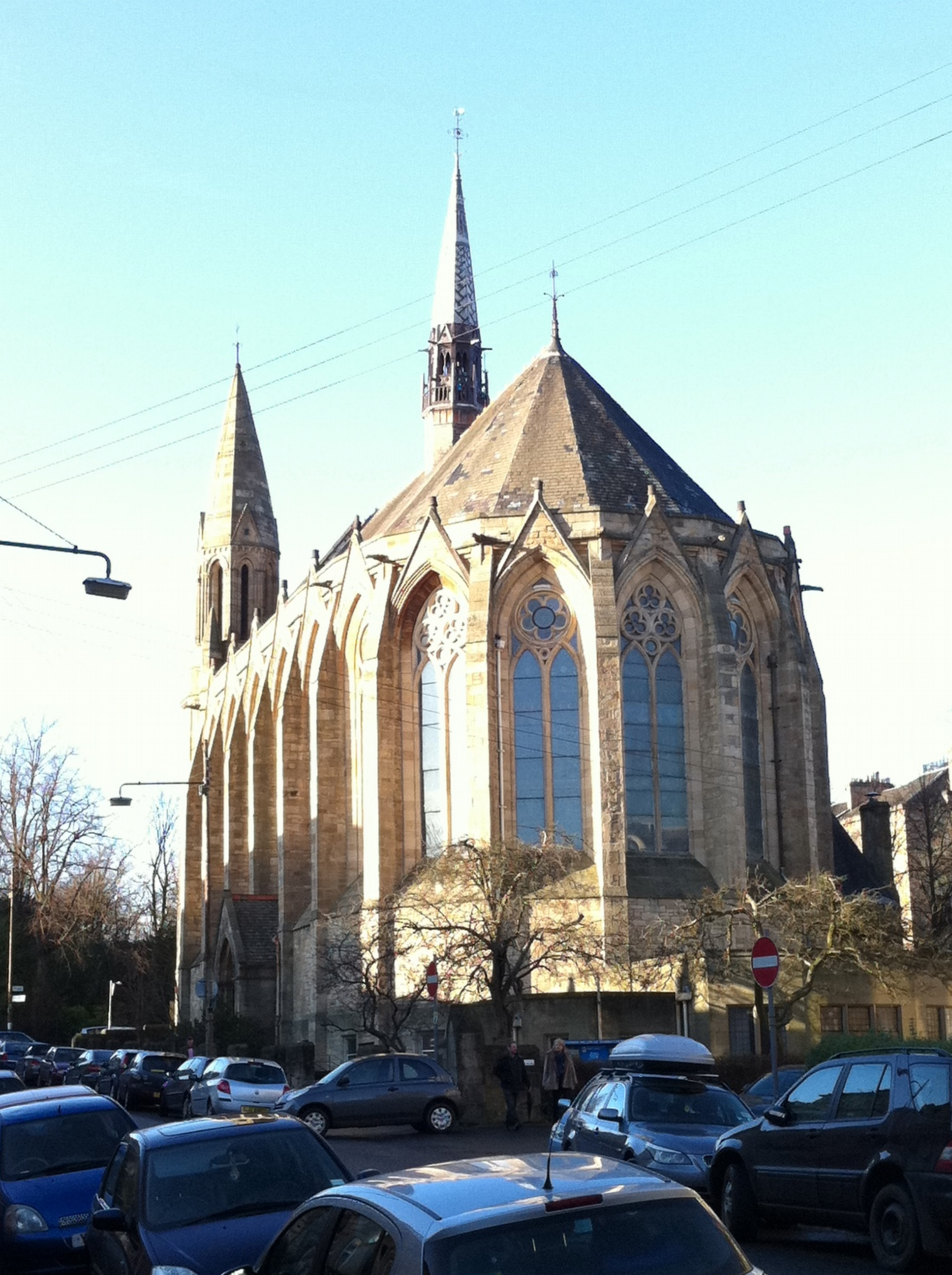
- Kelvinside Hillhead Church
- 55°52′39″N 4°17′36″W
- Location: Glasgow
- Country: Scotland
- Denomination: Church of Scotland
- Website: Kelvinside Hillhead Parish

History
- Former name: Hillhead Parish Church
- Status: Active

Architecture
- Functional status: Parish church
- Architect: James Sellar
- Completed: 8 October 1876

Administration
- Parish: Kelvinside and Hillhead

Listed Building – Category A
- Designated: 15 December 1970
- Reference no.: LB32584

Kelvinside Hillhead Parish Church, originally Hillhead Parish Church, is a parish church of the Church of Scotland, serving the Hillhead and Kelvinside areas of Glasgow, Scotland. It is within the Church of Scotland's Presbytery of Glasgow.

== History ==
Hillhead expanded rapidly during the second half of the 19th century, especially following the relocation of the University of Glasgow to Gilmorehill in the 1870s. The Church of Scotland responded by constructing a temporary church in a field in front of what is now Athole Gardens in Hillhead. This corrugated iron church was opened in 1871.

The congregation soon outgrew the temporary building and a decision to construct a permanent church was taken. Finding a suitable site was problematic, partly due to old mineworkings, but the new church was opened on 8 October 1876. At first, the congregation operated under the supervision of the Kirk Session of Govan Old Parish Church, but in 1882 became a "quoad sacra" parish with its own Kirk Session (i.e. a parish for church purposes, but not a civil parish for local government purposes).

Other churches were also constructed nearby. These included Belmont Church, which united with Hillhead Parish Church in 1950. In 1978, Belmont and Hillhead Parish Church united with Kelvinside (Botanic Gardens) Church, becoming Kelvinside Hillhead Parish Church (and using the old Hillhead Parish Church buildings in Observatory Road).

After standing derelict for four years, the former Kelvinside Parish Church (Botanic Gardens), was converted into the "Òran Mór" restaurant, entertainment and music venue, which opened in 2004. The refurbishment features a ceiling designed by the Glaswegian writer and artist Alasdair Gray.

== Building ==
The building was designed by the architect James Sellars and completed in 1876. It is modelled on Sainte-Chapelle in Paris. The church is located in Observatory Road, Hillhead. It is a Category A listed building.

The nine windows with stained glass panels in the main body of the church include a window by Victorian artist Sir Edward Burne-Jones. The most recent window, "Te Deum Laudamus," was created by Sadie McLellan and installed in 1958.

The gallery organ was built in 1876 by Henry Willis; it was twice rebuilt further by Willis and Sons in 1906 and 1930. The original installation was in the recess at the back of the west gallery under the rose window, as designed by the organist Dr A.E. Peace. In 1906 the choir organ was enclosed and the action was changed to tubular-pneumatic. In 1930 there was a major refit of pipes, which were moved to their present locations.

The building was completely reroofed in 2017–2018 in a project overseen by Page & Park Architects. Improvements to flashing, pointing and guttering were also made.

== Ministry ==
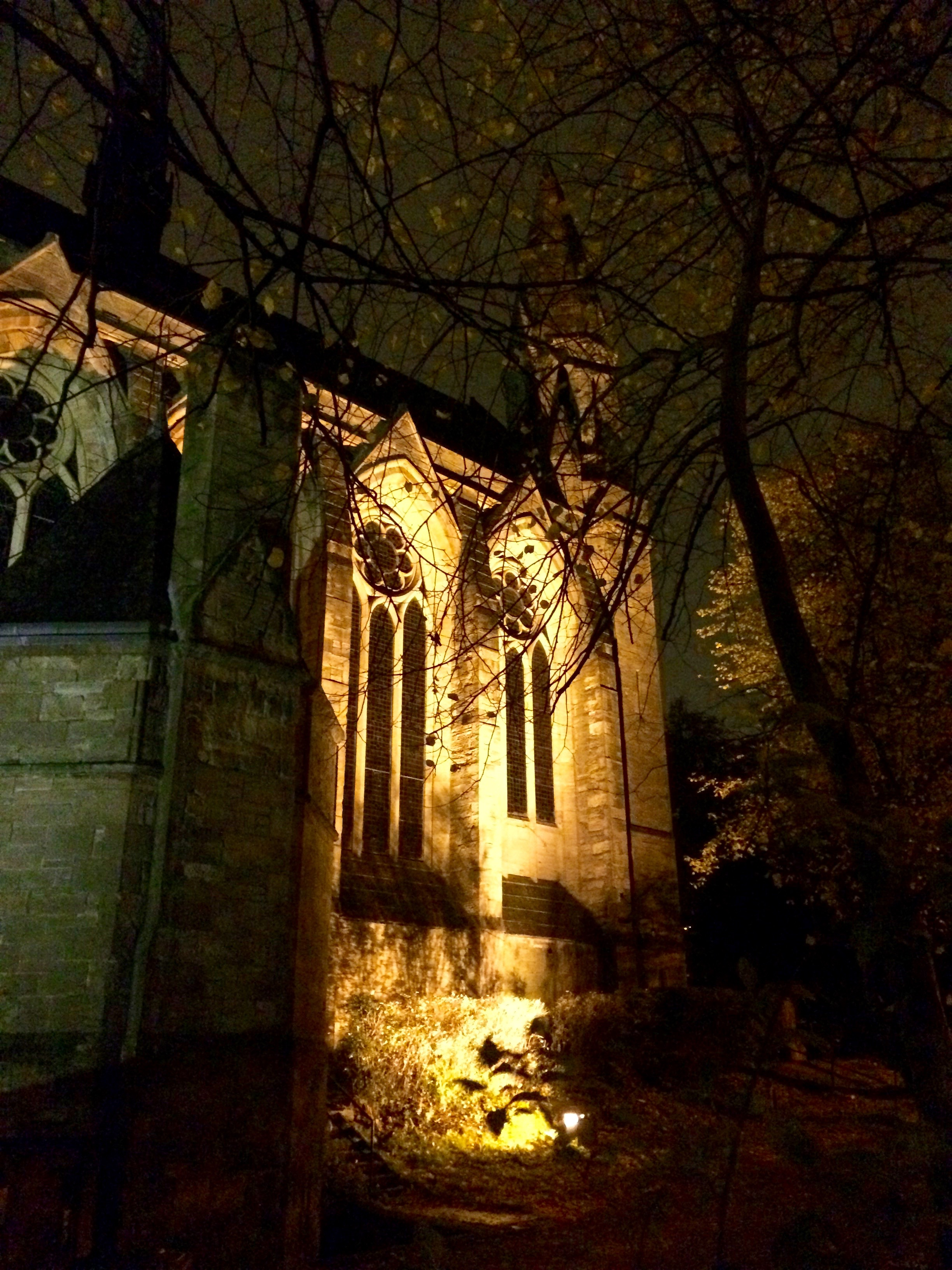
Kelvinside Hillhead Parish Church

The church ministry team currently consists of Doug Gay (Principal of Trinity College, Glasgow and Senior Lecturer in Practical Theology at the University of Glasgow), John Drane, Olive Fleming Drane (Professor at Fuller Theological Seminary), and Carys Parker White.

== See also ==
- List of Church of Scotland parishes

=== Other churches nearby ===
- Jordanhill Parish Church (Church of Scotland)
- Kelvin Stevenson Memorial Church (Church of Scotland)
- Knightswood St. Margaret's Parish Church (Church of Scotland)
- St. John's Renfield Church (Church of Scotland)
- St. Luke's Cathedral (Orthodox)
- St. Mary's Cathedral (Episcopalian)
- Kelvin West Parish Church (Church of Scotland)
