= James Pittendrigh Macgillivray =

Scottish sculptor (1856-1938)

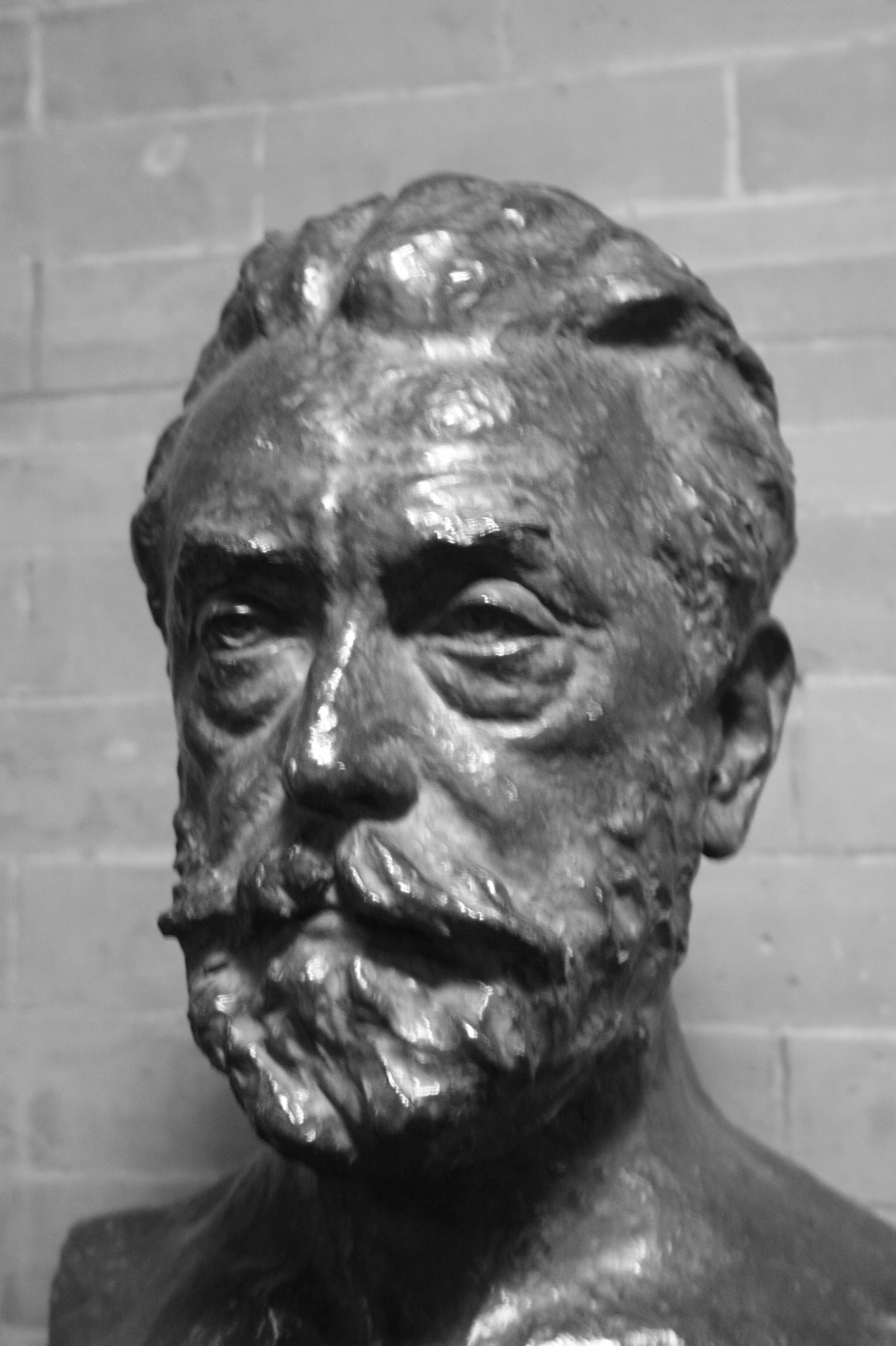
James Pittendrigh Macgillivray by Benno Schotz 1922

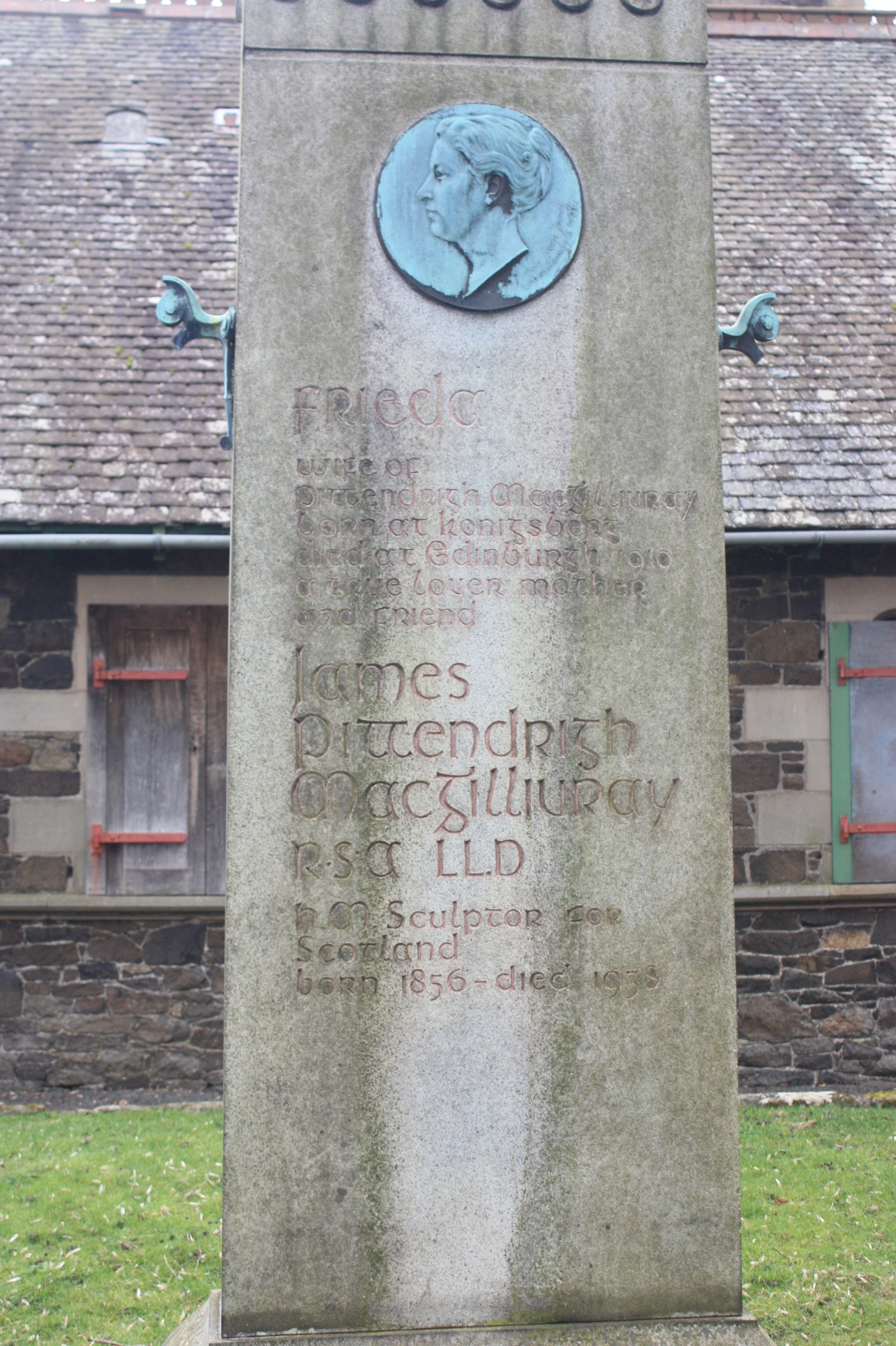
The grave of James Pittendrigh MacGillivray, Gogar Churchyard

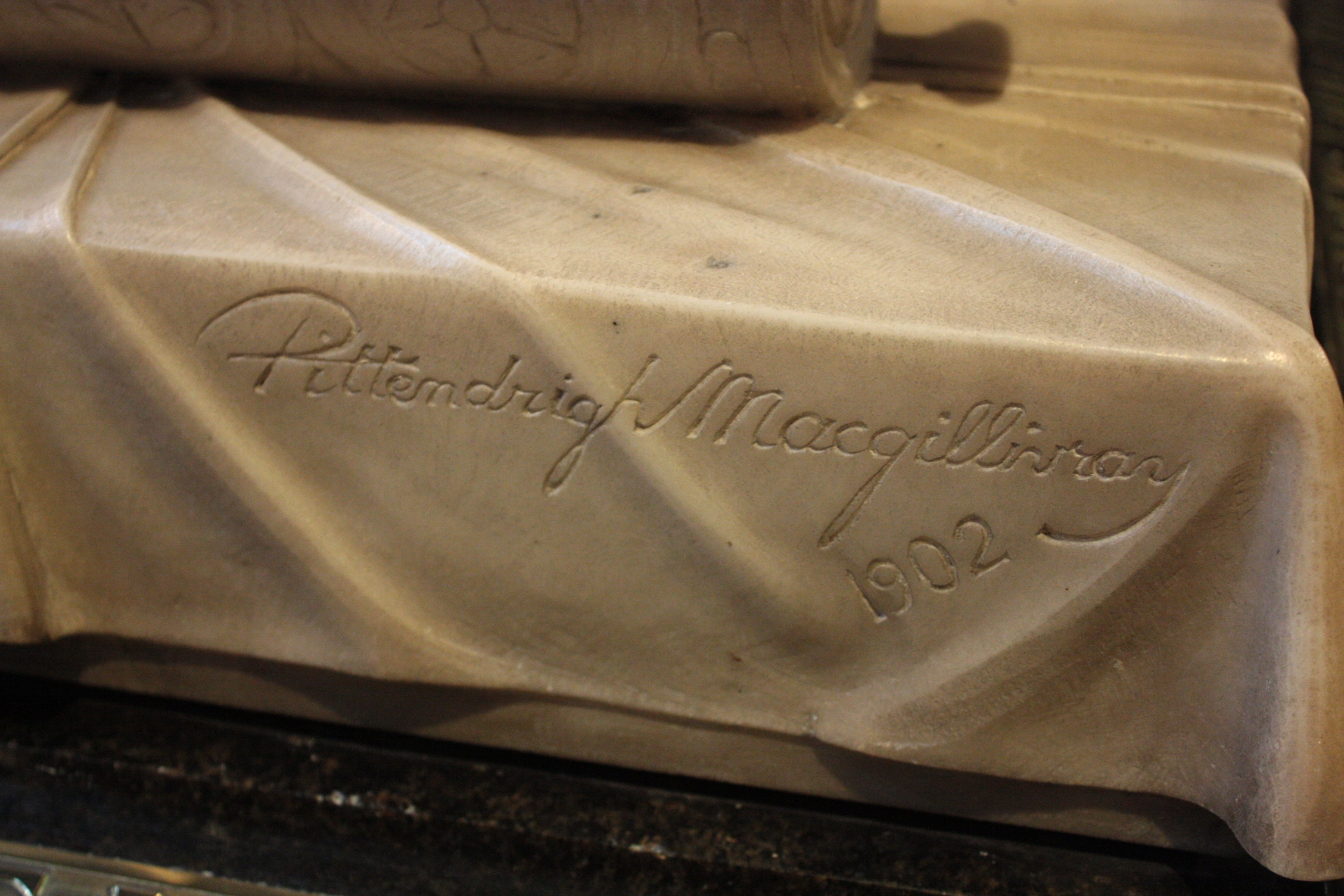
MacGillivray's sculpted signature

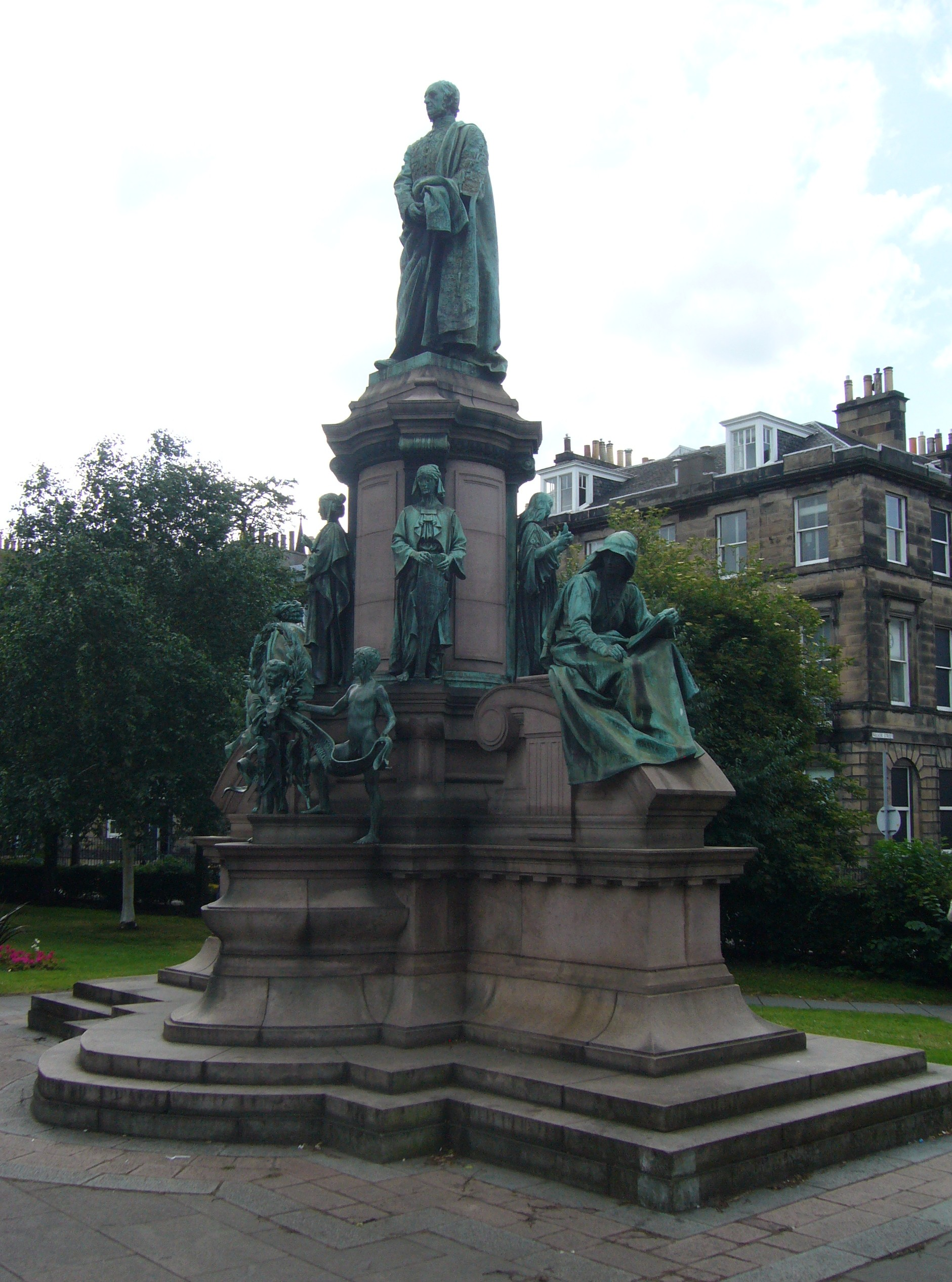
The William Gladstone Monument, Edinburgh. An example of MacGillivray's work.

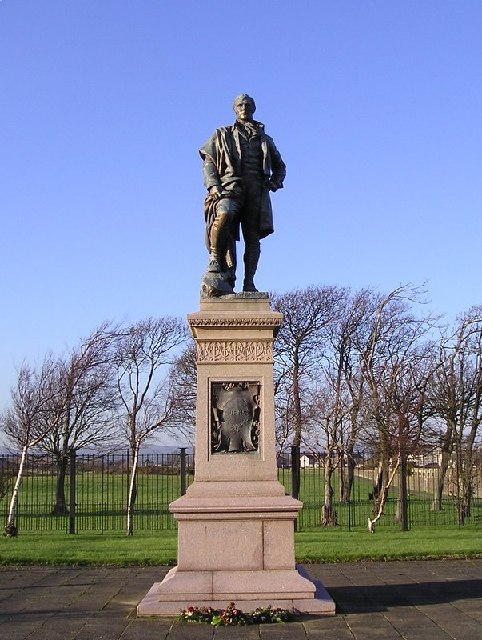
Statue of Burns in Irvine

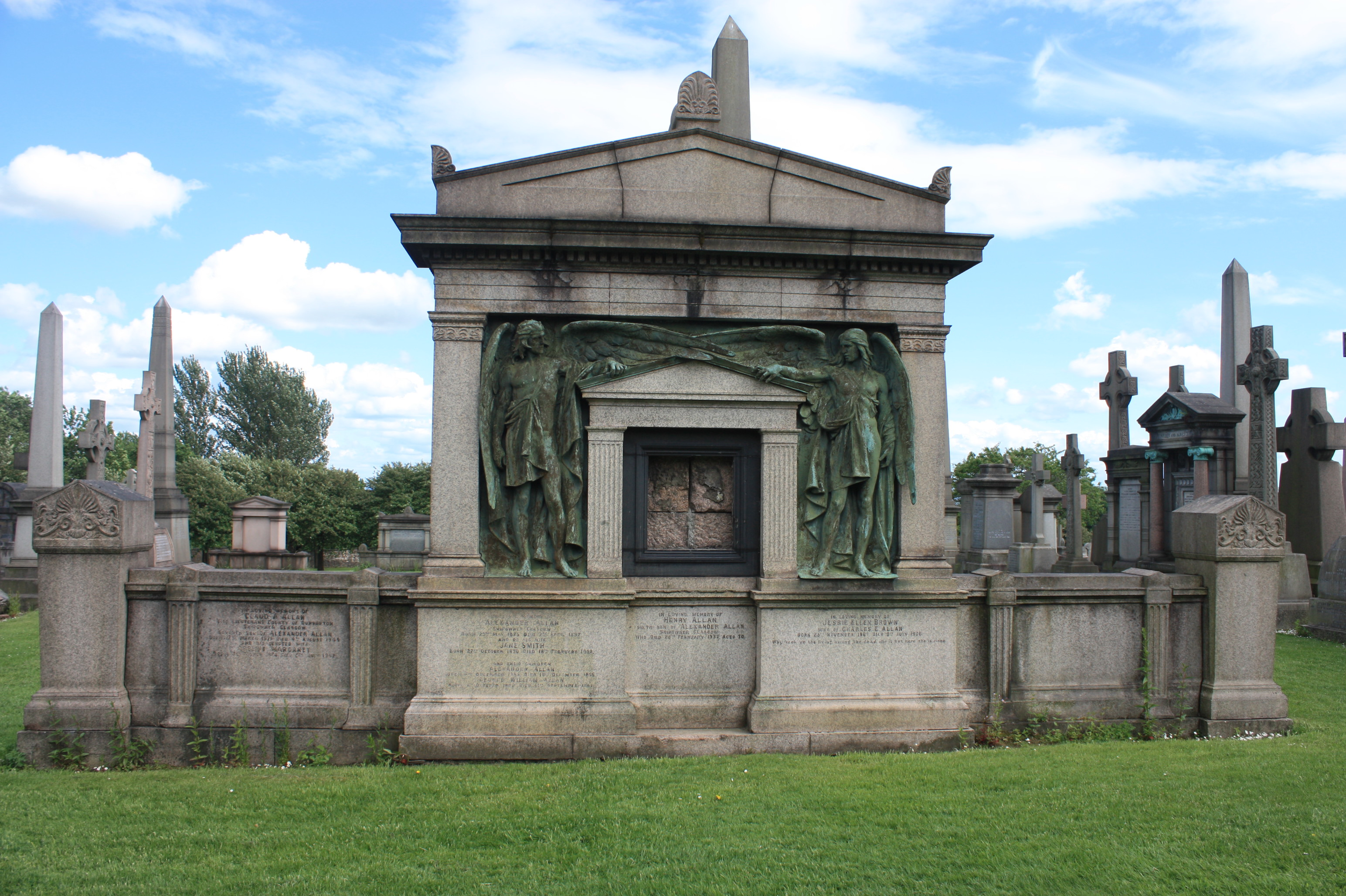
The grave of Alexander and Hugh Allan, shipbuilders, Glasgow Necropolis

James Pittendrigh MacGillivray (1856 – 29 April 1938) was a Scottish sculptor. He was also a keen artist, musician and poet. He was born in Inverurie, Aberdeenshire, the son of a sculptor, and studied under William Brodie and John Mossman. His works include public statues of Robert Burns in Irvine, Lord Byron in Aberdeen, the 3rd Marquess of Bute in Cardiff, John Knox in Edinburgh's St Giles Cathedral, and William Ewart Gladstone in Coates Crescent Gardens, Edinburgh.

After training under Brodie in Edinburgh, Macgillivray worked for nine years in Glasgow as assistant to Mossman and James Steel. In 1894 he returned to Edinburgh, where he lived at "Ravelston Elms" on Murrayfield Road.

Macgillivray was a Scottish nationalist, and associated both with Patrick Geddes' Fin de Siècle Scottish cultural revival and Hugh MacDiarmid's later Scottish Renaissance movement. He contributed illustrations to the Spring and Autumn volumes of The Evergreen: A Northern Seasonal published by Patrick Geddes and Colleagues in Edinburgh in 1895. He became a member of the Scottish Arts Club in the late 1890s.

His work was influenced greatly by Pictish designs, and these are on display in Perth. Alloway village hall contains his sculpture of Robert Burns.

He became a member of the Royal Scottish Academy in 1901 and designed the Academicians' robes. He was appointed the King's Sculptor in Ordinary for Scotland in 1921. He was influential in the development of Arts teaching in Scotland, being associated with the establishment of Edinburgh College of Art. In 1904 he wrote a Special Report on the Schools of Art in Scotland and in 1906 a report on the creation of a Municipal Art School in Edinburgh, drawing on his knowledge of practice in Brussels, Berlin and Paris.

MacGillivray also published two volumes of poetry in Scots – Pro Patria in 1915 and Bog Myrtle and Peat Reek in 1922.

He was a member of Glasgow Art Club for over fifty years, closely associating himself with the Glasgow Boys. On the evening of 28 October 1932 the Club hosted a dinner in his honour (with fellow honoree fellow club member James B. Anderson ARSA.) He was also a co-founder with James Paterson, E.A. Hornel and George Henry of "The Scottish Arts Review".

He is buried in the tiny Gogar Kirkyard, close to the Royal Bank of Scotland headquarters at Gogarburn, with his wife Frieda who died in 1910. The grave is of his own design, depicting them side by side. Their daughters Ina MacGillivray (1887–1917) and Ehrna (1892–1966) are buried with them.

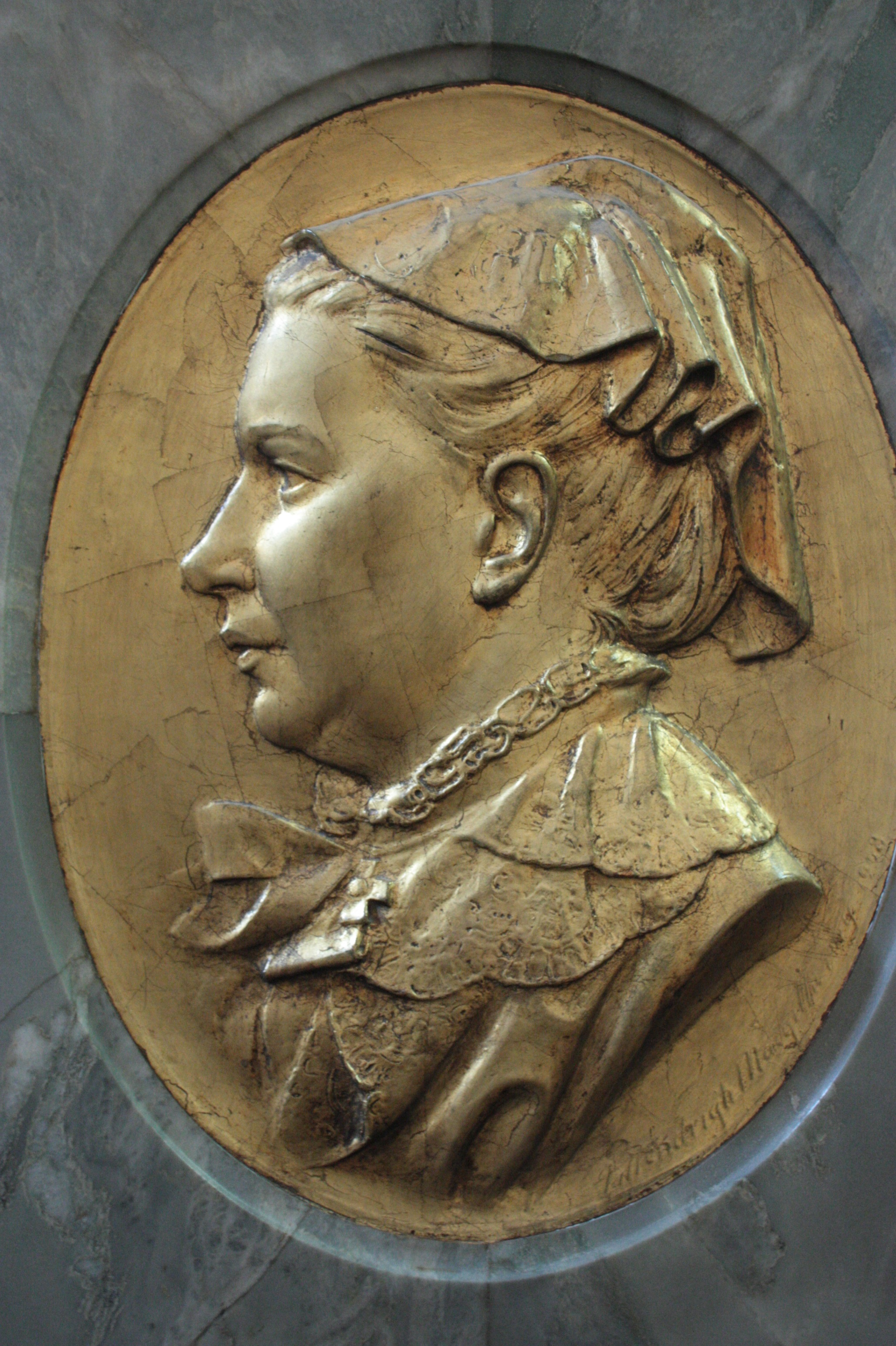
memorial to Mrs Oliphant in St Giles Cathedral Edinburgh by Macgillivray

== Pupils ==
Pupils include sculptor Ottilie Maclaren Wallace.

== Notable works ==
Gladstone Memorial, Edinburgh

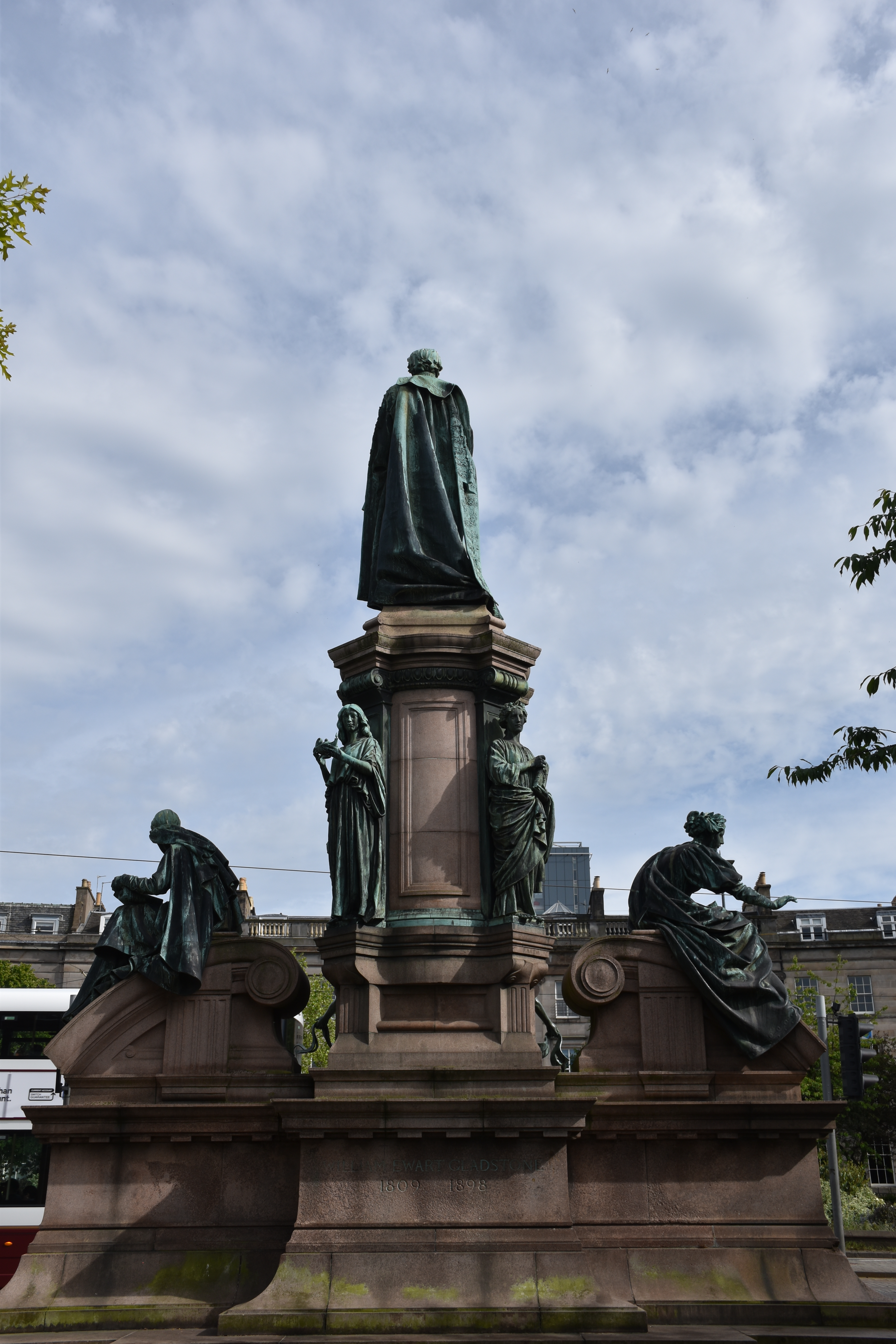
Full view seen from Walker Street

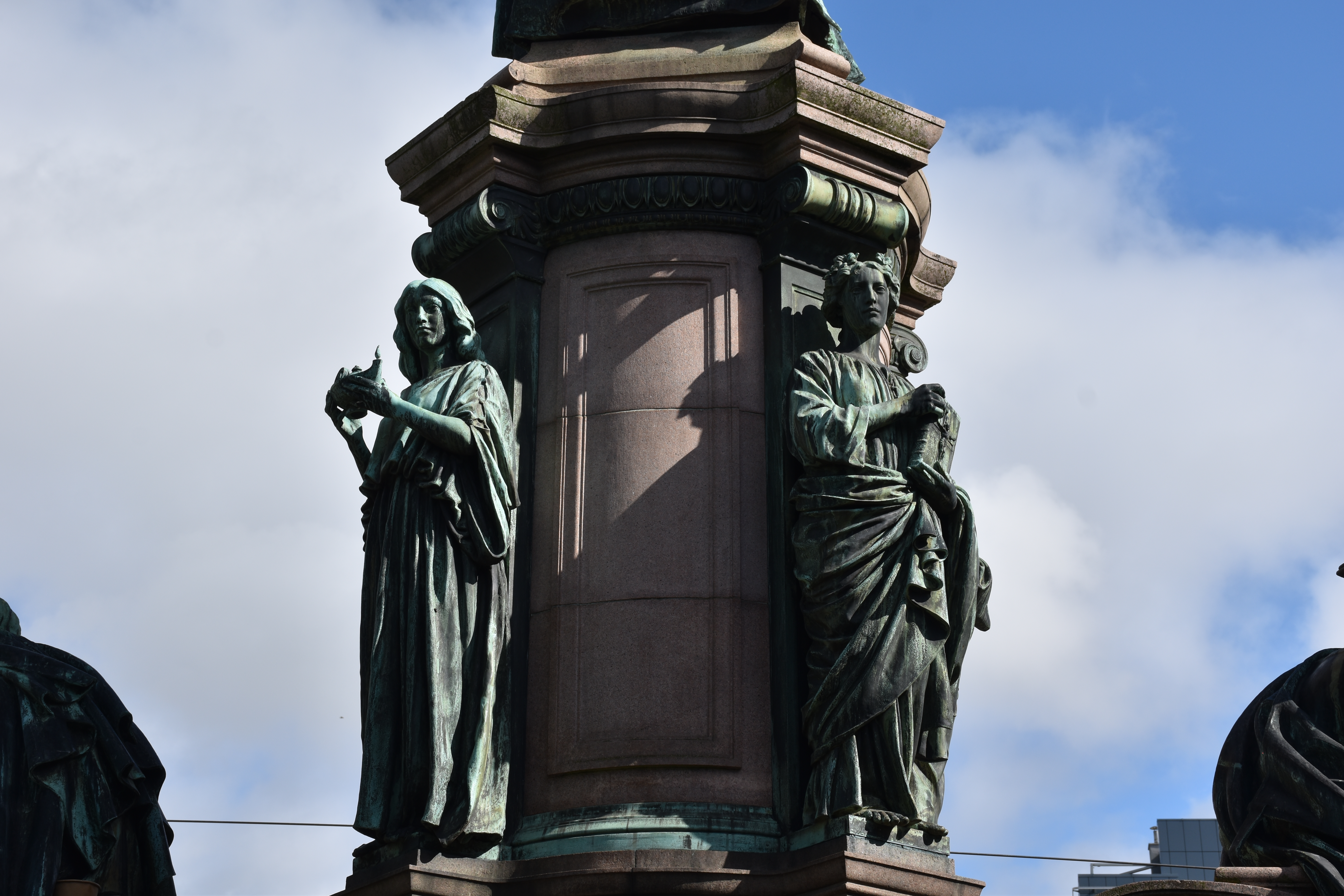
Allegories of Vitality and Faith

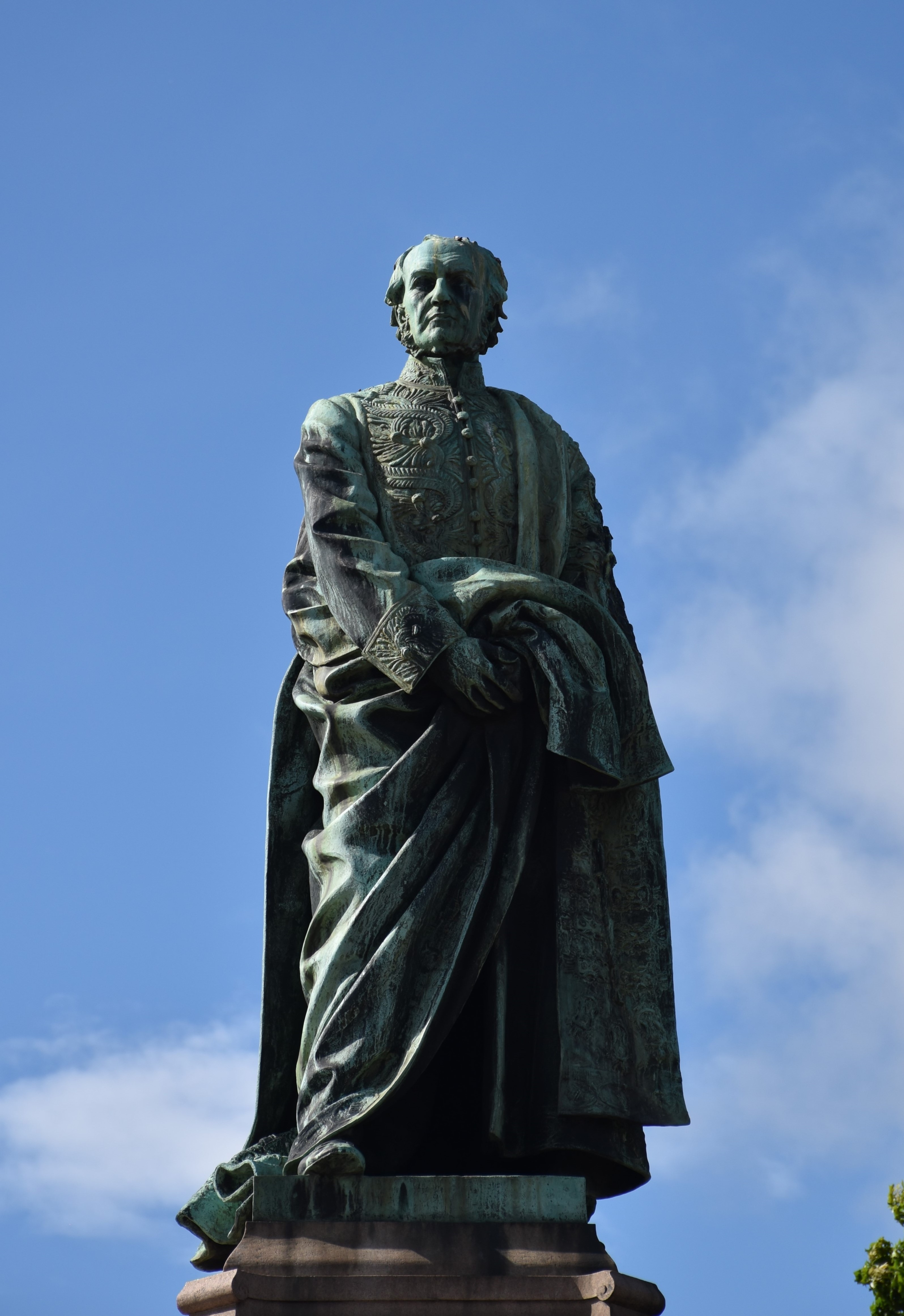
Portrait of William Ewart Gladstone

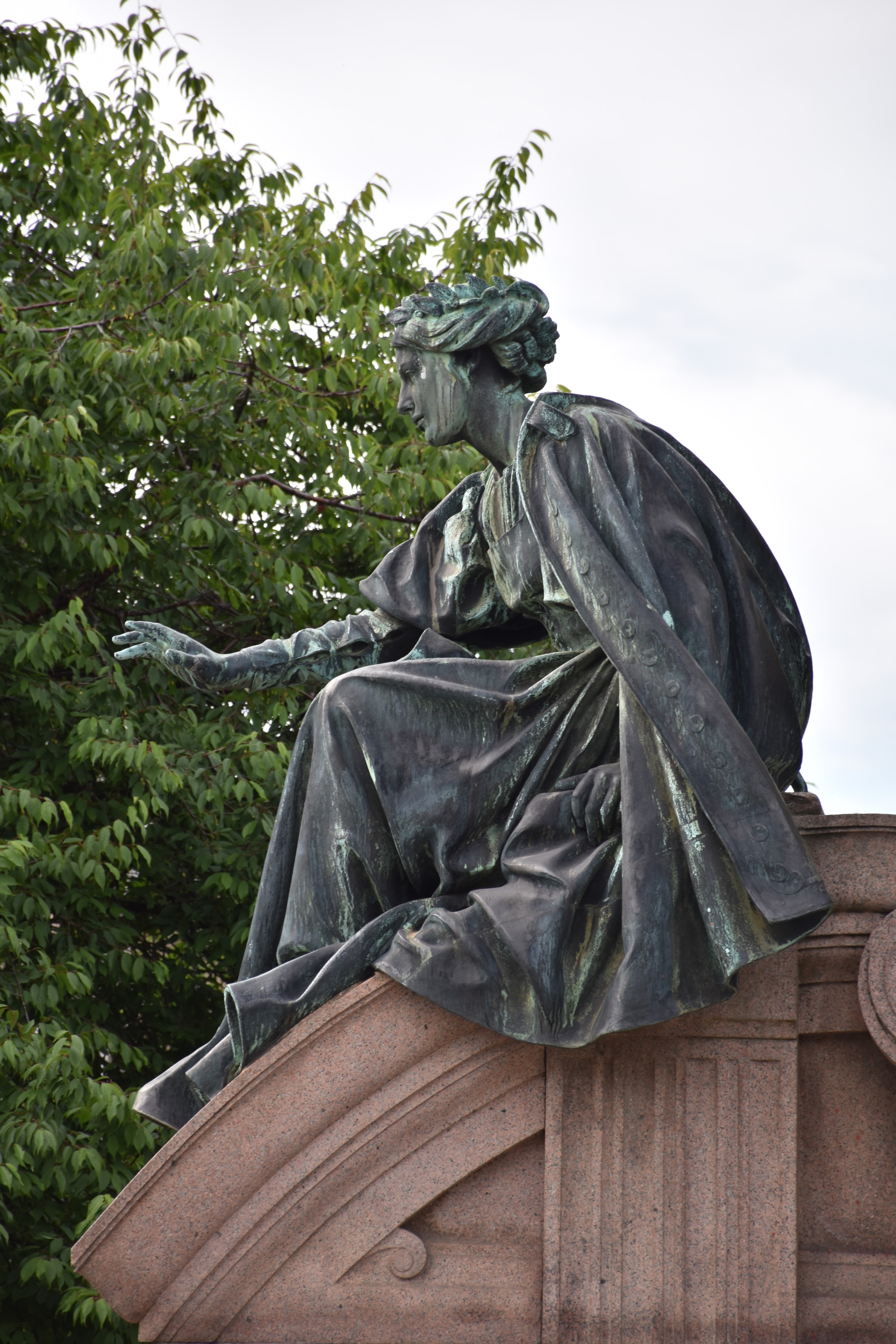
Eloquentia, allegory of. View from Shandwick Place

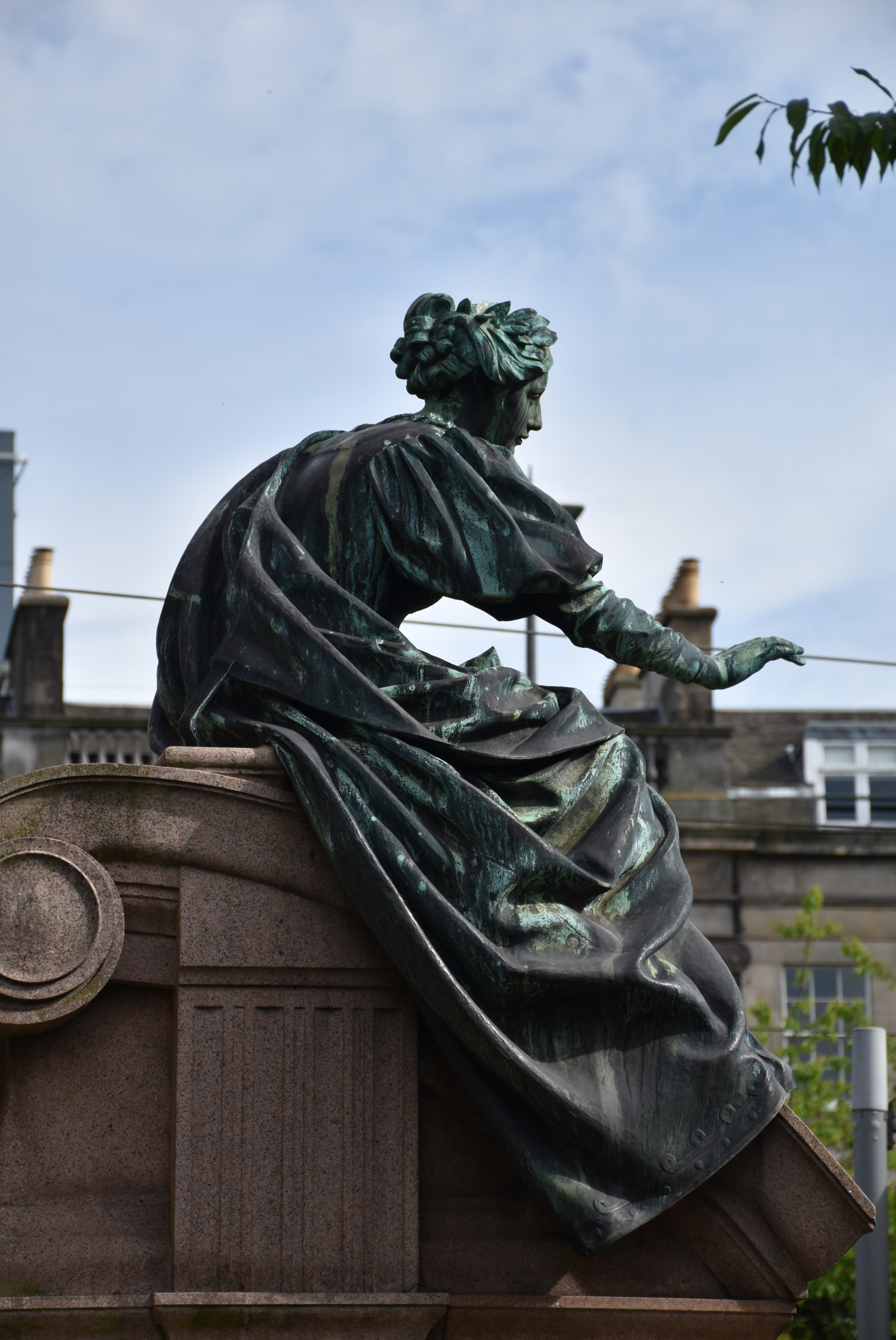
Eloquentia, allegory of. View from Coates Crescent

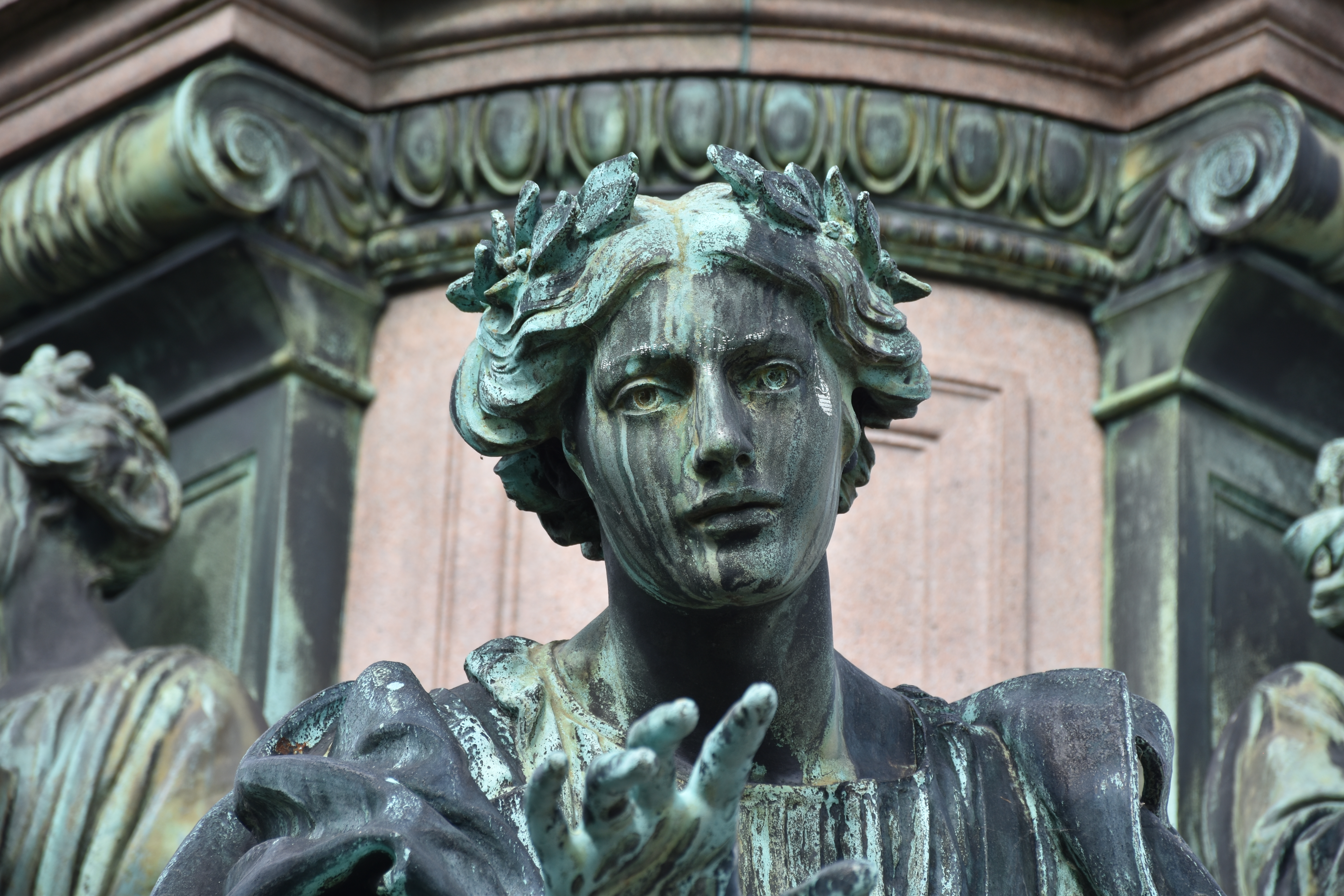
Eloquentia, detail

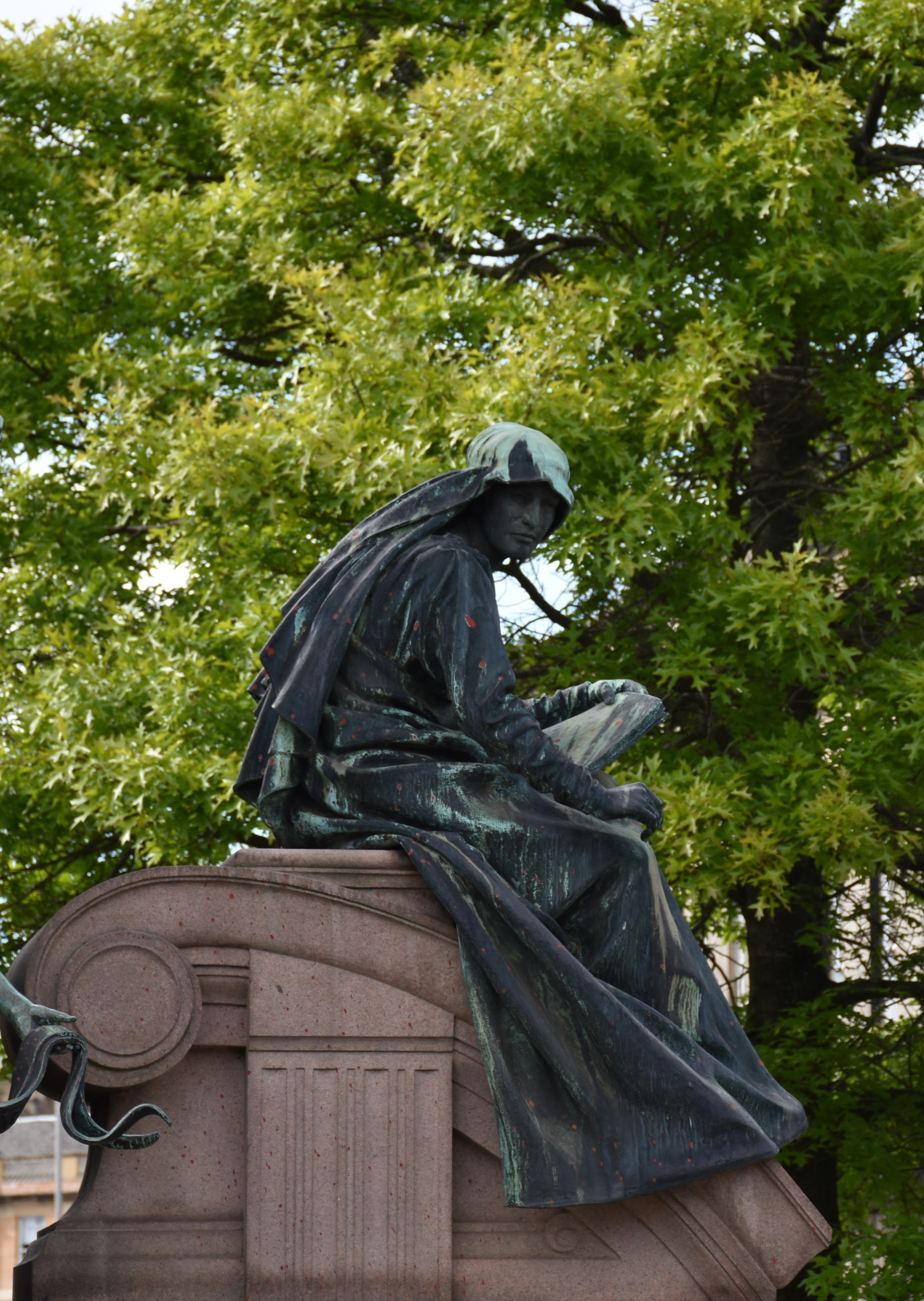
Historia, allegory of. View from Shandwick Place

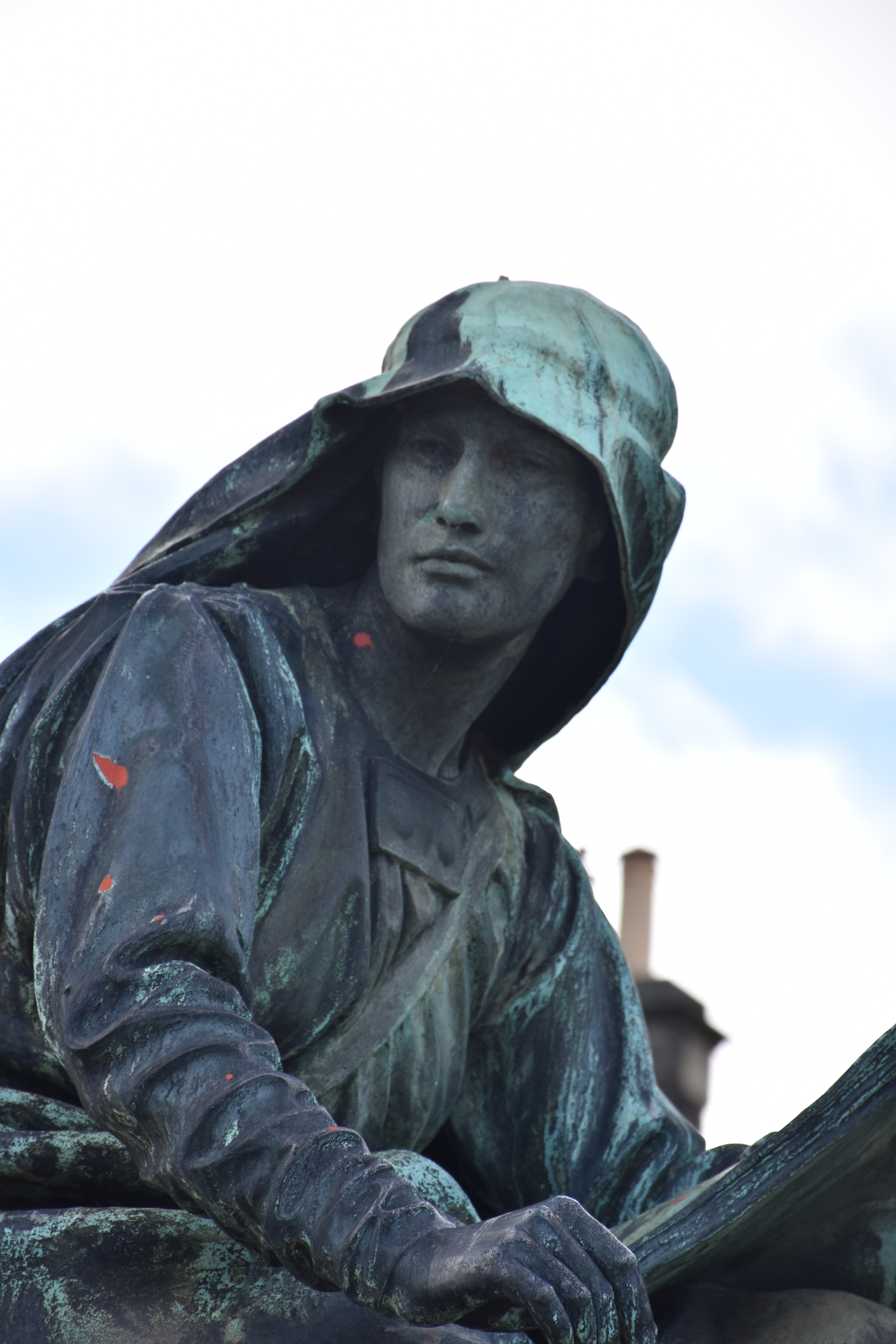
Historia, detail

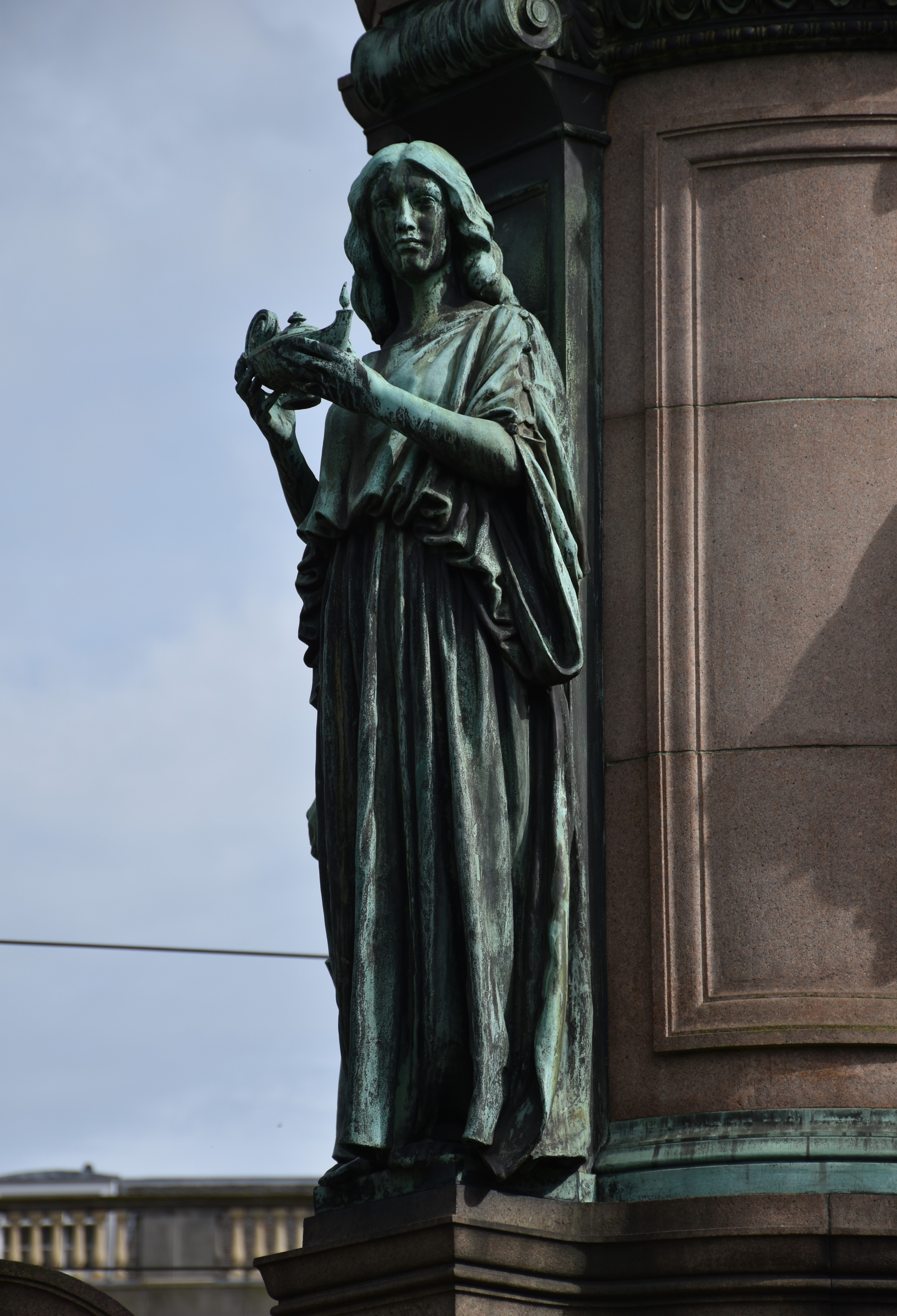
Vitality, allegory of

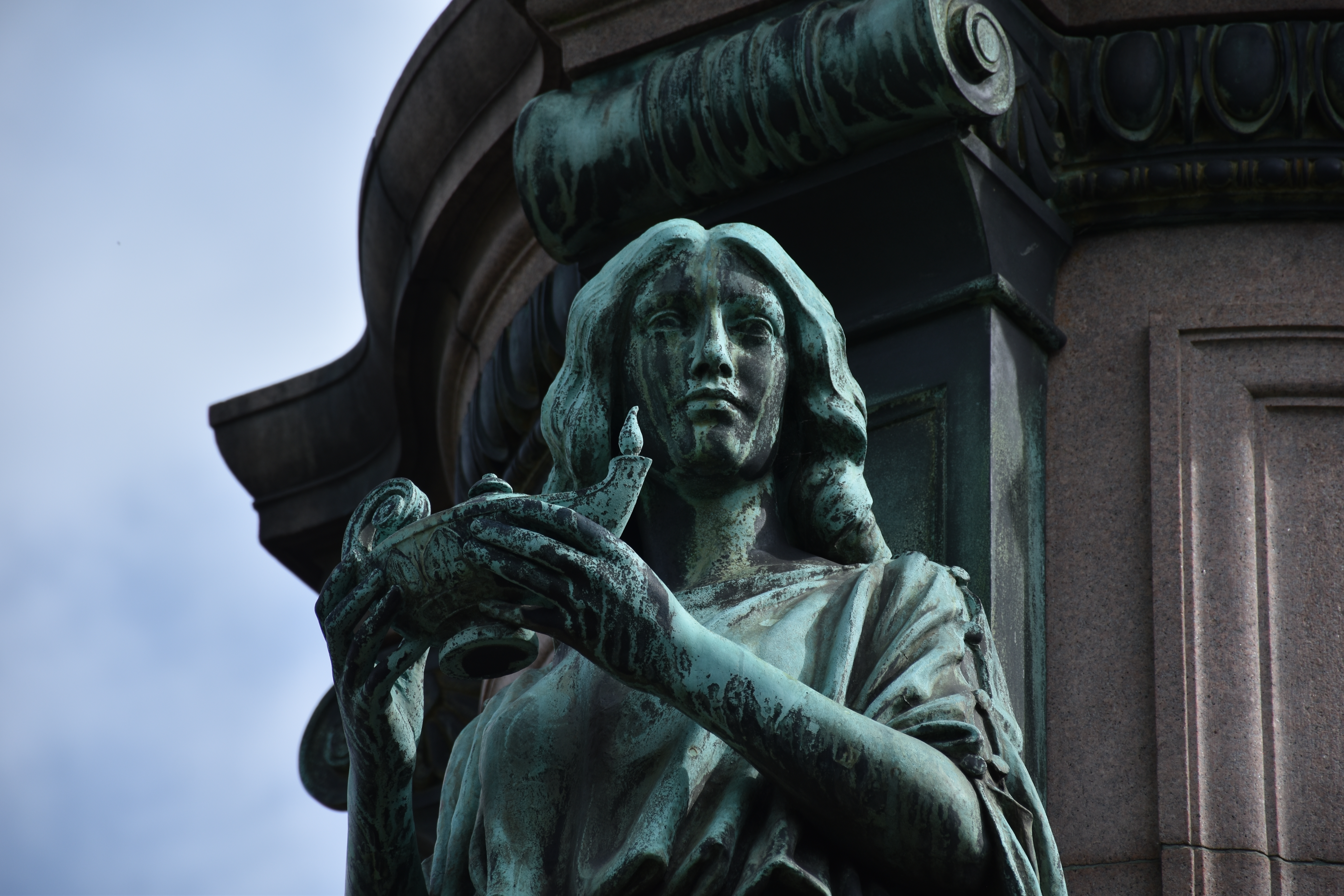
Detail of Vitality

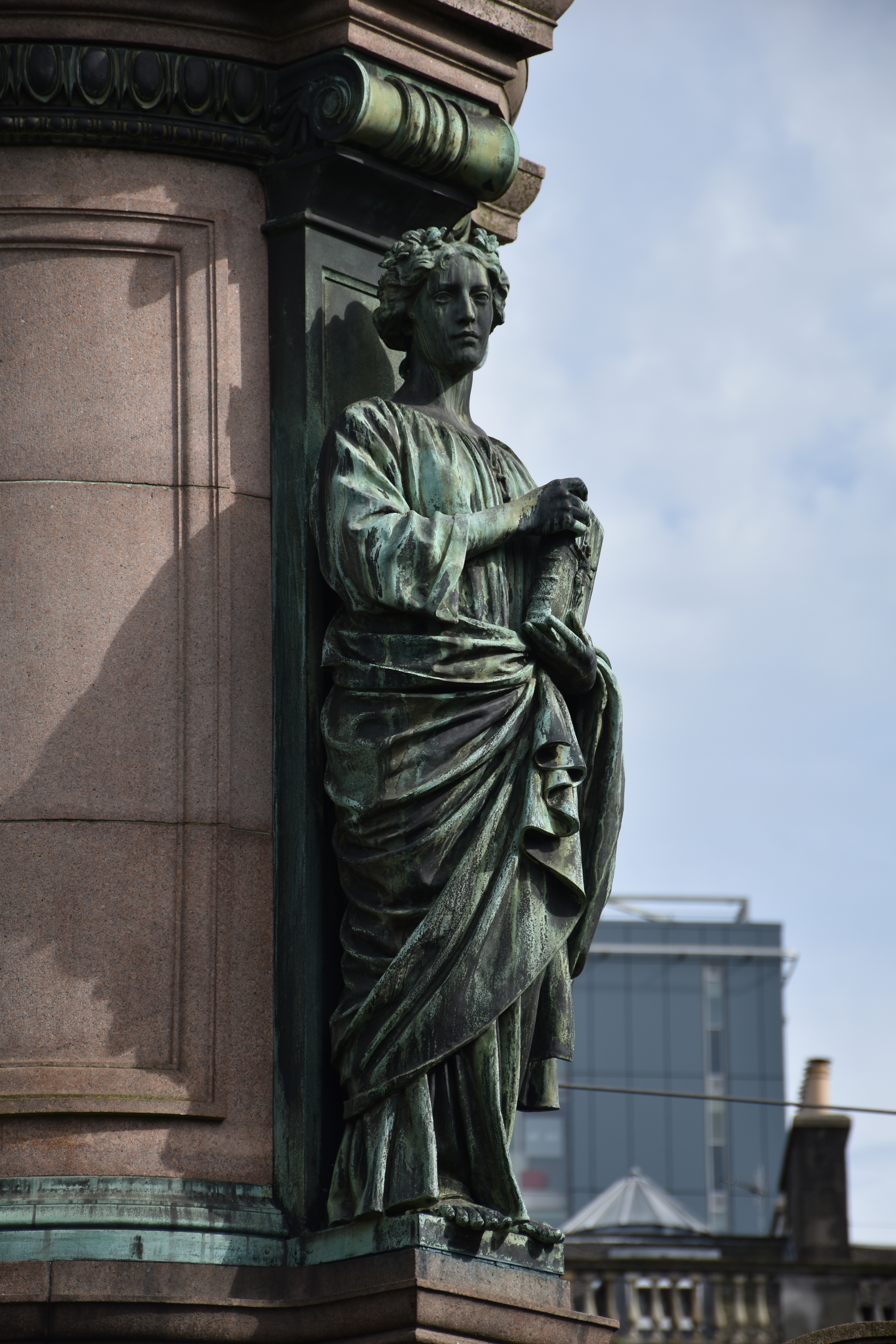
Faith, allegory of

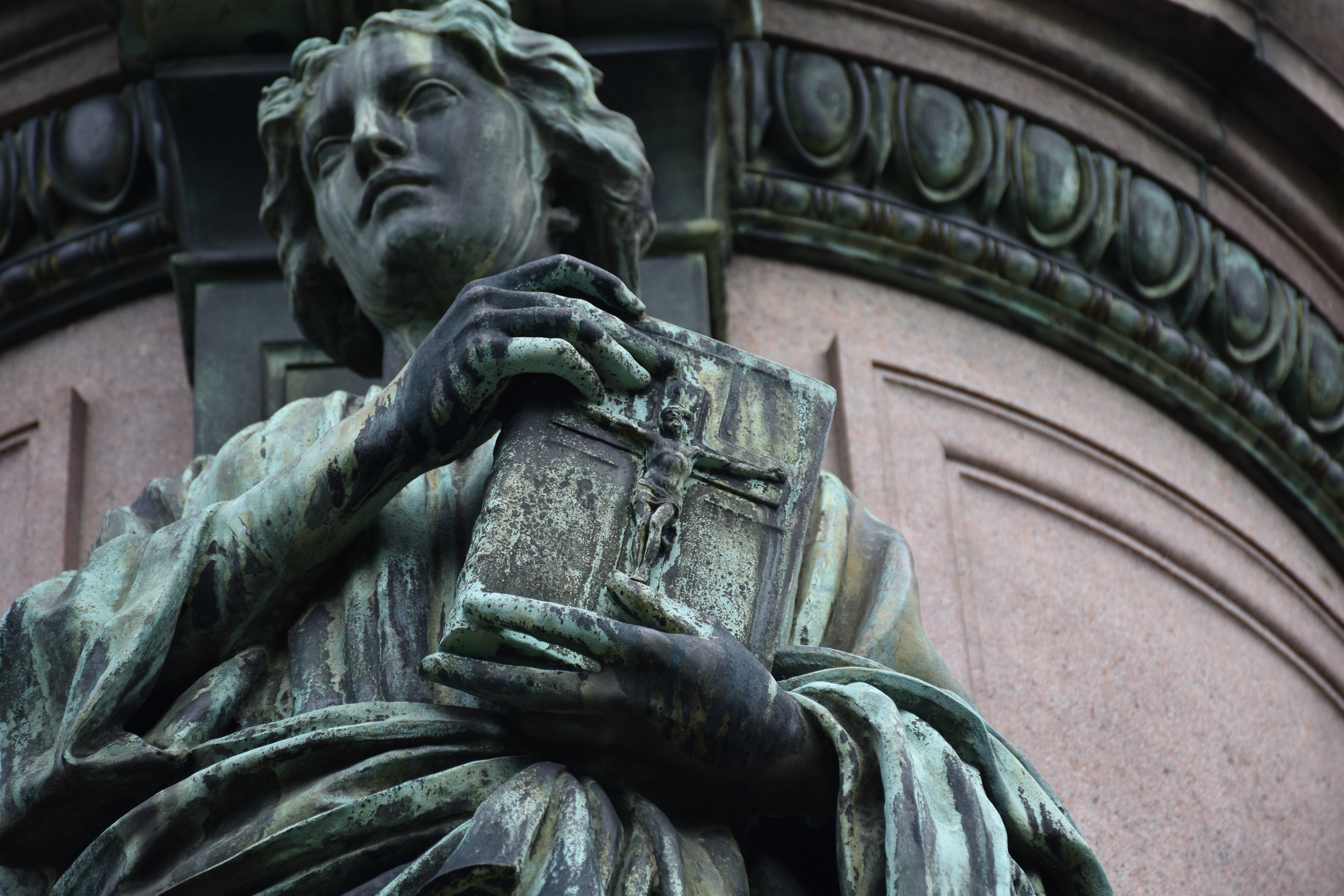
Detail of Faith

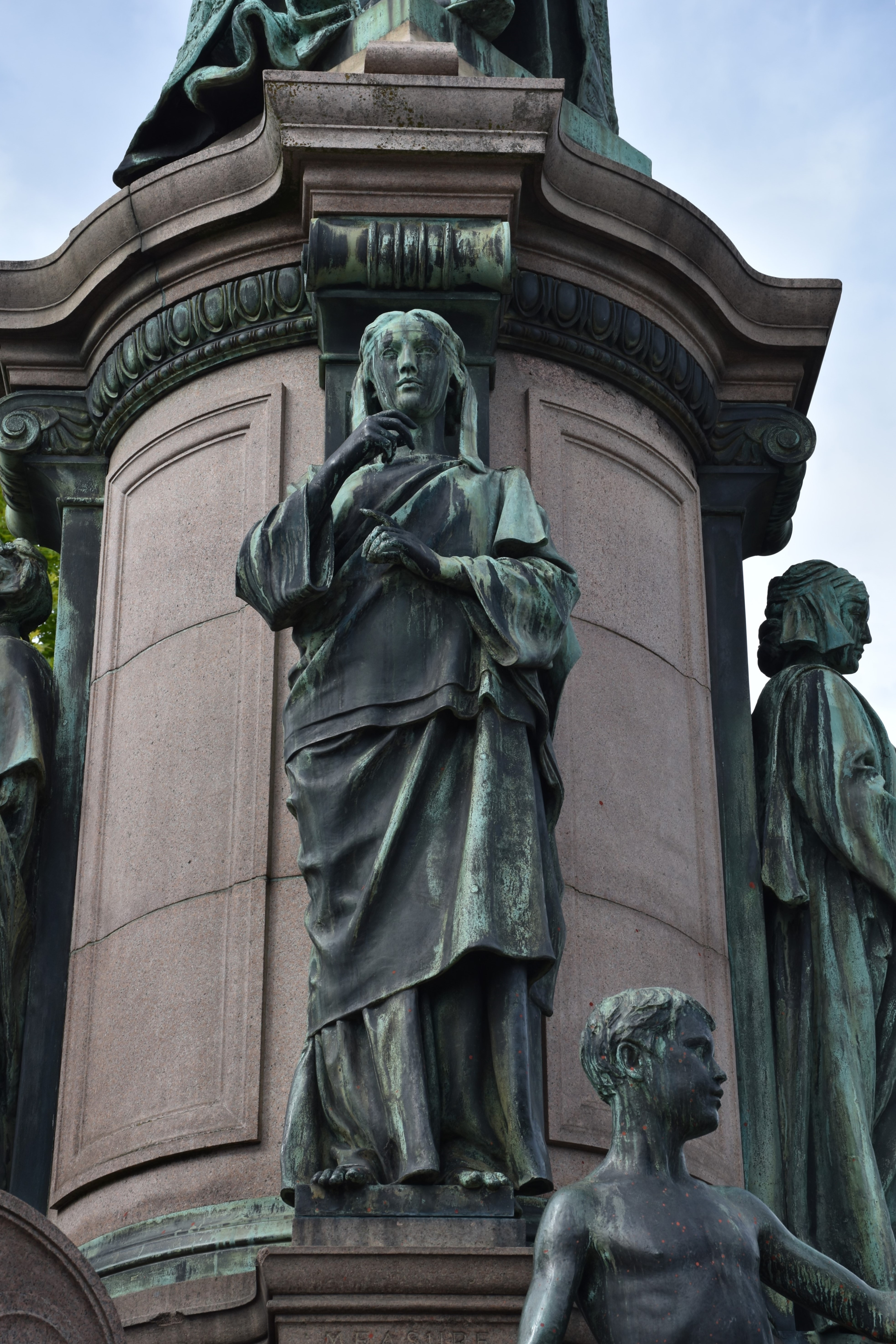
Measure, allegory of

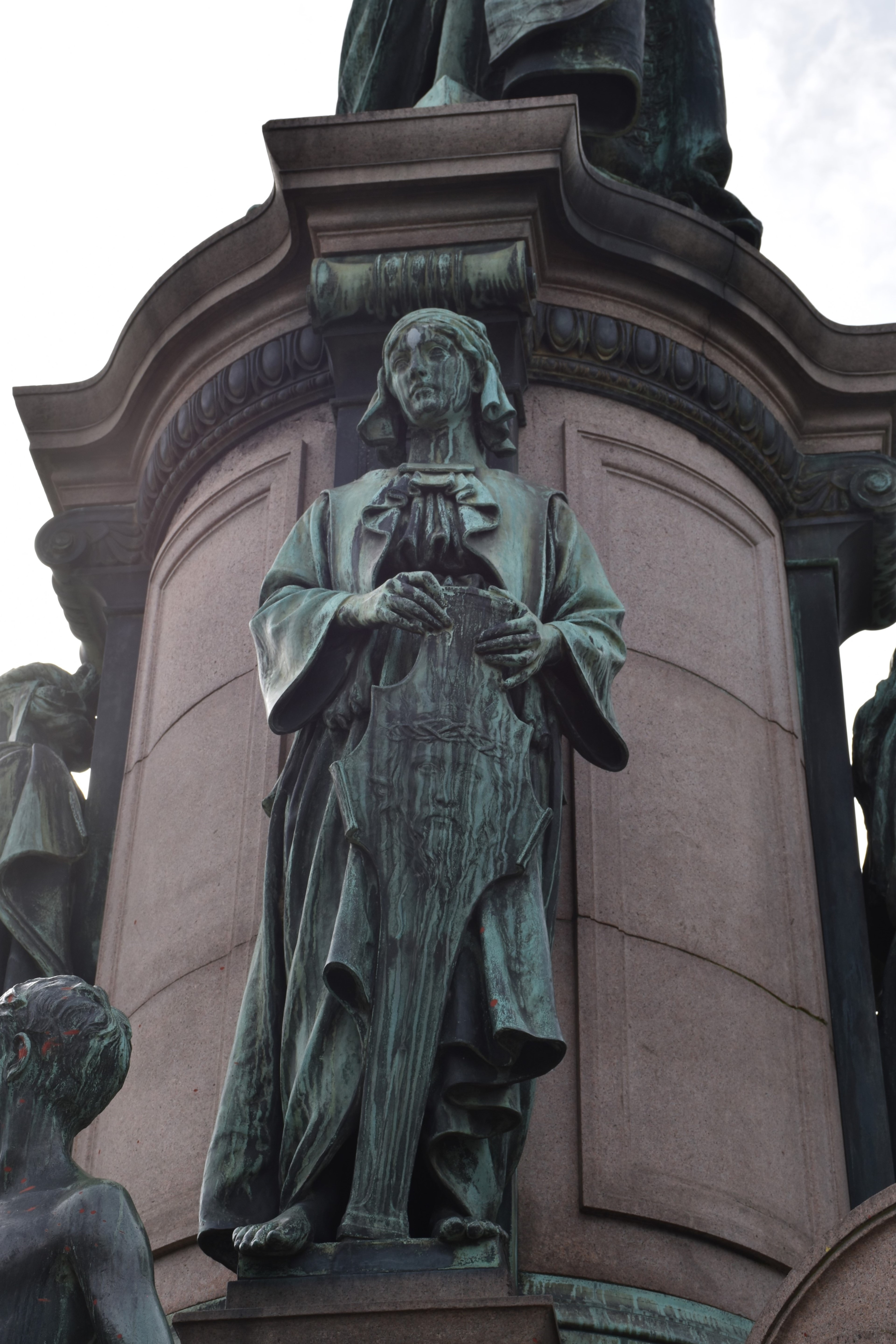
Fortitude, allegory of

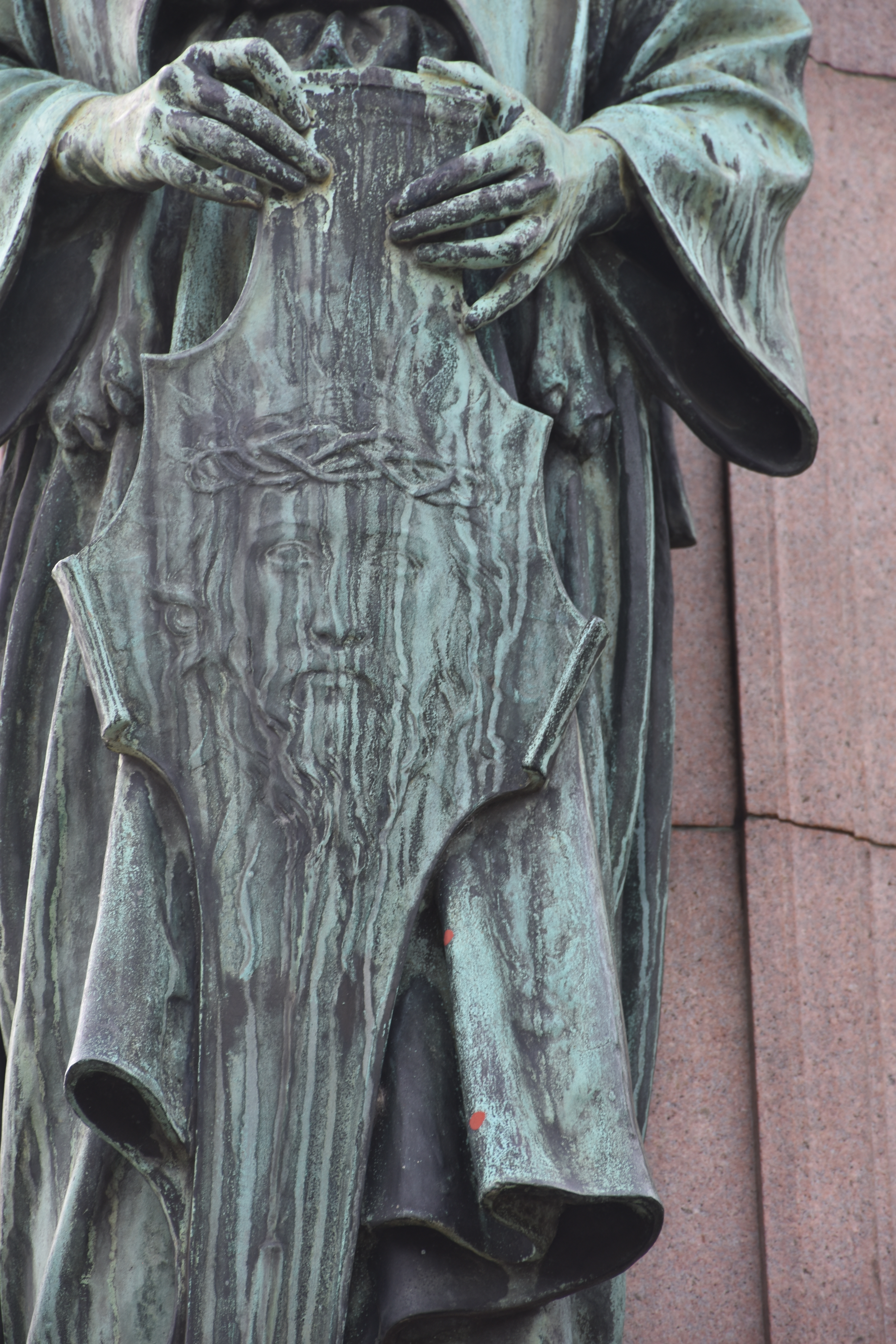
Fortitude, detail of shield

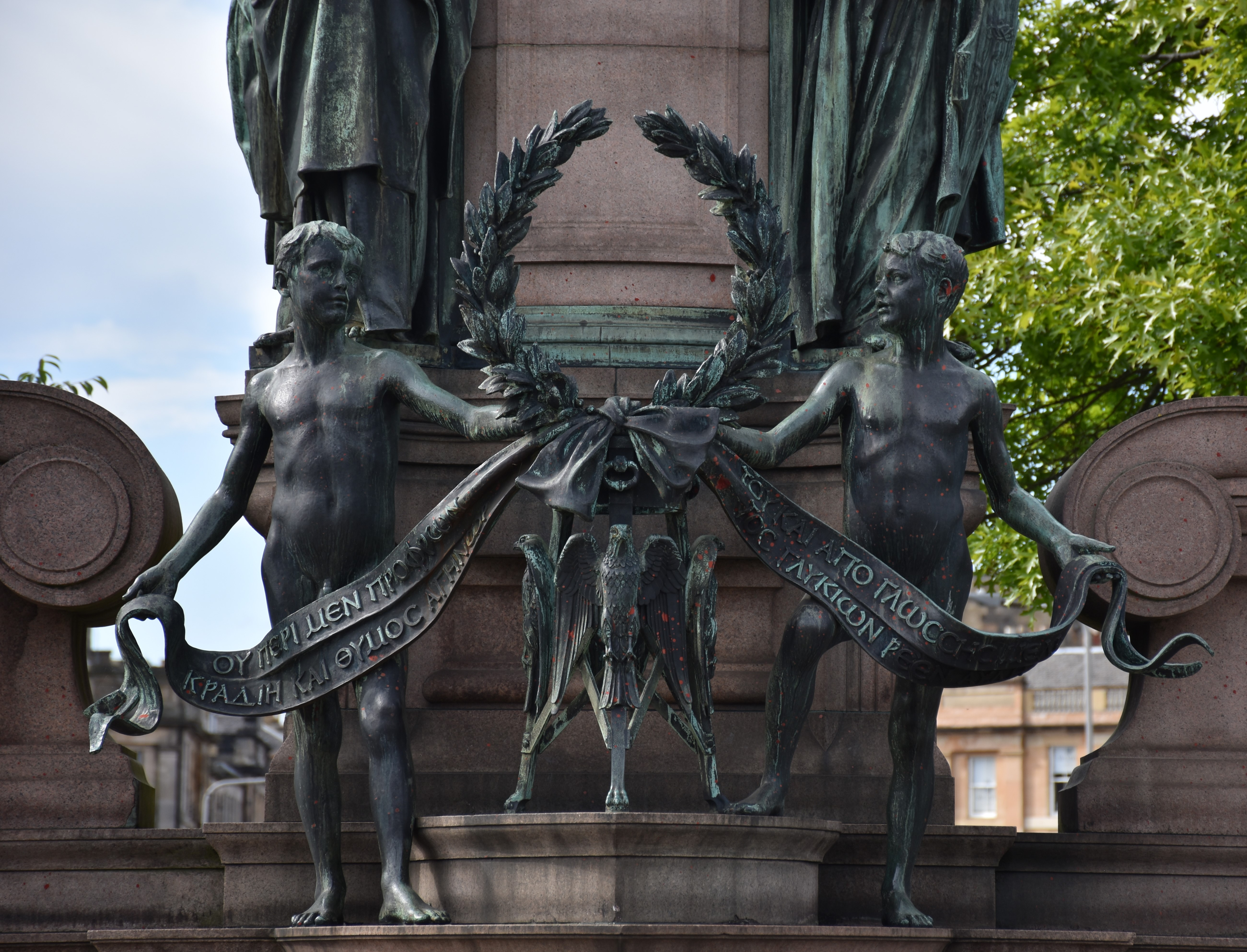
Two boys on rostrum holding a wreath and ribbons

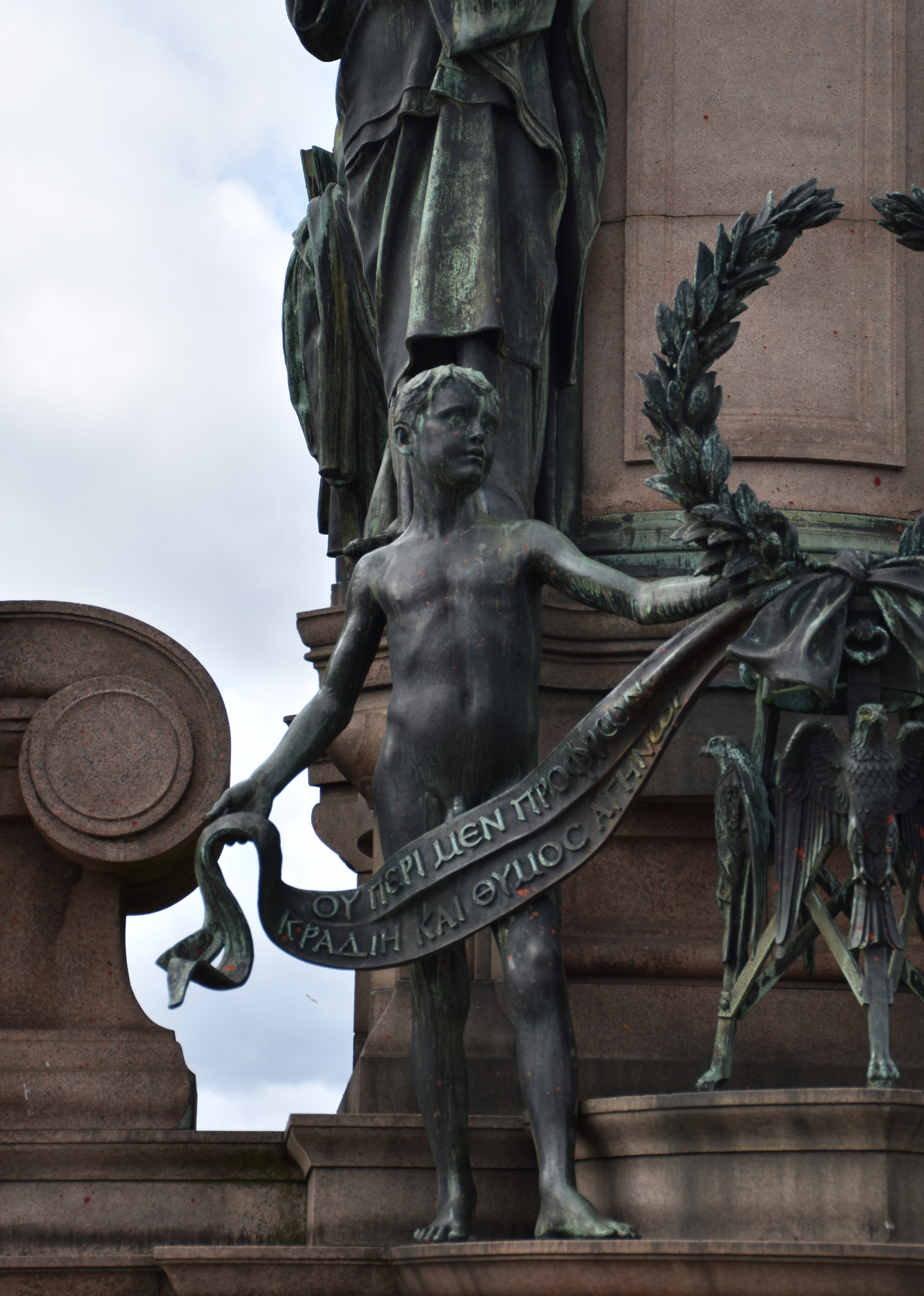
Boy, proper right, holding a wreath and ribbon

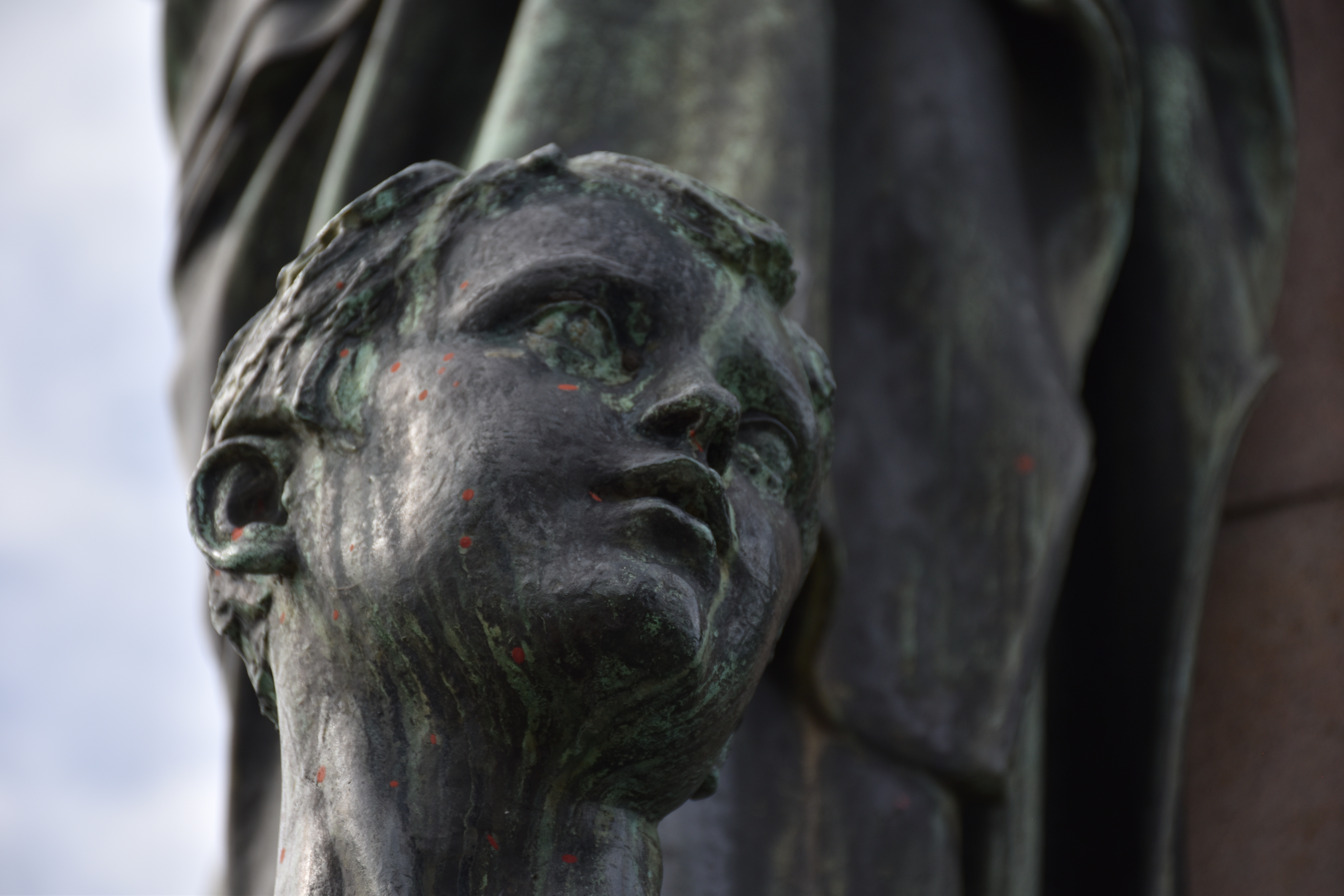
Boy, proper right, detail head

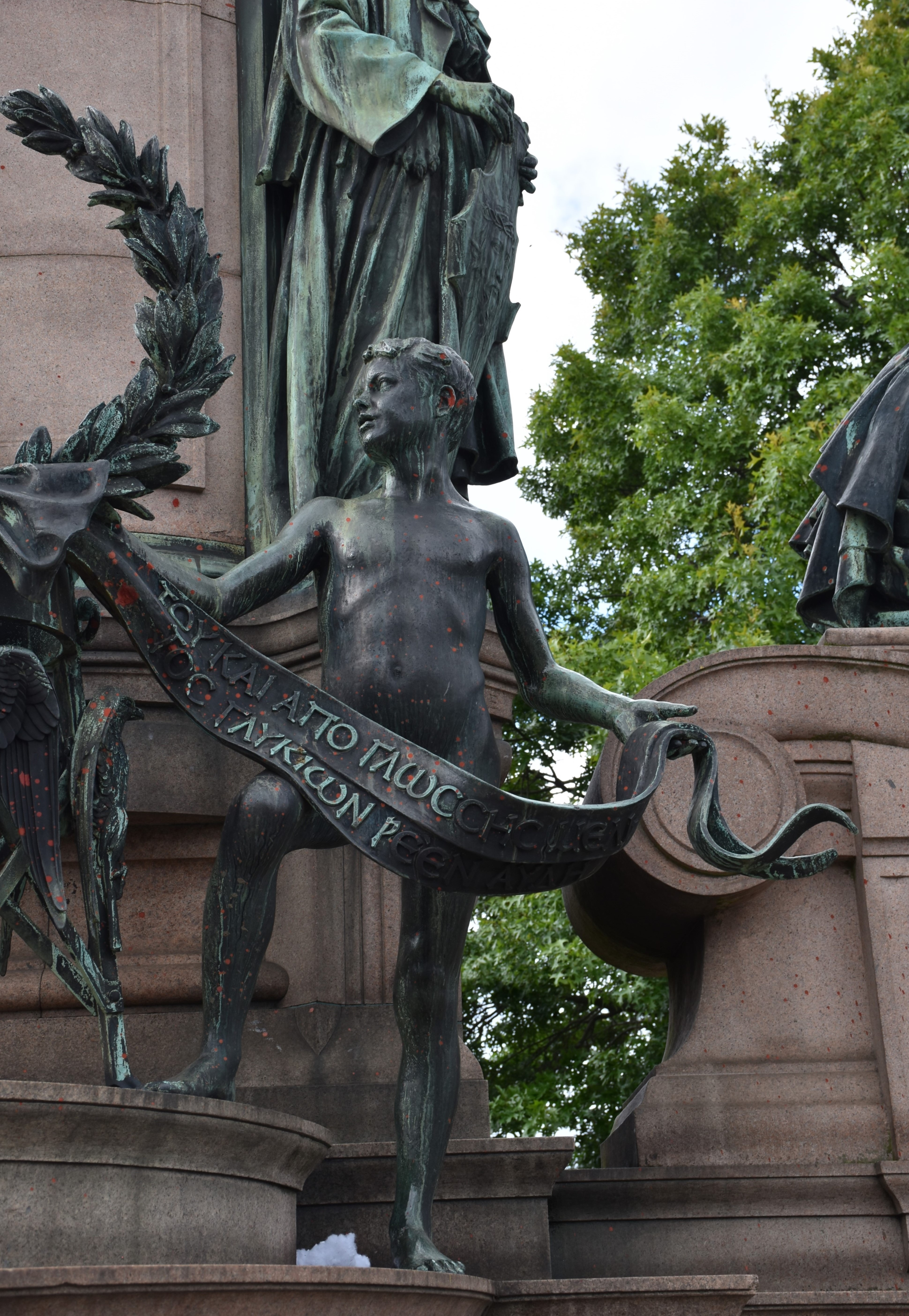
Boy, proper left, holding a wreath and ribbon

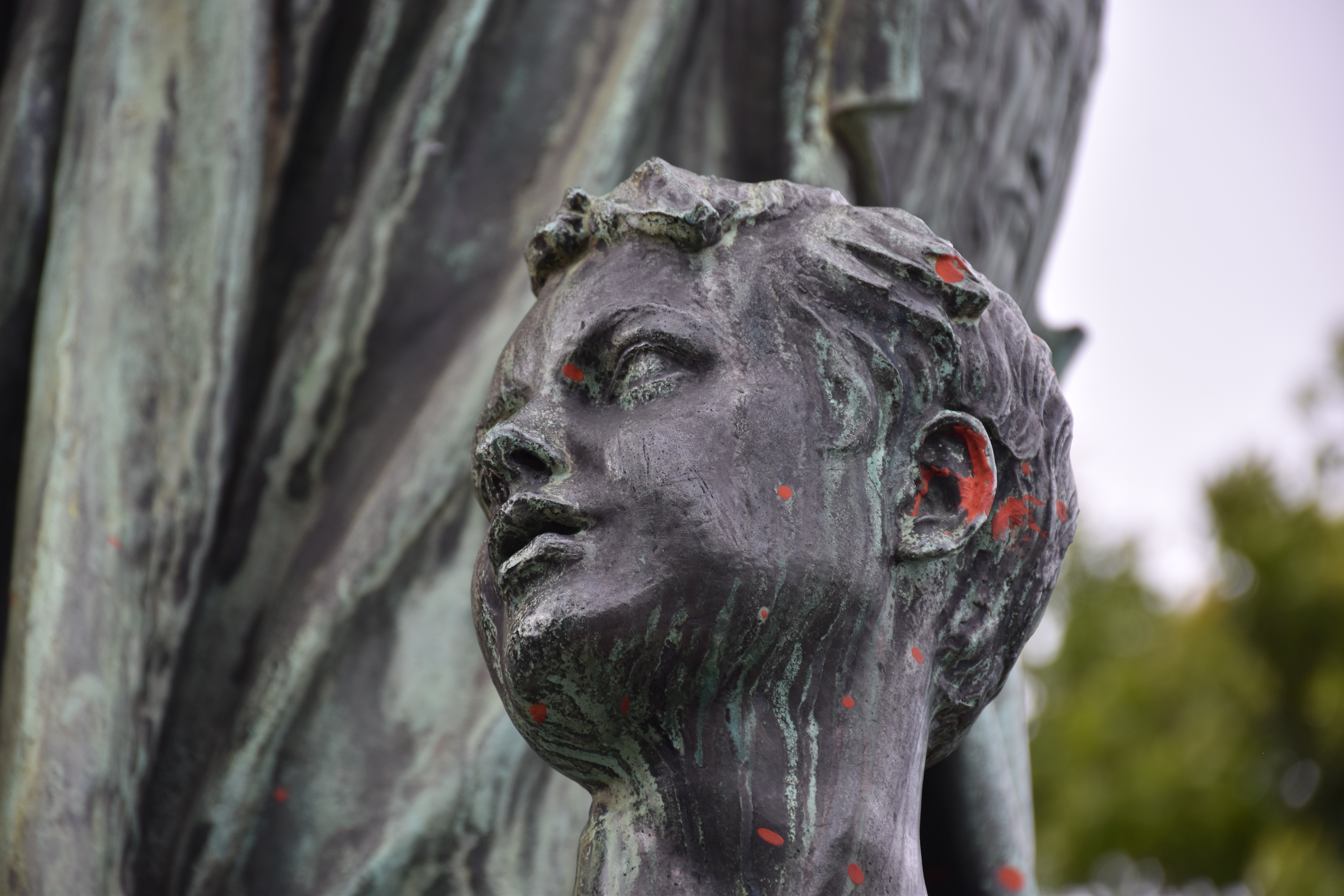
Boy, proper left, detail head

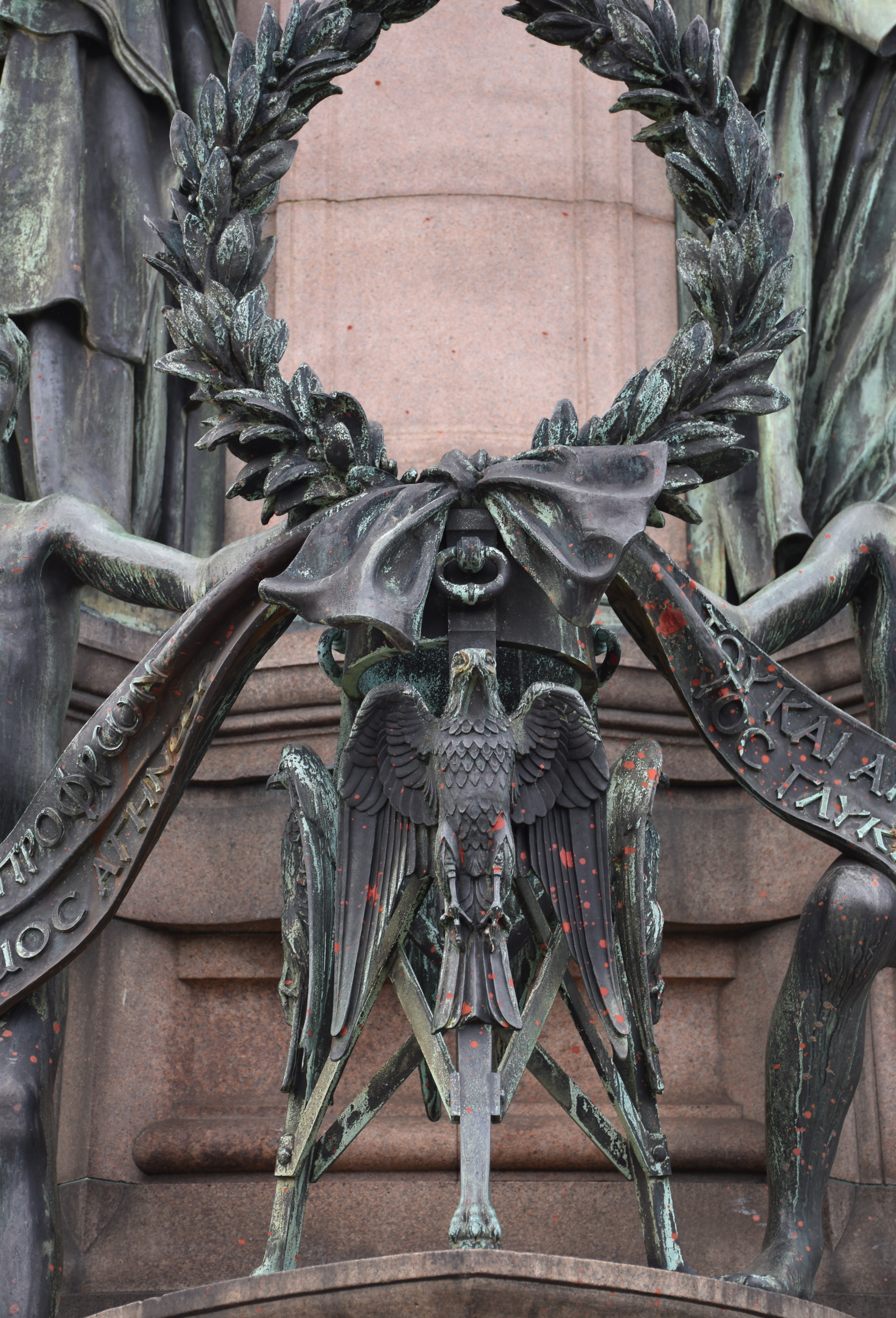
Tripod ornamented with three Kites

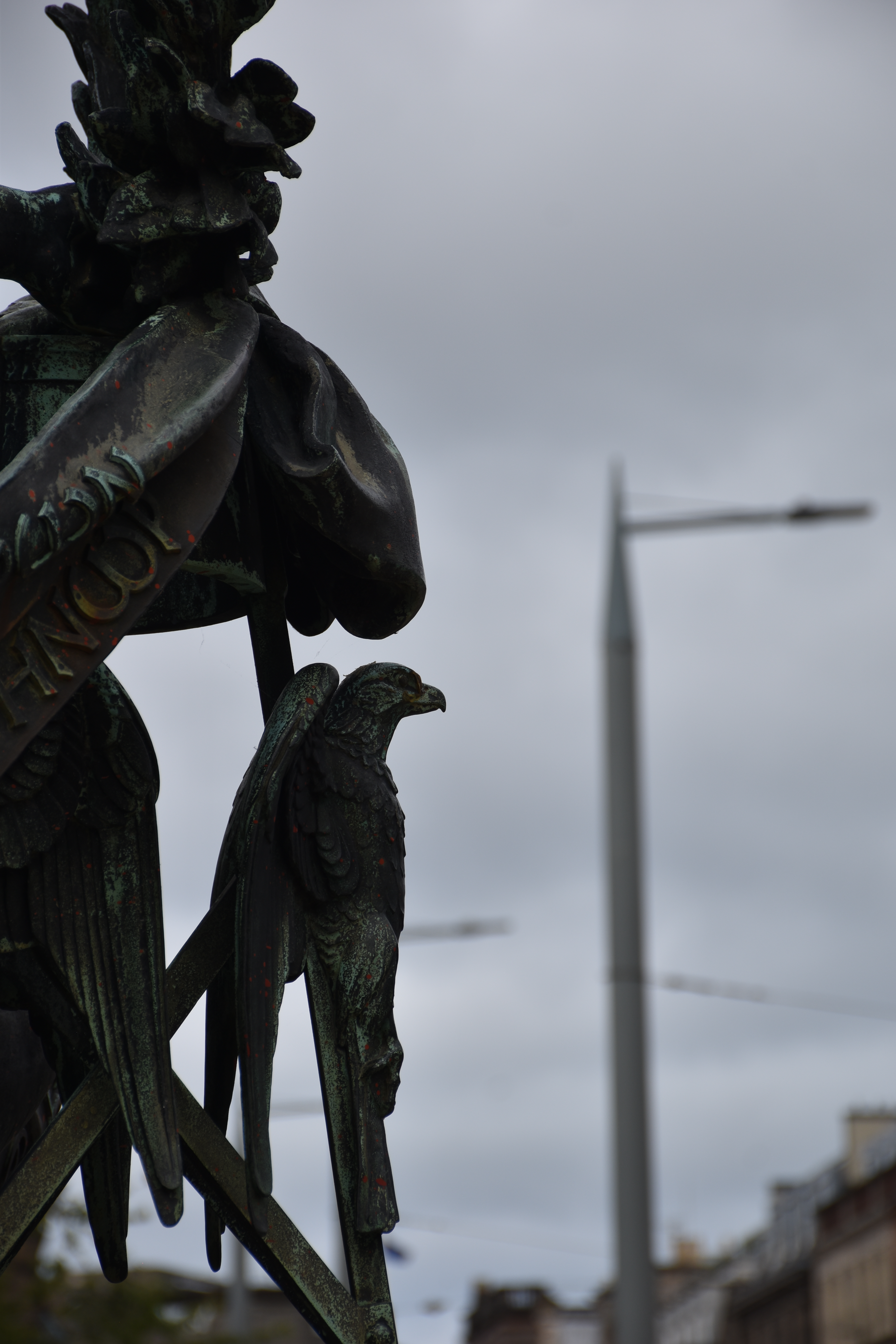
Detail of kite from tripod
- Statue of David Livingstone in Cathedral Square, Glasgow (1875) as assistant to main sculptor:John Mossman
- Statue of Thomas Campbell (poet) in George Square Glasgow (1875–77) still as assistant to John Mossman the main sculptor.
- Portrait bust of Joseph Crawhall, one of the "Glasgow Boys" (1881)
- Figures over the inner loggia (west) on Glasgow City Chambers (1886)
- Monument to Peter Stewart, engineer, in Glasgow Necropolis (1887)
- Monument to Alexander McCall in Glasgow Necropolis (1888)
- Monument to Margaret and Annie Brown in Cathcart Cemetery, Cathcart, Glasgow (1888)
- Bust of Rev James Shanks in Maryhill Parish Church (1889) (demolished 1998)
- Typanum relief group on Anderson's Medical College, 56 Dumbarton Road, Partick (1889–1890) (commissioned by James Sellars its architect. This depicts the 16th century physician Peter Lowe with his students. plus a pair of winged figures.
- Monument to Annie Greenhill in Glasgow Necropolis (1889)
- Portrait bust of Thomas Carlyle (1889)
- Monument to Sir James Robertson in Glasgow Necropolis (1889)
- Figures of the Engineer and Shipwright on Fairfield Shipbuilding and Engineering Company Office (1890)
- Monument to James Sellars architect and his friend, Lambhill Cemetery, Glasgow (1890) his bronze relief portrait was sadly stolen.
- Medallion of Peter Lowe in Glasgow Cathedral (1893)
- Portrait bust in white marble of Saul Solomon, Cape Colony MP and businessman, in the Parliament of South Africa, Cape Town (1893)
- Huge monument to Alexander Allan and his family, Glasgow Necropolis (1894–99) granite sections by Alexander McDonald of Aberdeen
- Statue of Robert Burns in Irvine (1895)
- Medallion of Edward Caird in Glasgow University (1897)
- Bust of Prof David Masson, Old College, University of Edinburgh (1897)
- Monument to James Hedderwick, Glasgow Cathedral (1901)
- Livingstone Medal of Royal Scottish Geographical Society (1901)
- Reclining marble effigy of James Francis Montgomery in St Mary's Episcopal Cathedral, Edinburgh (1902)
- Statue of Lord Byron in Aberdeen (1902)
- William Gladstone Memorial in Edinburgh (1902) assisted by William Shirreffs and (briefly) Louis Deuchars
- Statue of John Knox in St Giles Cathedral, Edinburgh (1902)
- Statue of the 3rd Marquess of Bute in Cardiff (1902)
- Portrait medallion of Henry Drummond (evangelist) on the Henry Drummond Memorial Fountain at Kelvingrove Park Gates (1902...now lost)
- Sculpted figures on Dumfries Public Library (1904)
- Medallion of Henry Drummond (evangelist) in the Free Church College, Edinburgh (1905)
- Portrait head in low relief of Margaret Oliphant (1828–189 7) St Giles Cathedral (1908)
- Grave for his wife Frieda in Gogar Churchyard (1910)
- Robert Rowand Anderson, Scottish National Portrait Gallery (1921)
