= Sadie McLellan =

Scottish stained glass artist

- Born: 25 October 1914; Milngavie, Scotland
- Died: 7 February 2007 (aged 92); Nova Scotia, Canada
- Education: Glasgow School of Art
- Spouse: Walter Pritchard
- Children: 1 (daughter)
- Parents: John McLellan (father); Elizabeth Hannah (mother)
- Relatives: Robert McLellan (brother)

Sadie F McLellan (25 October 1914 - 7 February 2007) was a Scottish stained glass artist known for her work in Robin Chapel and Glasgow Cathedral.

Christian battles Apollyon in one of the stained glass windows in Robin Chapel

== Biography ==
Born in Milngavie, Scotland on 25 October 1914, she was the youngest child of Elizabeth McLellan, née Hannah and John McLellan. McLellan was educated at Bearsden Academy before going on to graduate from the Glasgow School of Art with distinction. In her third year she studied in the workshop of Charles Baillie, an artist who worked with stained glass. She was awarded the John Keppie scholarship.

McLellan pioneered the use of a stained glass technique called "Dalle de verre" in Scotland. She used this technique in her work in Pluscarden Abbey.

From 1971 McLellan and her husband worked in the Crawfordjohn, South Lanarkshire and in 1989 McLellan retired to live with her daughter in Canada.

== Notable works ==
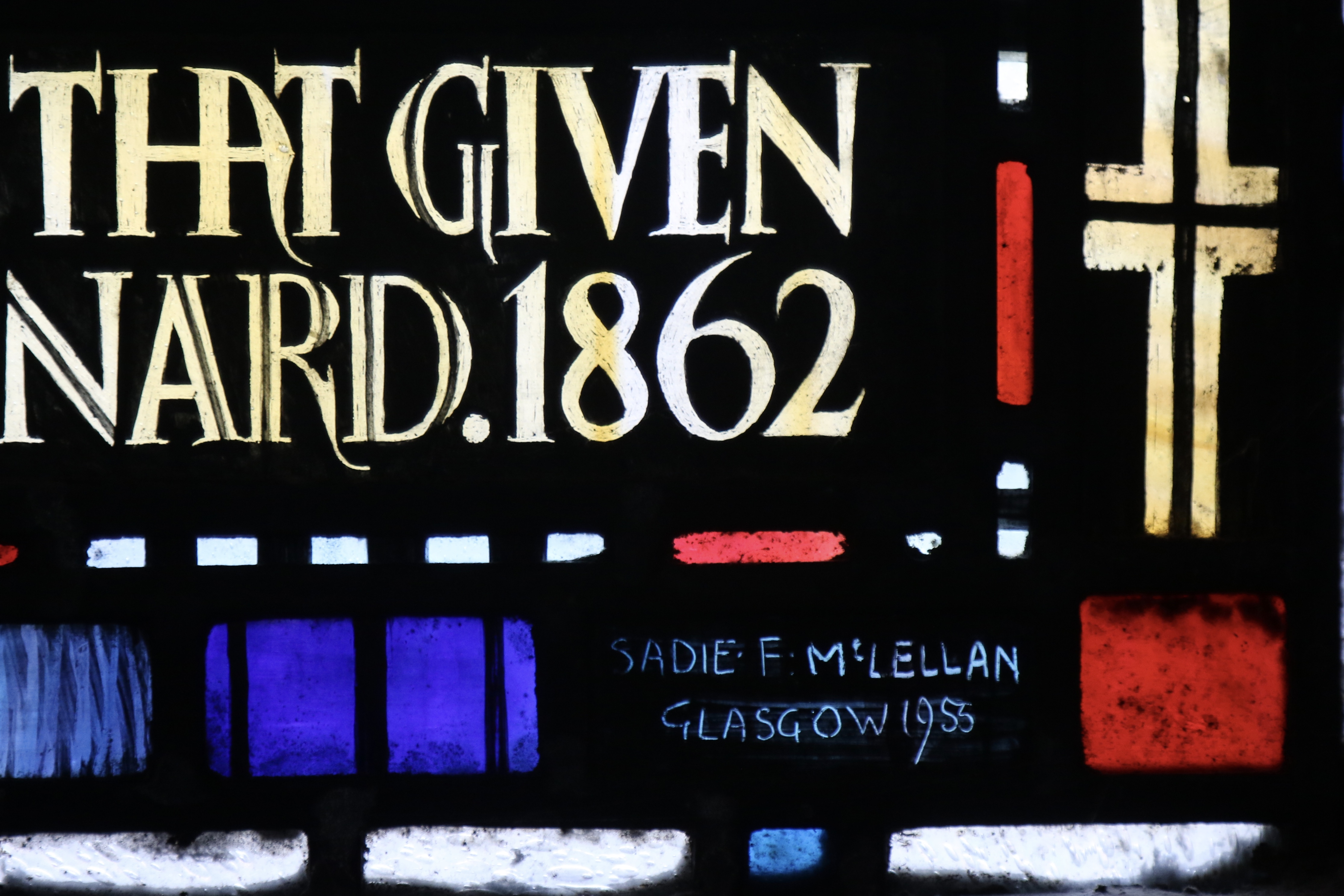
Sadie McLellan's maker's mark in Glasgow Cathedral

McLellan's work can be found in churches and buildings around Scotland including:

- Glasgow Cathedral
- Cambuslang Old Parish
- Netherlee, Alloa
- Te Deum Laudmus in Kelvinside Hillhead Parish Church, Glasgow
- Cardonald churches,
- Pluscarden Abbey,
- Ten windows depicting scenes from John Bunyan’s Pilgrim’s Progress in the Robin Chapel of the Thistle Foundation
- Cardross Parish Church: Windows on the theme Recurrent Creation comprise four pairs of lights, illustrating the flow of creation through the seasons of the year.
- Pluscarden Abbey Marian window celebrates the Virgin Mary, and depicts the cosmic battle between good and evil.

== Personal life ==
In 1940, McLellan married Walter Pritchard, a fellow stained-glass artist and muralist. They had one daughter. Her brother is Robert McLellan, Scottish dramatist.

In his book A Lap of Honour (1967), the author Hugh MacDiarmid dedicated the poem The Terrible Crystal "To Sadie MacLellan (Mrs Walter Pritchard)". In this poem MacDiarmid praises "Clear thought" and "the open and unbiased mind".
