= Greek Orthodox Cathedral of St Luke, Glasgow =

St Luke's Cathedral
- The Cathedral Church of Saint Luke
- Ο καθεδρικός ναός του Αγίου Λουκά
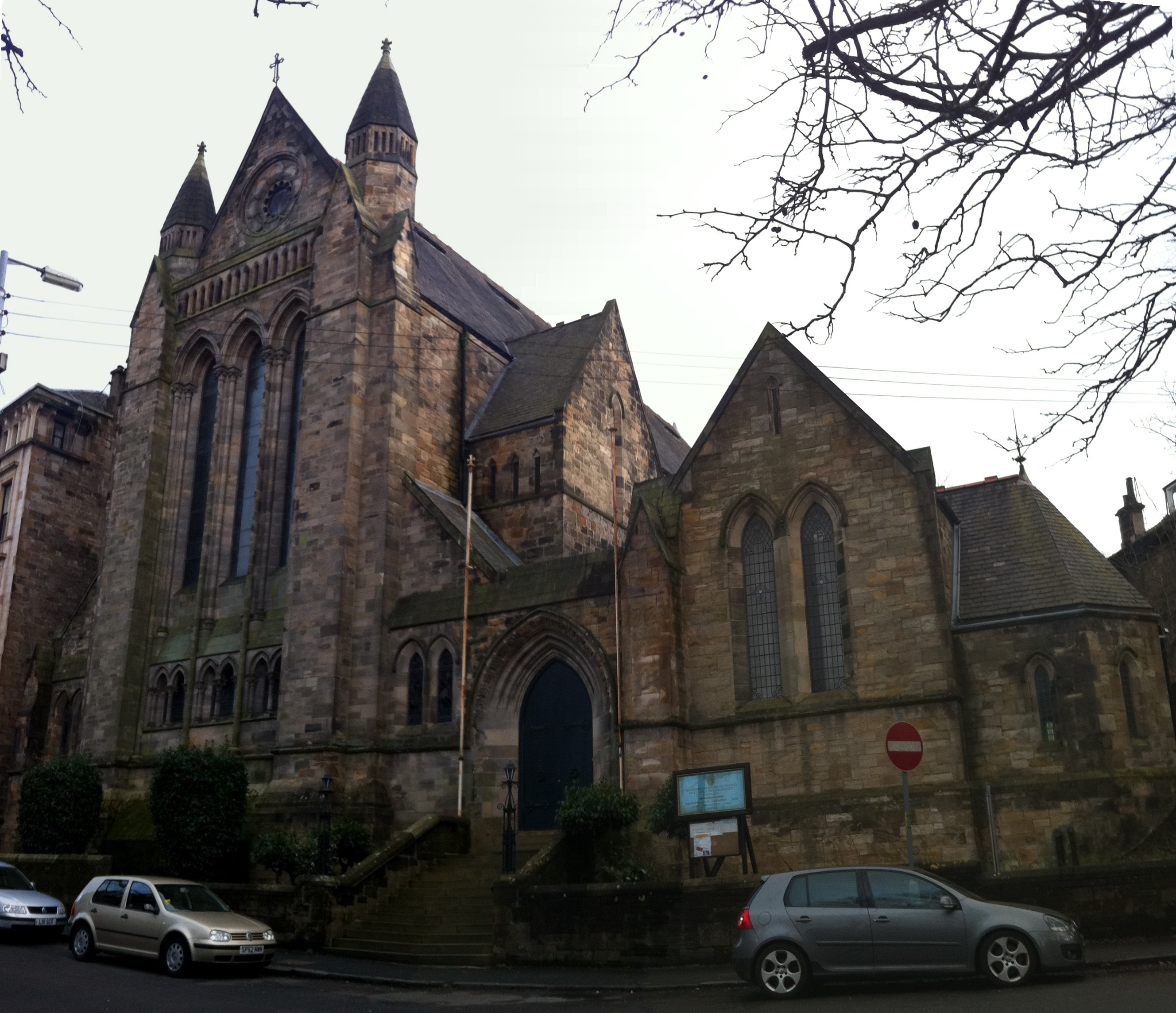
- St Luke's Cathedral
- 55°52′44″N 4°17′56″W
- Location: Glasgow
- Country: Scotland
- Denomination: Greek Orthodox Church
- Previous denomination: United Presbyterian Church
- Website: Cathedral Website

History
- Former name: Belhaven United Presbyterian Church
- Status: Active
- Dedication: Luke the Evangelist

Architecture
- Functional status: Cathedral & Parish church
- Architect: James Sellars
- Architectural type: Church
- Style: Gothic Revival
- Years built: 1876–1877

Administration
- Archdiocese: Thyateira and Great Britain

Clergy
- Archbishop: Nikitas Loulias

Listed Building – Category B
- Designated: 15 December 1970
- Reference no.: LB32508

St. Luke's Greek Orthodox Cathedral is a cathedral of the Greek Orthodox Church in the Dowanhill district of Glasgow, Scotland.

== History ==
=== Belhaven U.P. Church ===
The church was designed by James Sellars and built in 1877 as the Belhaven Church for the United Presbyterian Church of Scotland. The church was built in Norman Gothic style, inspired by Dunblane Cathedral. The congregation became part of the Church of Scotland in 1929 and continued to meet there until 1960.

A prominent feature of the church is the collection of stained glass windows designed by Stephen Adam which depict scenes from the Old and New Testament.

=== Orthodoxy ===
Following the amalgamation of Belhaven Church with a neighbouring congregation, the Belhaven Church building was no longer needed by the Church of Scotland. It was converted to a Greek Orthodox Church; the work was paid for by Sir Reo Stakis. Stakis had also paid for the first (much smaller) Greek Orthodox church in the city, in 1953.

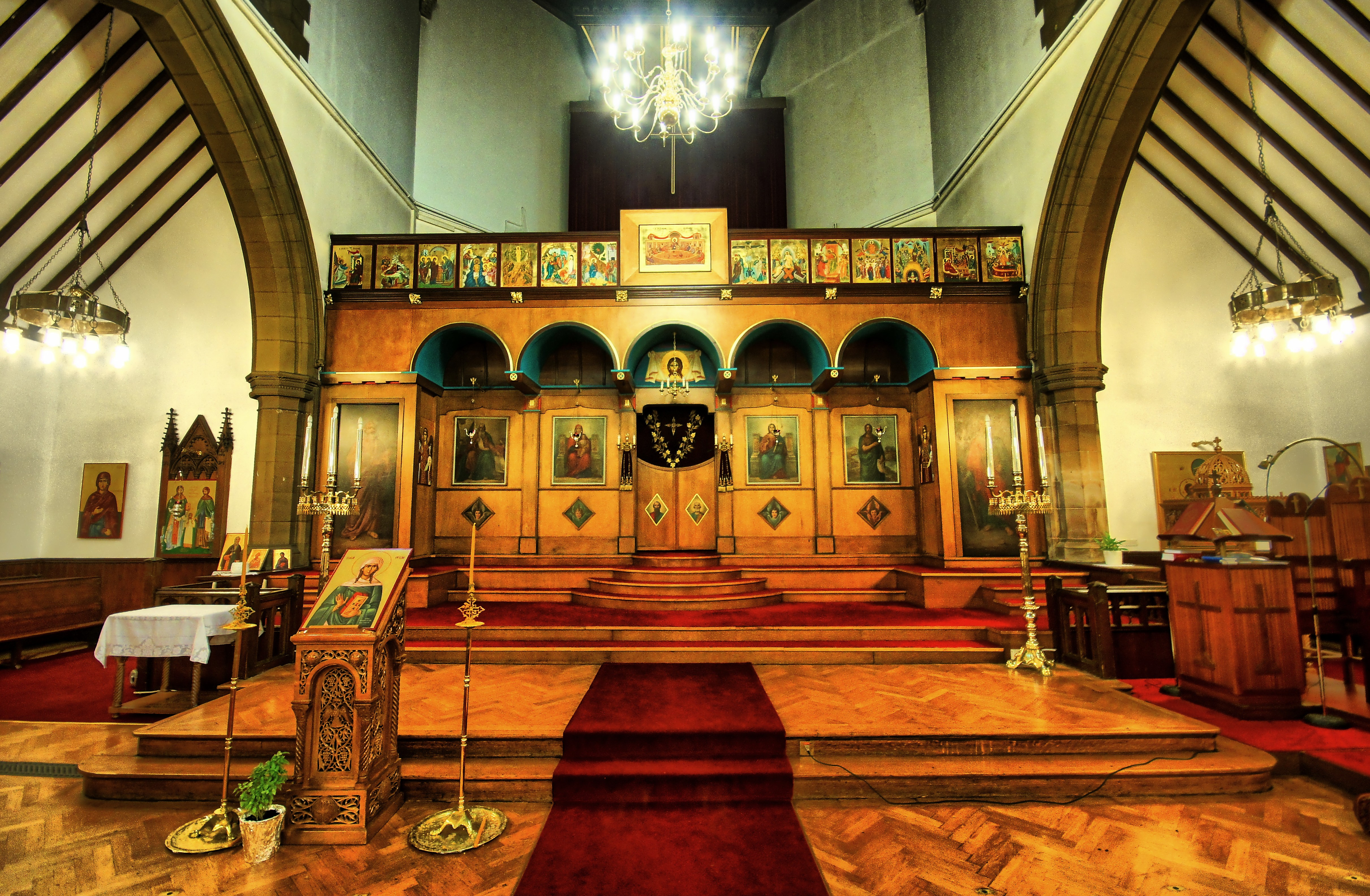
St Luke's Templon

On 24 May 1970 the Patriarch Nicholas VI of Alexandria, who was attending the General Assembly of the Church of Scotland, visited St. Luke's and elevated it to the status of a Cathedral, with the blessing of the Ecumenical Patriarchate of Constantinople. This occasion is commemorated with a marble plaque, inscribed with gold lettering, at the right side of the entrance hall.

On Sunday 7 July 1996 the cathedral was visited by the Ecumenical Patriarch Bartholomew I of Constantinople, who celebrated the Divine Liturgy.

== Other cathedrals ==
The other cathedrals in Glasgow are St. Andrew's Cathedral (Roman Catholic) and St. Mary's Cathedral (Episcopalian). Glasgow Cathedral (Church of Scotland) is also in Glasgow, but it is not a Cathedral Church, as it is no longer the seat of a bishop.

Nearby churches include:

- Jordanhill Parish Church (Church of Scotland)
- Kelvinside Hillhead Parish Church (Church of Scotland)
- St. John's Renfield Church (Church of Scotland)
- St. Mary's Cathedral (Scottish Episcopal Church)
- Wellington Church (Church of Scotland)
