= New Scottish Group =

Collection of artists based in Glasgow

Self portrait of leading figure in the Group John Duncan Fergusson in 1902

The New Scottish Group was a loose collection of artists based in Glasgow, who exhibited from 1942 to 1956. It was formed around John Duncan Fergusson after his return to Glasgow in 1939. It had its origins in the New Art Club formed in 1940, and had its first exhibition in 1942. Members did not have a common style, but shared left-wing views and were influenced by contemporary continental art. Members included Donald Bain, William Crosbie, Marie de Banzie and Isabel Babianska. Tom MacDonald, Bet Low and William Senior formed the Clyde Group to pursue political painting that manifested in urban industrial landscapes. The group helped start the careers of a generation of Glasgow-based artists and was part of a wider cultural "golden age" for the city.

== History ==
John Duncan Fergusson (1874–1961), who was the longest surviving of the group of artists known as the Scottish Colourists, had settled in France, but returned to Scotland in 1939, just before the outbreak of the Second World War, with his partner, the dancer and choreographer Margaret Morris (1891–1980). There he became a leading figure of a group of younger Glasgow artists. Members of Fergusson's group formed the New Art Club in 1940, in opposition to the established Glasgow Art Club. In 1942 they held the first of what would be a series of shows of their own exhibiting society, the New Scottish Group, with Fergusson as its first president. The introduction to the catalogue of their first show was written by novelist and poet Naomi Mitchison (1897–1999). The group held annual exhibitions in the period 1943–48, and larger shows in 1951 and 1956.

Important to the artists was the nationalist and left-wing publisher William MacLellan, who produced a number of works of Glasgow artists in the 1940s, including Fergusson's book Modern Scottish Painting (1943), which expressed his anti-academic and democratic ideals and his desire to form a British equivalent to the French Salon des Indépendants. Members of the group were involved in two of MacLellan's magazines in this period, supplying visual material or Poetry Scotland (1943–49) and Scottish Art and Letters (1944–50), which played an important part in disseminating ideas of the Scottish Renaissance. Fergusson designed the covers for Scottish Art and Letters and acted as its artistic director. Fergusson also illustrated MacLellan's edition of by Hugh MacDiarmid's In Memoriam James Joyce (1955) and his paintings from this period included Danu mother of the Gods, both of which combined elements of Celtic culture and modernism. In their last exhibition in 1956 the group displayed with another organisation, the Society of Scottish Independent Artists, a title that recalled Fergusson's ambition. Fergusson died in 1961.

== Members ==
The group had no single style, but shared left-wing tendencies and included artists strongly influenced by trends in contemporary continental art. Painters involved included Donald Bain (1904–79), whose work was often crowded with rich colour and heavily worked paint, as in his The Striped Vase (1943), which was influenced by expressionism. William Crosbie (1915–99) was strongly influenced by surrealism, which can be seen in his Heart Knife (1934), an early example of a Scottish artist using the semi-abstract style derived from cubism. Margaret Oliver Brown (1912–90) was known for her portraiture. Marie de Banzie (1918–90) was influenced by expressionism and particularity the post-expressionist work of Gauguin, as can be seen in her 1945 painting Shadow, which borrows from his Haitian pictures. Isabel Brodie Babianska (1920–2006), who had trained with de Banzie at the Glasgow School of Art, was influenced by expressionist Chaïm Soutine, as can be seen in the collection of grotesque faces in her painting Fiesta (1943). Expressionism can also be seen as an influence on the work of Millie Frood (1900–88), in dislocated landscapes such as October (1946) and Turning Hay, which included vivid colours and brushwork reminiscent of Van Gogh. Frood's urban scenes contain an element of social commentary and realism, influenced by Polish refugees Josef Herman (1911–2000), resident in Glasgow between 1940 and 1943 and Jankel Adler (1895–1949), who was based in Kirkcudbright from 1941 to 1943. Also influenced by Herman were husband and wife Tom MacDonald (1914–85) and Bet Low (1924–2007), who with painter William Senior (b. 1927) formed the Clyde Group, aimed at promoting political art. Their work included industrial and urban landscapes such as MacDonald's Transport Depot (1944–45) and Bet Low's Blochairn Steelworks (c. 1946).

== Significance ==
The New Scottish Group helped launch the careers of a number of young artists. It was also part of a cultural "golden age" for Glasgow, that included dance, theatre, literature and architecture. This included Margaret Morris' foundation of a professional dance troop, Celtic Ballet, in 1947, which combined traditional Scottish and classical dance.
