= Bet Low =

Scottish painter (1924–2007)

- Born: Bet Low; 2 December 1924; Gourock, Scotland
- Died: 15 December 2007 (aged 83)
- Education: Glasgow School of Art
- Notable work: Merge and Emerge
- Movement: Clyde Group
- Spouse: Tom MacDonald

Bet Low (28 December 1924 – 2 December 2007) was a Scottish figurative and landscape painter, notable as one of the Glasgow Girls, and as a co-founder of the Clyde Group.

== Life ==
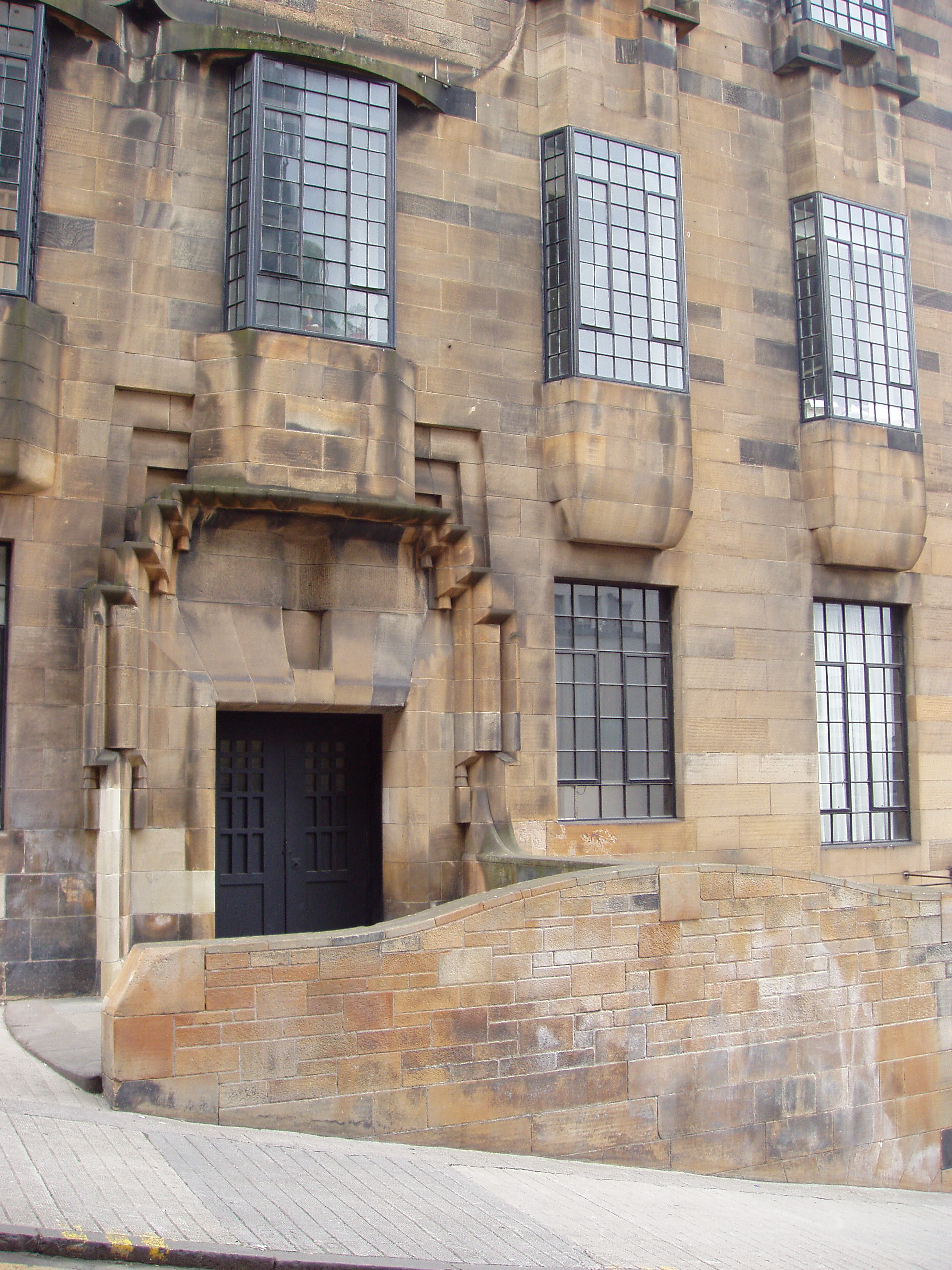
Glasgow School of Art, where Low studied.

Born in Gourock, Bet Low grew up by the Clyde Estuary in poor circumstances, influenced by the stark contrast between Glasgow's industrial areas and the surrounding Scottish countryside.

Low married, and later divorced, the painter Tom MacDonald. With her family, she regularly visited Hoy in Orkney, where the light and landscape provided fresh inspiration for her work.

== Work ==
Low studied at the Glasgow School of Art during the Second World War, and continued her studies at Hospitalfield House under James Cowie in 1945, who stimulated her lifelong interest in literature, philosophy and politics. She studied to become a teacher at Jordanhill College from 1945 to 1946 but did not complete her training after becoming interested in the theatre.

Following the war, Low was a co-founder of the Clyde Group, part of the left-wing New Scottish Group of writers and artists. Low's early figurative work was influenced by German Expressionism, and frequently depicted post-war Glasgow settings, characters, and refugees.

Low also worked in illustration and theatrical set design at the Glasgow Unity Theatre, and created her first set design for Ena Lamont Stewart's Men Should Weep.

By the 1960s, Low had moved on to the more abstract work for which she is now best known. Of Merge and Emerge (1961) Low said,

"I was trying to produce an effect of water moving over stones in a riverbed. In some parts, everything is hidden by the depth or movement of water and merged together, and in other parts where the water is more shallow, the stones appear beneath the surface again and emerge into sight"

A friend and contemporary of the poet George Mackay Brown, Low collaborated with him on the poster poem, "Orkney, the Whale Islands" (1987).

== Exhibitions and awards ==
Low exhibited with The Society of Scottish Independent Artists, the Royal Glasgow Institute, and the New Art Club founded by J.D. Fergusson and Margaret Morris.

In 1956 Low co-organised Glasgow's first open air exhibition, on the railings of the Botanical Gardens. It was reported in The Scotsman as "The Left Bank come to the Kelvin". The exhibition was run independently for five years.

A retrospective of Low's work was presented in 1986 at the Third Eye Centre in Glasgow and at the Pier Arts Centre in Stromness.

== See also ==
- Art in modern Scotland
- Landscape painting in Scotland
