= The Blue Cockatoo =

Restaurant information
- Location: Cheyne Walk, Chelsea, London, England

The Blue Cockatoo was a restaurant in Cheyne Walk, Chelsea, London, at the corner with Oakley Street. It is considered to have been England's first bistro.

The restaurant and its upper room was popular with artists, including Charles Rennie Mackintosh and his wife, Margaret Macdonald Mackintosh, who had studios in nearby Glebe Place from 1915. Other regulars included Augustus John, Randolph Schwabe, John Duncan Fergusson, and Margaret Morris. The food itself "was often unappetizing and the service erratic". Others included Eric Gill in 1927.

The restaurant was recommended in Raymond Postgate's first volume (1950/51) of The Good Food Guide which says, "Just the thing for visitors with a hankering after art and bohemia. The food is good even if inclined to be monotonous, and the Blue Cockatoo is a sixteenth-century house lit by candles; the furniture is old and rickety, and there is a lovely view of the river through the trees of Carlyle Gardens. Very cheap but not licensed. Lunch 3/--, dinner 3/6 and 5/--."

In 1962–1967, The Blue Cockatoo along with the Pier Hotel was sold to developers Wates Group to be replaced by "luxury flats". The block of flats is called Pier House, and a statue of A Boy on a Dolphin stands at the front.
