= Isabel Brodie Babianska =

Scottish painter (1920–2006)

- Born: Isabel Brodie; 5 February 1920; Glasgow, Scotland
- Died: 2006 (aged 85–86)
- Known for: painting, costume designer, stage designer
- Spouse: Count Tomasz Babianski

Isabel Brodie Babianska (5 February 1920 – 2006) was a Scottish painter and a founder member of the New Scottish Group. She worked on various commissions as a costume and stage designer, and as an illustrator and model.

== Childhood ==
Isabel Dalziel Brodie was born in Glasgow where her father was a decorative metal worker in the city's shipyards and who encouraged her artistic abilities from a young age.

== Glasgow School of Art ==
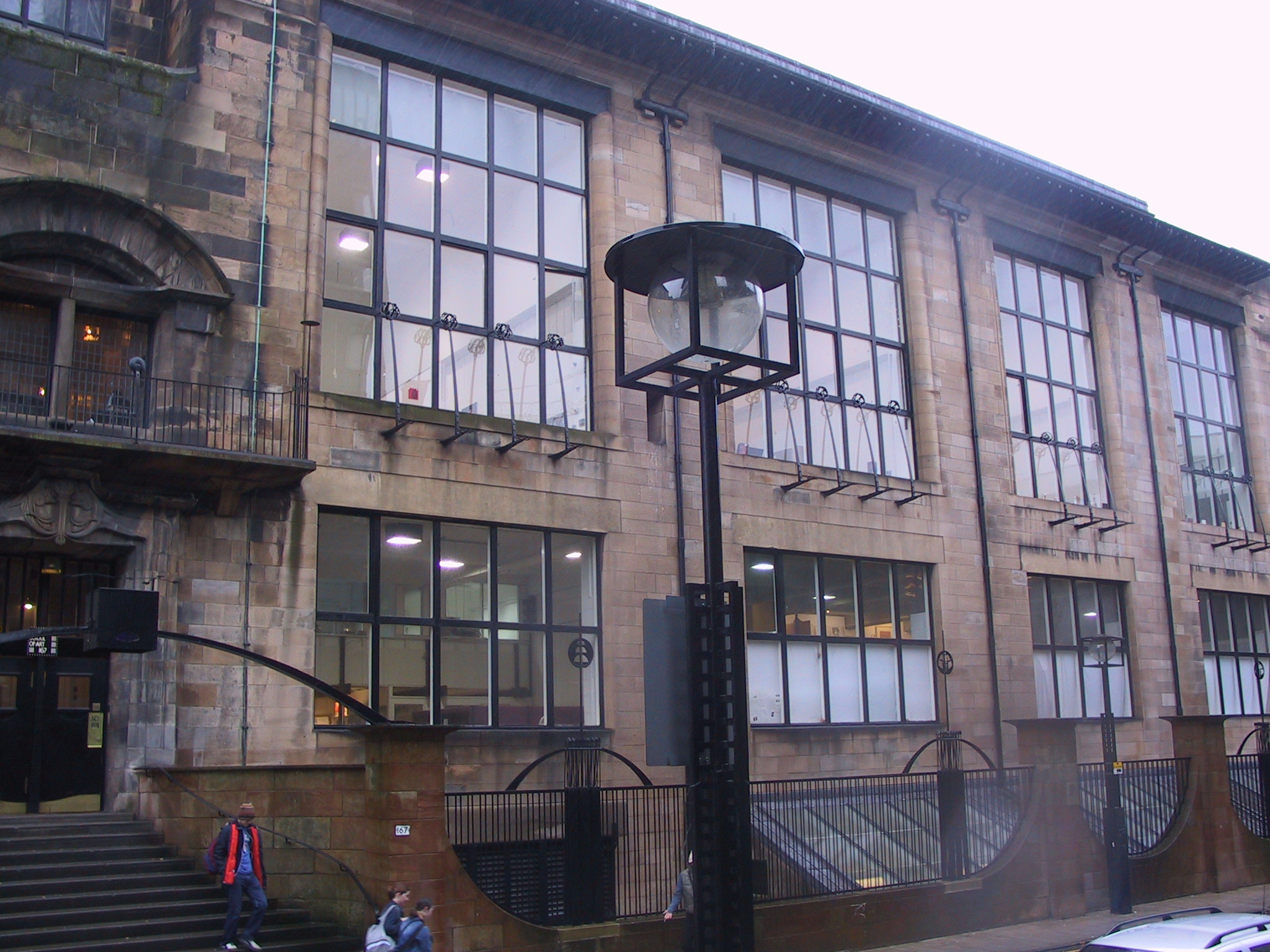
Glasgow School of Art, where Babianska studied.

As encouraged by her father, Brodie studied at the Glasgow School of Art from 1936 to 1940. In 1939 she was awarded a travelling scholarship to London, however as war was declared shortly afterwards she remained in Glasgow, returning the scholarship money. The same year she exhibited a self-portrait, titled 'Reflection' at the Royal Glasgow Institute of the Fine Arts, which, in 1940, was purchased by Glasgow City Council for Kelvingrove Art Gallery and Museum. This painting depicts the artist at the side of her easel, paintbrushes in hand. On graduating from Glasgow, she studied at the Hospitalfield School of Art during 1941.

== Career ==
In 1941 Brodie was commissioned by Glasgow Corporation to design and paint murals at the YMCA headquarters in Bath Street. She was helped by her close friend Marie de Banzie. Together they collaborated in the design of costume and stage sets for the Celtic Ballet, including Macbeth, Conte Russes, L'Obsession, Tam O'Shanter, Cloak of Feathers and a Ballet of the Book of the Dead amongst others. She also illustrated Scottish Art and Letters, and designed the cover for Poetry Scotland No.2.

Brodie was a founder member of New Art Club and the New Scottish Group along with J.D. Fergusson as President, exhibiting regularly with NSG.

Writing about the group's second show in 1944, art critic Robert Melville observed:

"Isabel Babianska and Marie de Banzie obviously work in close association, and are the most restless and experimental members of the group. They are the products of the Glasgow Art School, and in some of their works they very effectively employ the Gauguin-Wyndham Lewis synthesis which determines the style of Robert Colquhon, an artist from the same school, whose work has been exhibited in London. Their response to Jankel Adler has produced some dynamic paintings of war-machines in action, but it is in their portraits that they are particularly outstanding, and their interest in the expressive stylisation of the features of the human face will probably be responsible for their most significant work; they seem less inhibited and more soundly equipped for the approach to Picasso's special territory than most of the painters who have ventured near that field. Glasgow has reason to be proud of her young painters."

Babianska also exhibited at the 1947 Edinburgh International Festival, Murrayfield, at the Society of Independent Scottish Artists.

She continued to paint in London, and also worked successfully as a photographic fashion model for agencies including Dior, and was featured on the cover of various fashion magazines, including Vogue. She ran Whittaker Model Agency, inherited from her friend Michael Whittaker, until she died in 2006.

== Personal life ==
Her early work is signed in her maiden name, Isabel Brodie. In 1943 she married Count Tomasz Babianski, a Polish pilot officer. Thereafter she exhibited as Isabel Babianska. She had two daughters, named Monica and Irena. The first born 1945, and the second born in 1946, after they had moved to London.
