= Margaret Oliver Brown =

Scottish painter and illustrator

Margaret Oliver Brown (née MacDonald) (20 September 1912 – 17 November 1990) was a Scottish painter and illustrator. She worked as a commercial artist before studying painting at Glasgow School of Art (1937–41). She was a founder member of the New Scottish Group.

== Personal life ==
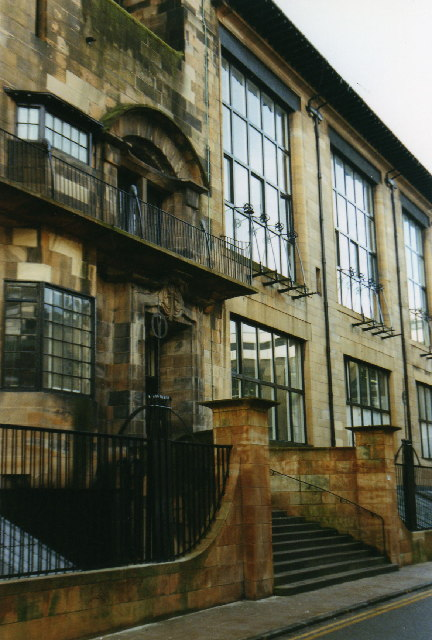
Glasgow School of Art, where Margaret Oliver Brown was a student 1937-41

Margaret Oliver Brown was born in Glasgow on 20 September 1912. Her father was a marine engineer from North Uist and her mother was from Fife. Brown was brought up in Pollokshields in Glasgow, with her two brothers, Ian and Alex. She attended the Scotland Street School, which was designed by Charles Rennie Mackintosh in the early 1900s.

On 4 August 1936 she married William Oliver Brown, a French teacher who was a well known political activist and Scottish nationalist. They had two children: Catriona (b.1944) and Una (b.1948). After her husband's death in 1976, Brown moved to sheltered accommodation in 1980. She moved to Norwich in 1987, to live with her daughter Una. She died on 17 November 1990.

== Career ==
In 1927 Brown started attending classes at the Publicity Club of Glasgow and gained certificates on Elementary Advertising. She also took an apprenticeship with a printing firm. She worked as Advertising Manager at Arnotts Department Store (Glasgow) from 1930 until 1936.

She was a founder member of the New Art Club, which was established in 1940 and renamed the New Scottish Group in 1942. She was a particular friend of other members Louise Annand, Millie Frood, Margaret Morris, Jankel Adler, Josef Herman and George Hannah. Throughout the 1940s she exhibited at the Royal Scottish Academy, Royal Glasgow Institute and the Society of Independent Scottish Artists, as well as with the New Scottish Group.

In 1949 Brown developed severe rheumatoid arthritis, cutting short her career as a painter. However, she was able to continue as a successful freelance illustrator during the 1950s and '60s. During this time she had a column in the Glasgow Evening Times called 'MOBservations' and also produced satirical political illustrations for her husband's political pamphlets.

== Works in Public Collections ==
- Self Portrait, 1939 (Perth & Kinross Council, Scotland)
- Oliver Brown, 1902 - 1976. Founder member of the Scottish National Party, c.1940 (Scottish National Portrait Gallery, National Galleries of Scotland, Edinburgh, Scotland)
- Self Portrait, late 1930s/early 1940s (Scottish National Portrait Gallery, National Galleries of Scotland, Edinburgh, Scotland)
- Wild Flowers, early 1940s (National Galleries of Scotland, Edinburgh, Scotland)
- Chrysanthemums, c.1945 (Perth & Kinross Council, Scotland)
- Suspicion, c.1945 (Perth & Kinross Council, Scotland)
- Female Portrait (Glasgow School of Art, Scotland)
- Male Portrait (Glasgow School of Art, Scotland)
