= Georges Banks =

Scottish female writer and artist

Anne Lavinia Cameron Banks (25 January 1885 – 28 November 1953), also known as Dot Banks and by the male pseudonym Georges Banks, was a Scottish writer and artist affiliated with avant-garde circles such as the Rhythm Group at the start of the 20th century.

== Biography ==
Banks was born in Edinburgh, the daughter of solicitor George Cameron Banks and Sophie Frances Rutherford Gowan. She never married. She died, aged 61, of congestive heart failure at the Royal Infirmary of Edinburgh.

== Work ==
For the 1912 publication How Pearl Button Was Kidnapped by the New Zealand writer Katherine Mansfield, Banks created a caricature of the writer, alongside sketches by her friend Henri Gaudier-Breszka, Othon Friesz and J.D. Fergusson.

According to curator Alicia Foster, Banks and fellow Rhythm artist Jessica Dismorr shared a fascination for modern dance and performance and they both worked as foreign correspondents for a French theatre magazine. Banks wrote the first review for the Ballets Russes in Rhythm, writing about the production Petrouchka composed by Igor Stravinsky. In September 1912, she reviewed the production Salomé featuring the acclaimed dancer Ida Rubinstein.

== Legacy ==
In 1912–13, sculptor Henri Gaudier-Brzeska created a caricature of Banks, which still exists in Kettle's Yard, University of Cambridge.

Following her death in 1953, her friend J.D. Fergusson recalled her life:

"Dot Banks (she called herself Georges Banks, because she felt, and I think rightly, that she resembled "George Sand"), was a remarkable woman, very charming, sympathetic, and aware she was the only Scotswoman in the modern movement in Paris at the beginning about 1907, and she was alive to all that was going on in painting, theatre, and literature. She wrote very well, and painted and drew very well.... She was in touch with the young artists, and made a real contribution by her criticism, which was frank with a sarcastic insight. She was part of a kind of life of that tin - which may never again be as wonderful, and it took people like "Georges" Banks to make it wonderful."

— John Duncan Fergusson, The Scotsman, 4 December 1953

The actor Esme Percy also eulogised her:

"With the passing of Miss Cameron Banks of Edinburgh, an outstanding personality has gone. She had a completely original and most perspicacious outlook on life, the gift of getting always at the heart of the matter. No ready-made thoughts, perfunctory judgments. or reach-me-down appreciations for her! She was the most individual of beings in an age of mass production, a mystic, a seer. Her mind was most catholic in its apprehension but her spiritual home was the soul of the Western Isles, especially Iona, and the Egypt of the Pharaohs. They seemed to be one for her. But though she lived in an ivory tower — if anyone did—she was keenly aware of the workaday world of to-day, and her unerring flair led her to discover and bring to light many contemporary artists."

— Esme Percy, The Scotsman, 5 December 1953

== See also ==
- Vorticism
