= William Crosbie (artist) =

Scottish painter

William (Bill) Crosbie (31 January 1915 – 15 January 1999) was a Scottish painter. His work hangs in all major museums and galleries in Scotland and is part of the Royal Collection.

== Early life ==
Crosbie was born in Hankou, China, to Scottish parents. The family returned to Glasgow in 1926, where Bill attended Glasgow Academy and, from 1932 to 1934, the Glasgow School of Art. After leaving art school, he travelled in Europe on a Haldane Travelling Scholarship. From 1937 to 1939, Crosbie lived in Paris, where he studied under Léger and Maillol. He described his time in Leger's studio as one of my proudest experiences.

== Work ==
He was at the centre of what he once described as "a little local Renaissance," which included Hugh MacDiarmid, J D Fergusson, James Bridie, T J Honeyman, and Basil Spence. Other regulars at his studio were the refugee artists Jankel Adler, Josef Herman, and Duncan Macrae (whose portrait by Crosbie is now hanging in the People's Palace).

An essential part of Crosbie's work after the war was his mural paintings, primarily commissioned by associating with architects like Basil Spence and Jack Coia. His commissions included a mural for the Festival of Britain in 1951. Crosbie also produced illustrations for books and designed the scenery for a ballet.

Crosbie was among the twentieth century's finest and most singular Scottish painters. His paintings hang in all the major museums and galleries in Scotland, the Royal Collection and the British Museum in London, and in private collections throughout the United Kingdom and abroad. There were major retrospective exhibitions of Crosbie's work at Aitken Dott's in 1980, Ewan Mundy's in 1990, and Perth Museum and Art Gallery in 1990.
