= Leslie Hunter =

Scottish painter (1877–1931)

George Leslie Hunter
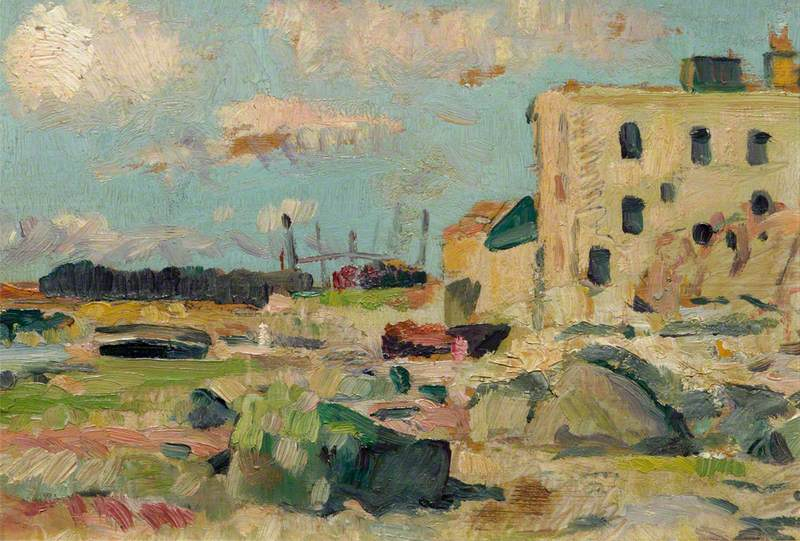
- The Beach, Largo, at Low Tide, date unknown, Aberdeen Art Gallery & Museums
- Born: 7 August 1877; Rothesay, Isle of Bute
- Died: 7 December 1931; Glasgow, Scotland
- Known for: Graphic artist; Artist in paper media & Oils
- Movement: Post-Impressionism
- Awards: Artist Member of Glasgow Art Club
- Patrons: T.J. Honeyman, Alexander Reid, Matthew Justice

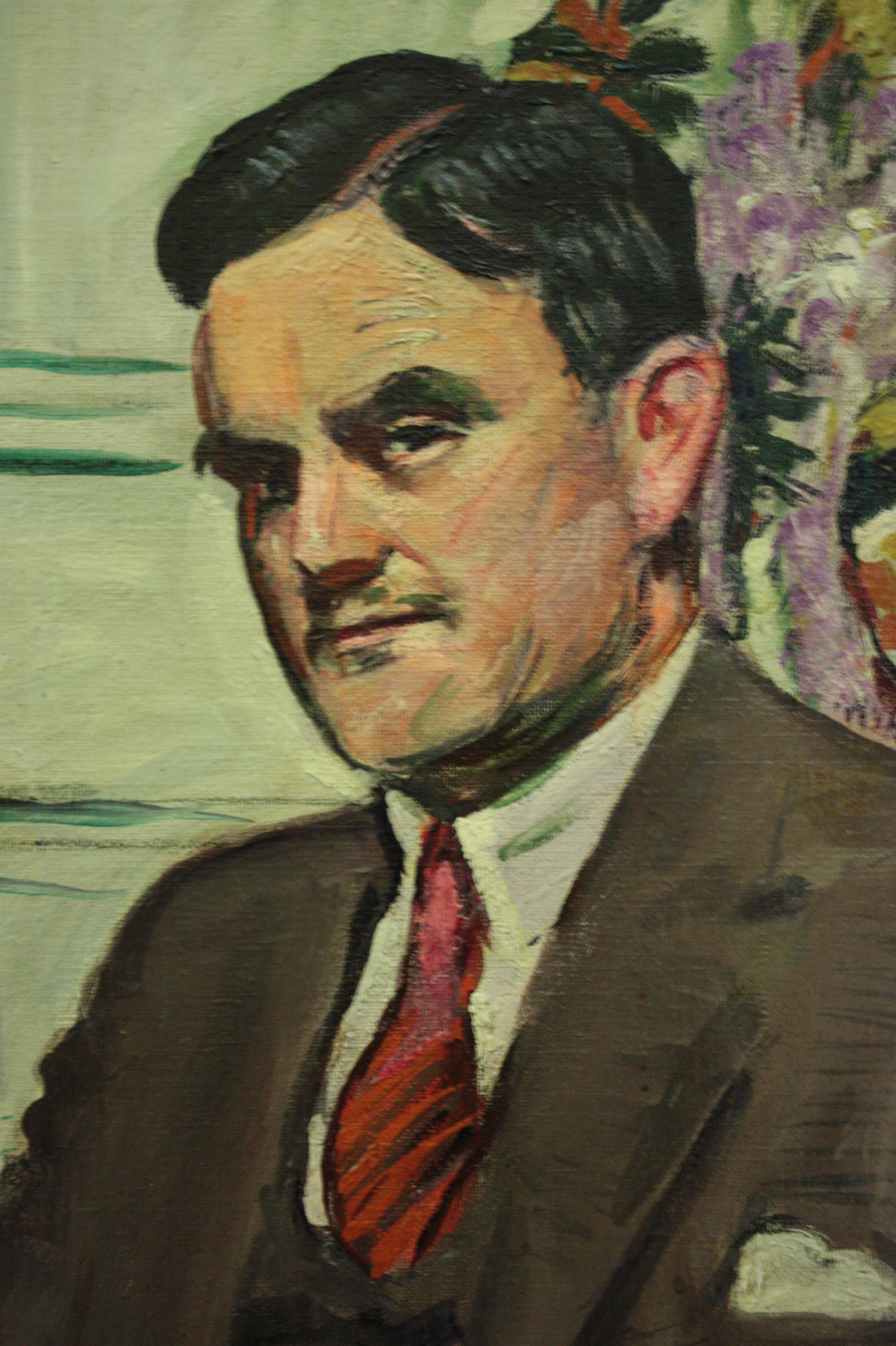
Dr Tom J Honeyman by Leslie Hunter c.1930

George Leslie Hunter (7 August 1877 – 7 December 1931) was a Scottish painter, regarded as one of the four artists of the Scottish Colourists group of painters. Christened simply George Hunter, he adopted the name Leslie in San Francisco, and Leslie Hunter became his professional name. Showing an aptitude for drawing at an early age, he was largely self-taught, receiving only elementary painting lessons from a family acquaintance. He spent fourteen years from the age of fifteen in the US, mainly in California. Hunter made an extended trip to Scotland, Paris and New York from 1903 to 1905. In 1906 he left San Francisco and returned to Scotland, painting and drawing there, notably in Fife and at Loch Lomond. Subsequently, he travelled widely in Europe, especially in the South of France, but also in the Netherlands, the Pas de Calais and Italy. He also returned to New York in 1924 and 1928–1929.

Hunter painted a variety of still-lifes, landscapes and portraits, and his paintings are critically acclaimed for their treatment of light and the effects of light. Except, what Hunter set out to do was not about light, but to capture the essence of nature through pure colour. His paintings became popular with more progressive critics and collectors during his lifetime and have grown to command high prices since his death, becoming among the most popular in Scotland.

== Biography ==
=== Early life ===
Hunter was born in Rothesay, at 7 Tower Street, on the Isle of Bute on 7 August 1877. He was the youngest child of five, born to William and Jeanie (née Stewart) Hunter. George, as he was then known, showed an aptitude for drawing when very young and when he was about thirteen, his mother arranged for him to have painting lessons with a lady acquaintance. In February 1892, Hunter's elder sister Catherine died. Shortly after, in March, another elder sibling, James, also died. Both were in their early twenties. It is thought they may have been victims of an influenza pandemic. William, the father, and Jeanie, seem already to have contemplated emigrating, because a home had been sold. Evidently, the tragic deaths sealed the matter, and the remaining family departed for California via New York on 1 September 1892, aboard the SS Ethiopia.

=== Emigration to California and move to San Francisco, leaving parents ===
Hunter was fifteen when he emigrated with his parents and two surviving siblings to California. Initially, he lived with his family on an orange grove, 50 miles east of Los Angeles. He continued sketching and loved the climate, but showed little interest in farm management. Hunter moved from Los Angeles to San Francisco in 1899 and began making a living primarily as a newspaper and journal illustrator. He counted among his friends and acquaintances, journalist Will Irwin, early photographer Arnold Genthe, poet Gelett Burgess, as well as significant literary figures such as Bret Harte and Jack London, all members of the San Francisco Bohemian Club. Hunter provided illustrations for Overland Monthly. In 1899, a full-page black and white drawing for Overland Monthly is signed G. Leslie Hunter, the first recorded occasion of his use of "Leslie". In 1902, Hunter became part of a group of artists that included Maynard Dixon, Gottardo Piazzoni, Xavier Martinez and Arthur Putnam. Together they founded the California Society of Arts, the short-lived alternative to the conservative San Francisco Art Association. Clearly, Hunter had a completely different artistic exposure compared with others of the Scottish Colourists group, such as John Duncan Fergusson or Samuel John Peploe. Hunter was at this stage quite a successful American graphic artist, considering his young age. "Sunset, The Pacific Monthly", was another journal commissioning his work and altogether, Smith & Marriner catalogue over two hundred publication and book illustrations commissioned from Hunter.

=== Beginnings in fine art ===
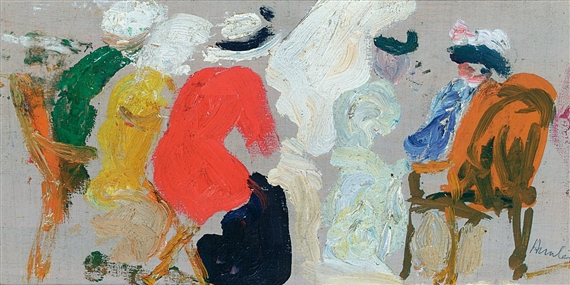
Figures in conversation, Étaples, one of the paintings from 1914 in which Hunter established his style

In 1904, Hunter made a visit to Paris, funded by his earnings as an illustrator. He was inspired by the numerous artistic experiences there, and became fully resolved to take up oil painting. When he returned to San Francisco in 1905, he began preparing for his first solo exhibition, which was to be held the following year. However, Hunter's early work was destroyed in the fire that followed the 1906 San Francisco earthquake, and he returned to Scotland shortly afterwards, settling in Glasgow. Initially he continued to make his living there primarily as an illustrator. His oil painting began with still lifes on black backgrounds, influenced by the Dutch style.

In 1908, whilst back in Paris, Hunter met Alice Toklas, whom he had known previously in San Francisco. She took him to see the art collection at 27 rue de Fleurus, that was being started by Gertrude Stein and her brother Leo Stein. The collection included wildly-coloured Fauve works by Matisse, and early works by Picasso. Toklas wrote that the pictures shocked Hunter profoundly, and he wished he had never gone to see them. Nevertheless, his consciousness had been jolted.

In November 1913 the influential art dealer Alexander Reid gave Hunter his first one-man-show, at his gallery at West George Street. It was popular but the public did not have any real understanding of his sense of colour and line. At the show Hunter was probably introduced to the Dundee collector John Tattersall. Through Reid, Hunter most likely first met William McInnes of Gow, Harrison & Company (shipbuilders) who became a close friend and patron to Hunter. McInnes went on to buy 23 works in total.

Hunter's landscape style began to change after visits to Etaples in 1913 and 1914, although Hunter did not necessarily appear to be part of the existing Etaples art colony. Here, inspired by French art and the local landscape, he began to develop the style and ability that would later identify him as a colourist. However, with the onset of the First World War Hunter was forced to leave Paris and return to Scotland. Hunter had become an American citizen in 1906 and conscription was not introduced until early 1916. Possibly in response to the government's urging able-bodied men and women to help with the war effort, Hunter moved from Glasgow to his cousin's farm near Larkhall where he worked on the land until the end of the war.

In Scotland, Alexander Reid was acting as his agent, remaining in constant contact with him throughout the First World War. In March 1916, Hunter held his second one-man exhibition with Reid in Glasgow. Hunter's work at this stage of his career focused primarily on still lifes, inspired by Chardin, Kalf and Manet. During the 1920s, Hunter began to be associated with a group of three other artists: John Duncan Fergusson, F. C. B. Cadell, and Samuel Peploe. The four of them became known as the Scottish Colourists, although the term was not used until 1948, by which time only Fergusson was still alive.

In July 1917 (through Reid) the collector William Burrell bought his first Hunter: "Peaches" for 10 guineas and in September 1917 bought a still life for £38.

=== European travel and return to Fife ===
In 1922, Hunter began to make a series of trips to mainland Europe, where he visited Paris, Venice, Florence and the Riviera. Fergusson accompanied him on a number of these visits. Hunter's visits abroad produced a large number of paintings and his style changed noticeably in this period of European travel as he began using dabs of colour placed instinctively to portray underlying form.

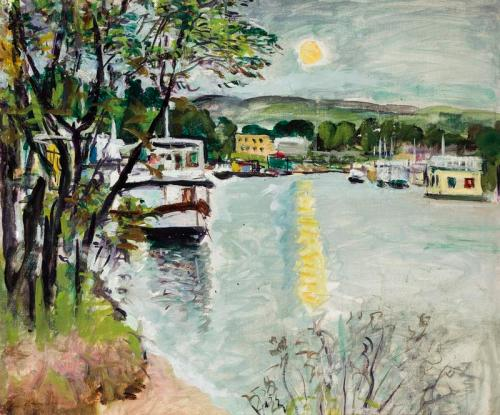
Moonlight, Loch Lomond (c.1924) Aberdeen Archives, Gallery and Museums

When Hunter returned from his first series of trips abroad, in 1922, he settled in Fife, on the east coast of Scotland and, between 1924 and 1927, he remained in Scotland, dividing his time between Fife and Glasgow. His paintings from this period include a number inspired by views of Loch Lomond, and these landscapes increasingly took inspiration from the work of Cézanne to create colourful and atmospheric compositions. In 1925, Hunter's work was displayed at an exhibition in Leicester Square in London, along with works by Peploe, Cadell and Fergusson. Walter Sickert, in his introduction to the exhibition, wrote that "Hunter uses the refractory ... to inspired ends on normal and traditional lines".

Hunter travelled again to the South of France on a number of occasions between 1927 and 1929, and based himself at Saint-Paul-de-Vence. He sent paintings back to Reid to be exhibited in Glasgow and London, but he spent a great deal of time sketching and his output of finished oil paintings was low. One exhibition in London had to be postponed due to a lack of paintings. The France trips culminated in 1929 with a critically acclaimed exhibition at the Ferargil Galleries in New York.

=== London, ill-health and death ===
However, shortly after returning to the French Riviera in 1929, Hunter suffered a severe breakdown, forcing his sister to bring him home to Scotland in September. He recovered, and began to paint a number of portraits of his friends, including one of Dr Tom Honeyman, the Director of the Glasgow Art Gallery and Museum from 1939 until 1954. Honeyman, at the time an art dealer, had assisted Hunter in developing his career, and painting the portrait may have been a gesture of thanks.

In 1930 he embarked upon a series of drawings and watercolours of Hyde Park, which were due to be exhibited in London. Hunter hoped to move to the city permanently, as he found it livelier than Glasgow and the art market was more secure. However, his health deteriorated and he began to suffer badly from stomach pains. He died in Glasgow in the Claremont Nursing Home on 7 December 1931, aged 54. The cause of death was cardiac failure due to blood poisoning, following an unsuccessful gall bladder operation. A member of Glasgow Art Club, work by Hunter was included in the club's Memorial Exhibition of 1935, in memory of those of its members who had died since the First World War.

== Popularity ==
Hunter's paintings were popular with critics during his lifetime, and he had successful exhibitions in Glasgow, London and New York. Shortly before his death, the Glasgow Herald commented that while Hunter was already "well known as a painter of landscape and still-life," his move to portrait painting would "cause a good deal of interest and discussion."

Many years after his death, solo exhibitions of Hunter's paintings were still held and, in 1953, the display of a selection of watercolours and paintings in Glasgow attracted numerous visitors. The art critic of the Glasgow Herald described the "varied and uneven genius" of the painter, and praised one painting as having been executed with "such a freedom and economy of touch one cannot well see how any amount of extra thought or technical application could have bettered it."

Paintings by Hunter have gone on to sell for large sums in the early 21st century, with one painting described as the "star lot" in a Bonhams auction in June 2010 selling for £144,000. Another painting was sold in June 2010 for £78,000. Nick Curnow, head of pictures at Lyon & Turnbull, said of it "This is a very special painting, so typical of Hunter."

== Style ==
Hunter focused for much of his life on landscapes and on still lifes, working in both pen and ink and oil on canvas. His still lifes of fruit are particularly distinctive, but he also painted a variety of landscapes, especially of Scotland and France. In his earlier paintings, Hunter was influenced by Cézanne to produce domestic landscapes. Later, however, in common with the other members of the Scottish colourists movement, he was heavily influenced by contemporary French artists like Monet and Matisse, and his paintings began to make bolder and more energetic use of colour.

Hunter particularly strove to capture in his paintings the effects of light, and would repeatedly paint the same objects or locations under a range of lighting conditions. His brush style was influenced by the French avant garde and, especially in his later work, is described by art critics as '"open and free" and "energetic".
