= Samuel Peploe =

Scottish painter (1871–1935)

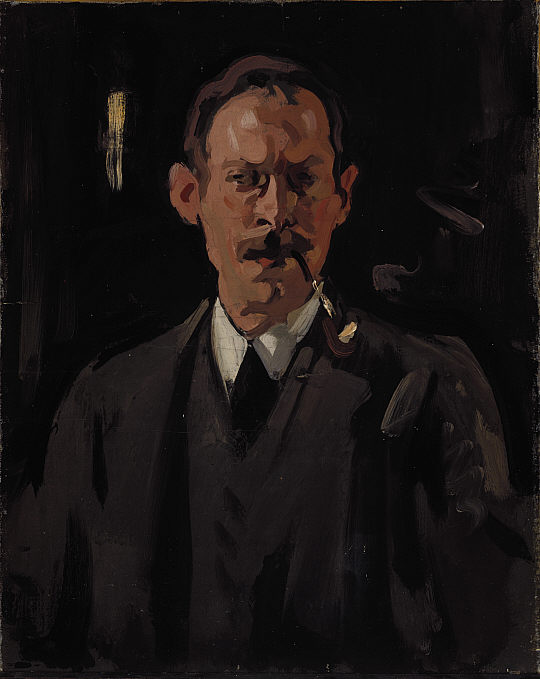
- Self-Portrait (1904)
- Born: Samuel John Peploe; 27 January 1871; Edinburgh
- Died: 11 October 1935 (aged 64); Edinburgh

Samuel John Peploe (pronounced PEP-low; 27 January 1871 – 11 October 1935) was a Scottish Post-Impressionist painter, noted for his still life works and for being one of the group of four painters that became known as the Scottish Colourists. The other colourists were John Duncan Fergusson, Francis Cadell and Leslie Hunter.

== Biography ==
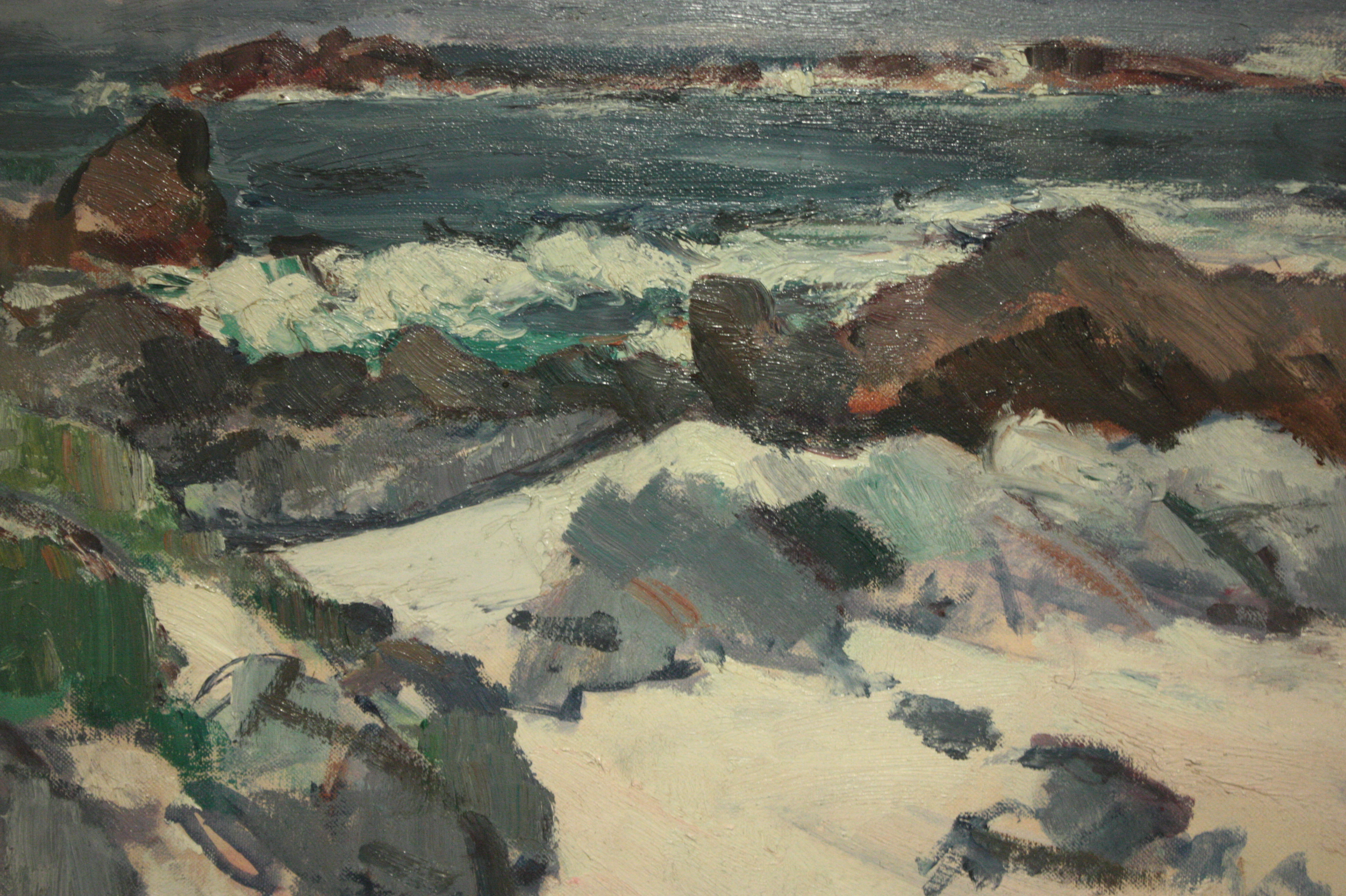
A Rocky Shore, Iona by Samuel Peploe

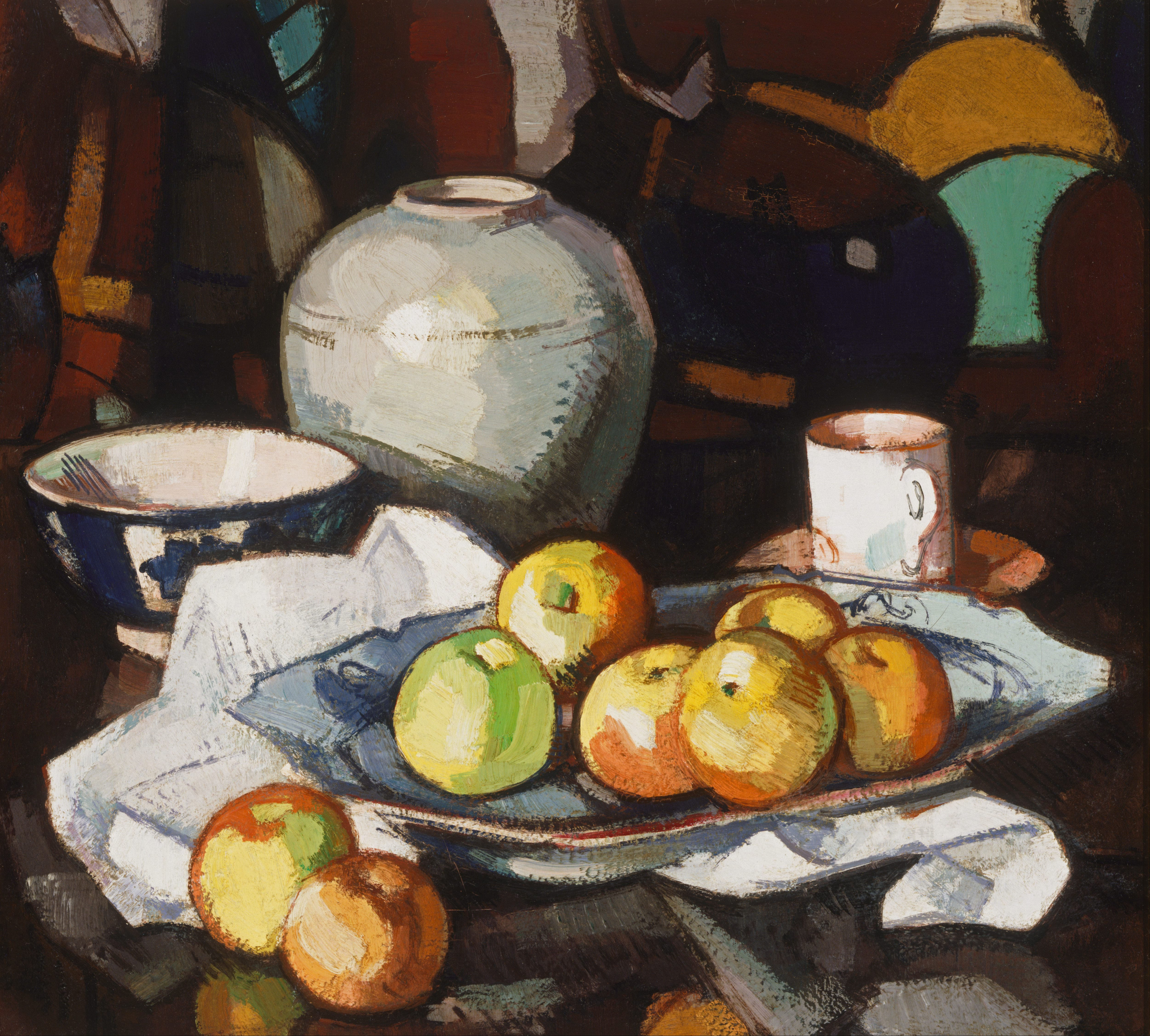
Still life: apples and jar, circa 1912–16, Art Gallery of New South Wales

Born in Edinburgh at 39 Manor Place, he was the son of a bank manager, Robert Luff Peploe (1828–1884). He left school at 14 and was initially apprenticed as a trainee lawyer to Scott, Bruce and Glover WS at 1 Hill Street in Edinburgh. Around 1889 he began studying art at the Trustees Academy in Edinburgh.

Peploe studied at the Royal Scottish Academy schools from 1893 to 1894, and then at the Académie Julian and Académie Colarossi in Paris, where he shared a room with the Scottish painter Robert Brough. He visited the Netherlands in 1895, returning with reproductions of work by Rembrandt and Frans Hals. From 1901, he undertook painting trips to northern France and the Hebrides with his friend J.D. Fergusson, another of the Scottish Colourists. Inspired by the bright sunlight, he experimented with the bold use of colour, and the influence of the rustic realism of French painters is evident in his landscapes.

Peploe was the first of the Scottish Colourists to have a one-man-show: in 1903 at Aitken & Dott in Edinburgh, at which he sold 19 paintings. Alexander Reid sold Peploe's first work to America in 1905 - to Charles Kurtz of the Albright Art Gallery in Buffalo, New York.

At his second exhibition in the Scottish Gallery in 1909 Peploe adopted a new style which did not please the dealers, with all sixty paintings were bought by McOmish Dott of Aitken Dott for a total of £450. The dealer George Proudfoot offered only £50 for 22 canvasses. Peploe was persuaded by his dealers to revert to his original style.

In 1910, Peploe married Margaret MacKay (1873–1958), whom he had known since 1894. He also moved to Paris in 1910, a period which saw him concentrate increasingly on still life and landscape painting. His still-life works show the influence of Manet, with combinations of fluid brushwork, thick impasto and dark backgrounds with strong lighting. Returning to Scotland in 1912 he found that his usual dealer refused his work and Peploe was obliged to stage his own exhibition. In 1913 he was back in France with his wife and young son, painting with J.D. Fergusson and Anne Estelle Rice in Cassis during the summer. After his return to Scotland on the outbreak of war, Peploe went on regular painting trips with friends to many parts of the country, and during the 1920s he spent several summers with Francis Cadell, another Scottish Colourist, painting in Iona.

Not until December 1915 did Peploe have his second one-man-show: organised by the dealer Alexander Reid at his St Vincent Street Gallery in Glasgow. However, only two paintings sold: "Town in Brittany" to John Blyth for £12, and "Roses, Black Background" bought by William McInnes for £40. Reid urged Blyth to start investing in Peploe, which he did: buying 85 works between 1915 and 1962.

In July 1926 William Burrell bought "Still Life with Roses" for £70 and "Cafe and Liquer" for £98, each from McNeill Reid at a small profit to Reid of around 6%. Also in 1926, Robert Wemyss Honeyman of Kirkcaldy began to collect Peploes, beginning with an Iona seascape for only £20.

Peploe was strongly influenced by French painting throughout his life. Although his work never became overly abstract, it was notable for its use of strong colour, tight composition, and meticulous execution. Influences are said to include de Segonzac, Cézanne, Matisse and Van Gogh.

He died in Edinburgh in 1935. Peploe's younger son Denis followed his father's career. Peploe is buried in the family plot in Dean Cemetery in Edinburgh. His name is listed near the end of several names on a stone to the north side of the main east–west path, towards the west end.

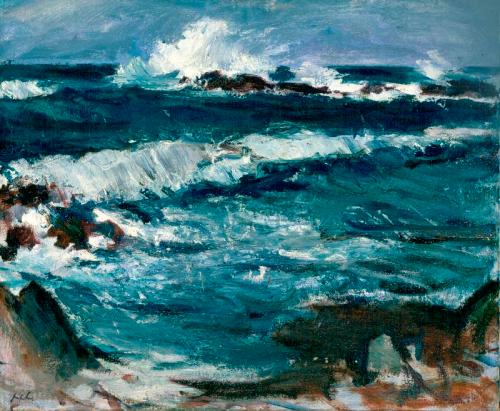
Stormy Weather, Iona (c. 1929) Aberdeen Archives Gallery and Museums

== Legacy ==
Peploe's 1905 painting Still Life with Coffee Pot, sold on 26 May 2011 at Christie's in London for £937,250, is one of the most expensive Scottish paintings sold at auction. The previous record for a work by Peploe was £623,650 for Tulips, sold in 2010. In October 2012, the Peploe painting Pink Roses sold for £225,000. The painting had been relegated to a spare room because the owner's wife did not like it.

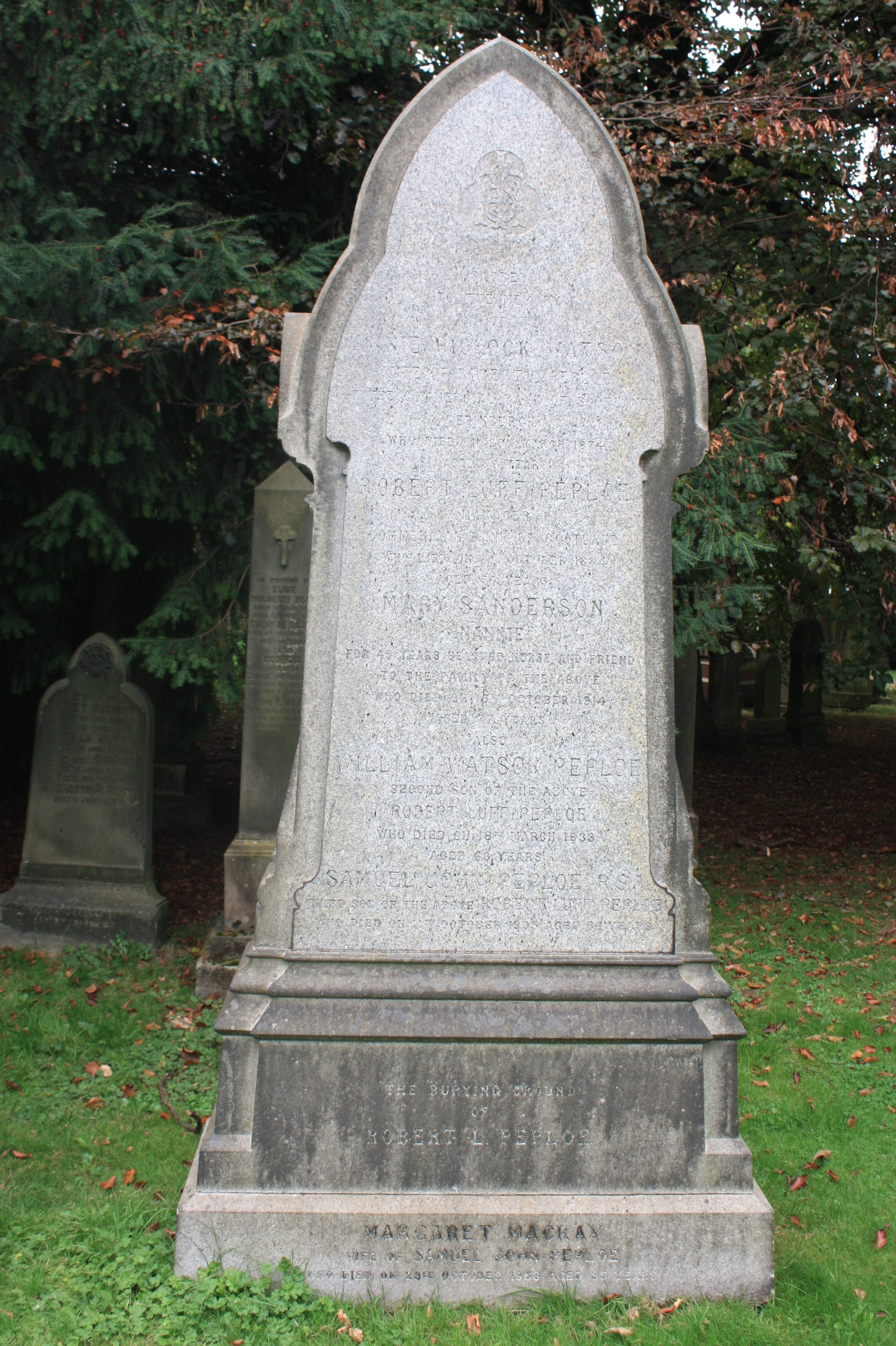
Peploe's grave, Dean Cemetery

Kirkcaldy Museum and Art Gallery holds the largest collection of Peploe's paintings aside from the National Galleries of Scotland.
