= Scottish Colourists =

Group of painters

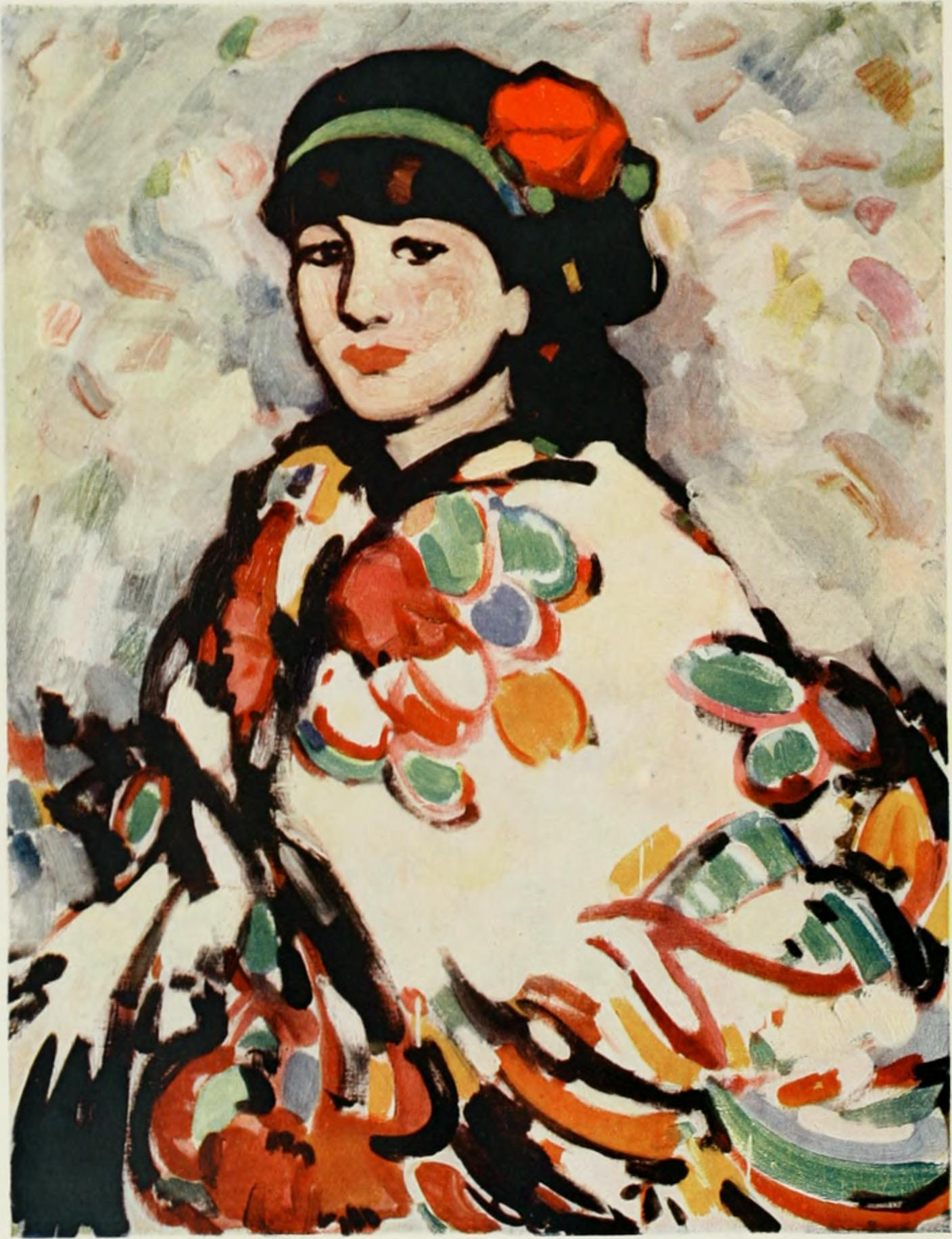
John Duncan Fergusson, The new spirit in drama and art, 1912

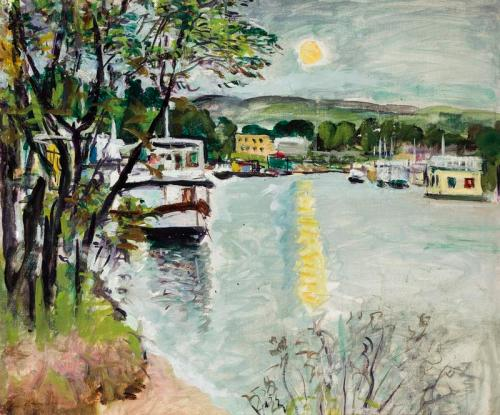
Leslie Hunter, Moonlight, Loch Lomond (c.1924) Aberdeen Archives, Gallery and Museums

The Scottish Colourists were a group of four painters, three from Edinburgh, whose Post-Impressionist work, though not universally recognised initially, came to have a formative influence on contemporary Scottish art and culture. The four artists, Francis Cadell, John Duncan Fergusson, Leslie Hunter and Samuel Peploe, were prolific painters spanning the turn of the twentieth century until the beginnings of World War II. While now banded as one group with a collective achievement and a common sense of British identity, it is a misnomer to believe their artwork or their painterly careers were homogeneous.

Generally however, the group shared a common interest in the artistic developments occurring in France and are shown to dabble with different styles such as Cubism, Post-Impressionism, Fauvism, and Futurism. The movement seemed to fall out of favour by the end of World War II, and did not experience a revival until the 1980s.

Their works are now in many Scottish art galleries, including the Scottish National Gallery of Modern Art, and other museums in the UK and abroad.

== History ==
The Scottish Colourists combined their training in France and the work of French Impressionists and Fauvists, such as Monet, Matisse and Cézanne, with the painting traditions of Scotland. A forerunner of this movement was William McTaggart (1835–1910), a Scottish landscape painter who was influenced by Post-Impressionism. He is regarded as one of the great interpreters of the Scottish landscape and is often labelled the "Scottish Impressionist".

The expression ‘Scottish Colourists’ according to Macmillan may have first been used as early as 1915 in the Studio magazine. Its specific association in print, again according to Macmillan, seems to have been first used by T J Honeyman, the art critic and director of Glasgow Art Gallery, in his book Three Scottish Colourists published in 1950.

The four artists did in fact exhibit together, for the first time in 1924 in Paris at an exhibition at the Galerie Barbazanges entitled ‘Les Peintres de l’Ecosse Moderne’ (Bilcliffe) . The following year, they showed together at an exhibition in London at the Leicester Gallery. In total, the four artists exhibited three times over the course of their lives.

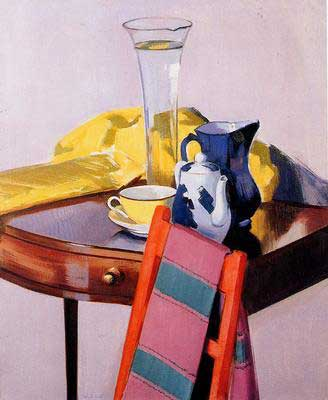
Francis Cadell, The Vase of Water, 1922

The Scottish Colourists were internationally known during their lifetimes but their work fell out of favour by World War II, until they were rediscovered in the 1980s and subsequently played an influential role in the development of Scottish art.

== Artistic style ==
While each of the four artists had a unique style, their work shared common interests in experimentation with light and shade, planar brushstrokes, bold use of colour, and a vibrant and confident tone. Their subject matter is often considered conservative compared to their French counterparts, since much of it consisted of island landscapes, Edinburgh interiors and fashionable models.

Much of their early work was influenced by the likes of Édouard Manet and the French Impressionists. Manet's influence can be seen in both the Colourists’ early colour scheme, which used soft, muted tones, and in their thick brushstrokes. Peploe's 'White Period' shows such influence with the subtle balance of tone and colour, and a rich creaminess in the paint's texture.

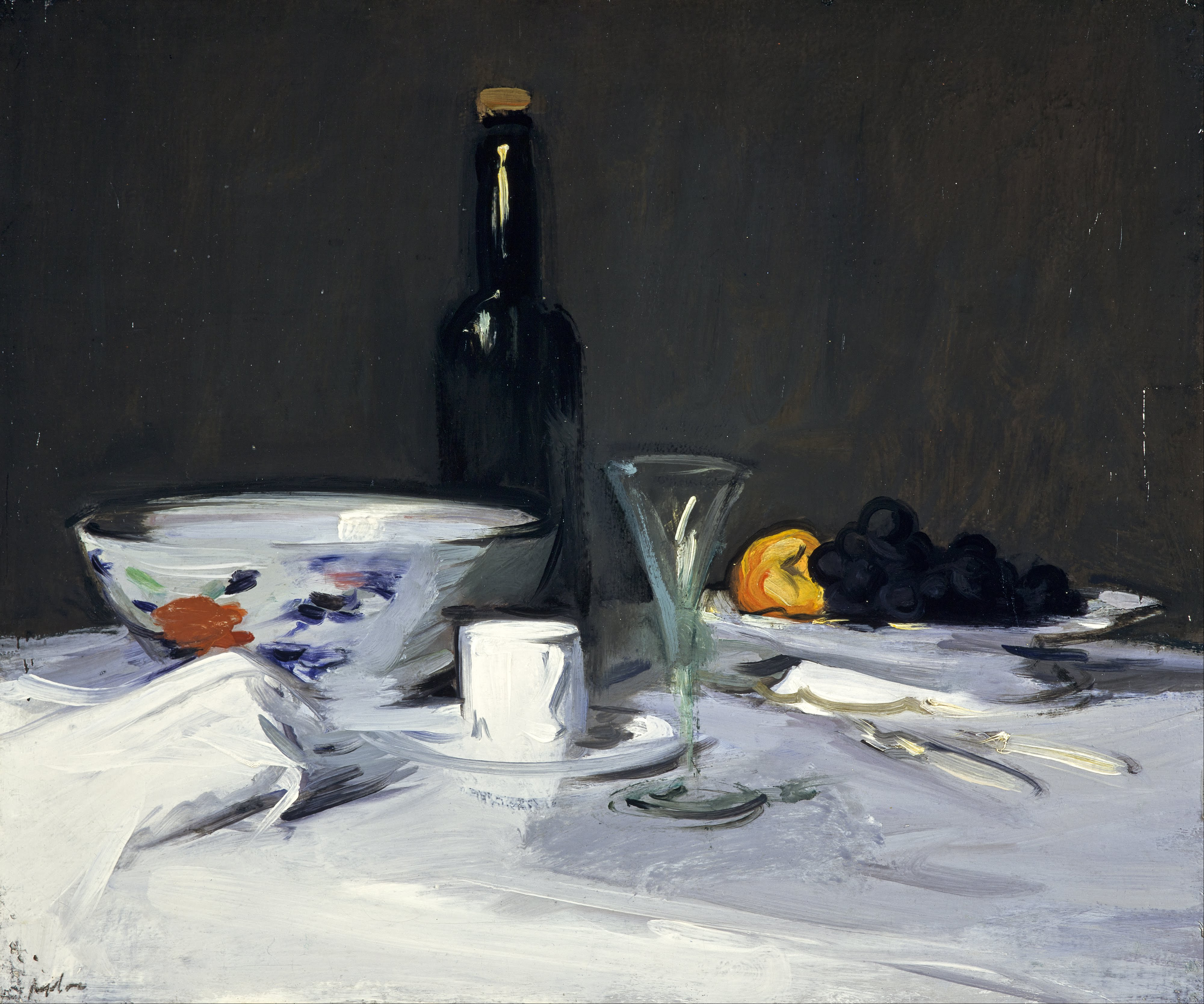
Samuel Peploe, The Black Bottle, about 1905, National Galleries of Scotland, Edinburgh

However, as French visual culture developed in the early 20th century, so did the Colourists' artistic style. J.D. Fergusson was the first in the group to feel the influence of the Cubists and Futurists, who experimented with rhythm as a way to connect the foreground and background of works. Rhythm became a continuous trend in his work, with critics later commenting on his outstanding ability to translate the joy and musicality of his subjects through his use of colour. Alongside Cubism, later experiments with the styles of Post-Impressionism can be seen in the Matisse-like use of green paint to convey shadows, and the structural and tonal landscape compositions influenced by Cézanne.

This is not to say that the movement only copied the styles and themes of French art. They "absorbed and reworked the strong and vibrant colours of contemporary French painting into a distinctive Scottish idiom during the 1920s and 1930s". Peploe stated that his style was an attempt to simultaneously find truth through light, form and colour, while also remain faithful to one's own emotions and understandings of the art he is creating. The impact of the Scottish Celticism movement can be seen in the works of J.D. Fergusson. Celticism focused on abstract forms and detailed surface pattern, rearranging space, and composition in an almost Cubist capacity.

== Major collections ==
Their work is featured in the Aberdeen Art Gallery in Aberdeen, Scotland; the J. D. Fergusson Gallery in Perth, Scotland; the University of Stirling, The Hunterian, the Scottish National Gallery of Modern Art in Edinburgh, and the Kelvingrove Art Gallery and Museum in Glasgow. The Kirkcaldy Museum and Art Gallery is said to house the largest collection of works by Peploe and McTaggart. From 18 October 2019 - 1 February 2020 Abbot Hall Art Gallery, Kendal, hosted an exhibition of the Scottish Colourists largely based on works from the Fleming Collection.
