= Tom Honeyman =

British art dealer (1891–1971)

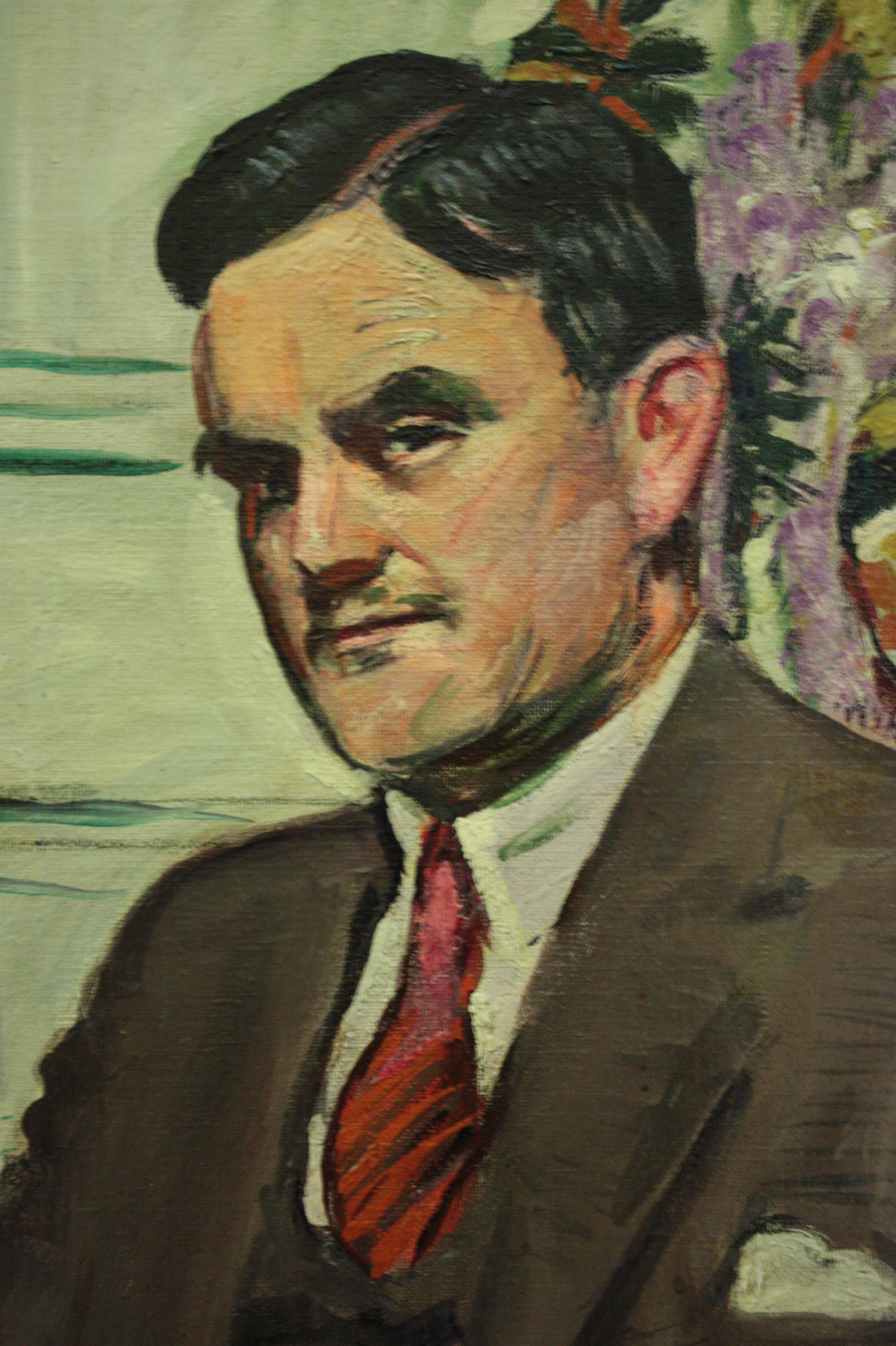
Tom Honeyman by Leslie Hunter c. 1930

Thomas John Honeyman (10 June 1891 – 5 July 1971) was an art dealer and gallery director, becoming the most acclaimed director of Kelvingrove Art Gallery and Museum, Glasgow.

Born near Queen's Park, Glasgow, Tom Honeyman studied medicine at the University of Glasgow before serving with the Royal Army Medical Corps during the First World War. He studied medicine, graduating at Glasgow University prior to distinguished service with the RAMC overseas in the First World War.

== Career ==
Tom Honeyman practised medicine in the East End of Glasgow before changing careers in 1929 to become an art dealer with Alex Reid & Lefevre. He moved to the firm's London premises in 1932.

After working as an art dealer, Honeyman became Director of Glasgow Art Galleries and Museums in 1939, a position he held until 1954.. Honeyman went on to make an enormous contribution to artistic and cultural life of Glasgow during his 15 years in the post. He greatly increased the standing and profile of the Glasgow Art Galleries & Museums through high-profile publicity and successful exhibitions which, for example, brought queues to see Van Gogh's paintings, and numerous other special exhibitions.

Honeyman's best-known acquisition was Salvador Dalí's Christ of St. John of the Cross, which he purchased for Glasgow in 1952 for £8,200. The purchase was controversial at the time because of its cost and modern style, but the painting became one of the best-known works in the city's collection.. It is one of the many jewels of the city's art collection and has proven commercially remunerative, with displays and reproduction fees covering the original cost several times over.

Honeyman played a leading role in securing Sir William Burrell's decision to gift his collection of art and antiquities to Glasgow in 1944. The collection later became known as the Burrell Collection. In the same year he was instrumental in establishing the Glasgow Art Galleries & Museums Association, an independent charitable society, with membership open to all, to encourage and enhance the enjoyment and public use of art galleries and museums. It continues today as the Friends of Glasgow Museums. In 1948 he originated the publication by the association of the quarterly arts magazine The Scottish Art Review, which continued for over 40 years. It started in 1947 as the Glasgow Art Review.

In 1953 he was elected Rector of the University of Glasgow. Yet, Honeyman, with great experience and the support of the public, was forced to leave his post in 1954 having lost the support of his political master, the new chairman of the Glasgow Corporation Art Committee.

Passionate about the cultural life of Glasgow, Honeyman, in partnership with playwright James Bridie and cinema entrepreneur George Singleton, founded the Glasgow Citizen's Theatre in 1943. Together with Bridie, Honeyman was a founder of the Arts Council in Scotland. He was also a founder member of the Scottish Tourist Board. Honeyman wrote an autobiographical book, largely memoirs of his time as director of the Art Gallery, called Art and Audacity (Collins, 1971). He was the subject of a further book, From Dali to Burrell; The Tom Honeyman Story by Jack Webster, published in 1997 by Black & White.

Tom Honeyman was the recipient of the 1943 St Mungo Prize, awarded to the individual who has done most in the previous three years to improve and promote the city of Glasgow.

Academic offices
Preceded by John MacCormick	Rector of the University of Glasgow; 1953–1956	Succeeded by Rab Butler
