= Margaret Morris (dancer) =

British dancer, choreographer, artist and teacher (1891–1980)

- Morris in the 1920s photographed by Fred Daniels
- Born: 10 March 1891; Kensington, London, England
- Died: 29 February 1980 (aged 88); Glasgow, Scotland
- Occupations: Choreographer and dancer
- Partner: John Duncan Fergusson

Margaret Morris (10 March 1891 – 29 February 1980) was a British dancer, choreographer, artist and teacher. She founded the Margaret Morris Movement, Celtic Ballet and two Scottish National Ballets in Glasgow (1947) and in Pitlochry (1960). Morris devised a system of movement notation, which was first published in 1928.

== Early life ==
Although Morris was born in London, she lived with her parents until the age of five in France. She had no formal academic education, but attended dancing classes. In 1894 she began reciting professionally in French and later in English, at parties, smoking concerts and court drawing rooms. In 1899 she had her first stage engagement in pantomime - Little Red Riding Hood at the Theatre Royal, Plymouth, playing First Fairy 'Twinkle Star' with solo dances and recitations before a front drop.

In 1900 she joined the Ben Greet Shakespearian Company and played 'Puck' in A Midsummer Night's Dream in the Royal Botanic Society Gardens in Regent's Park. She remained with the company for three years, acting and dancing. In 1903 she played child parts in Drury Lane melodramas and in The Water Babies at The Garrick Theatre. Between tours she studied dancing with John D'Auban, ballet master at Drury Lane. She began to compose dances of her own and at the age of twelve reacted against the limitation of the Italian classical ballet technique. She began creating more natural exercises but realised also that a basic training was necessary. In 1907 she joined the Benson Shakespearian Company as 'Ingenue Principal Dancer' and understudy to Lady Benson.

In 1909 Morris met Raymond Duncan, the brother of Isadora Duncan, who taught her the six Classical Greek dance positions. She adapted and used these as the basis of her own system of movement. Morris was also inspired by Duncan's use of shorthand notation for recording these positions. In 1910 she choreographed the dances for Gluck's Orpheus and Eurydice which was staged by Marie Brema at the Savoy Theatre in London. She trained the dancers in her new technique for a month before rehearsals. She also designed the costumes and decor. The Daily Express said "The triumph of the production is Miss Morris's Dance of the Furies, nothing like it has ever been seen on the London stage". That year she also played Water in The Blue Bird by Maeterlinck at the Haymarket Theatre. She also produced the dances for Sir Herbert Tree's production of Henry VIII.

== Margaret Morris Movement ==
In 1910, Morris met John Galsworthy who encouraged her to open her own school in St Martin's Lane, London. That same year she toured with her own company, first called "Margaret Morris and her Dancing Children". In 1911 she was the choreographer and principal dancer for The Little Dream, a fantasy by Galsworthy, at Annie Horniman's Gaiety Theatre, Manchester. She also created the dancing scenery for Rutland Boughton's opera The Birth of Arthur at the Winter Gardens, Bournemouth.

In 1912 she created the part of Guinevere Megan in The Pigeon by John Galsworthy at the Royal Theatre, acting with Gladys Cooper and Dennis Eadie. That same year she had a season at The Royal Court Theatre, London where she performed such ballets as Callisto by Maurice Hewlett and The Little Dream by Galsworthy. She started the first small theatre in London - Kings Road, Chelsea - giving Christmas Seasons for Children performed by children, including Angela and Hermione Baddeley and Phyllis Calvert. She won acclaim from the press as the first woman 'actor, manager' and the youngest, as she was only 21. In 1913 she took a troupe to Paris to dance at the Théâtre Marigny on the Champs Elysees. In 1915, she produced at her theatre an interpretation of Beethoven's 7th Symphony, costumes designed by John Duncan Fergusson and subsequently performed with full orchestra at Bournemouth Winter Gardens and at Harrogate.

In 1917 Morris started the first Summer School at Devon which has since been held annually to the present date except for the war years. In 1922 she started the first 'Educational School' in England to combine normal educational subjects with educational training in dancing and acting. Fergusson became the art director of all her schools. Painting and design became an integral part of the students curriculum which already included acting, dance composition and improvisation, normal educational subjects and her system of Dance Notation.

I first realised the absolute necessity of relating movement with form and colour when studying painting of the modern movement in Paris in 1913. From that time I incorporated it as one of the main studies in my school. In this connection I am deeply indebted to J D Ferguson, the painter, who for years has taught the painting design and sculpture in my school and who first made me realise the possibilities of theatrical work considered from the visual point of view, and the value of the study of form and colour as a means of education.

The syllabus followed at her schools (as of 1925):

1. The Margaret Morris method of physical culture and dancing
2. Dance composition
3. Theory of movement: Breathing
4. Theory of practice of teaching
5. Painting, design and sculpture
6. Notation of movement
7. Property and mask making
8. Dressmaking
9. Music training
10. Class singing
11. Musical composition
12. Literature; study of words; writing of plays and poems; essays
13. Diction and acting
14. Lecturing and discussion
15. Stage management, including lighting
16. Production of play and ballets
17. General organisation and business management
18. Swimming
19. Ballroom dancing

The Margaret Morris Movement was chosen to represent Britain at the 1931 Dance Festival in Florence, Italy. In April 1935, the Margaret Morris dancers performed the ballet Electric Revolutions in Seven Episodes, designed by Margaret Morris and Elizabeth Ainsworth, at the Electrical Association for Women's annual ball.

== Dancing as exercise ==
In 1925 Morris began an interest in the remedial aspects of movement and gave her first lecture demonstration to doctors in London on the remedial possibilities of her exercises. She took a course at St Thomas' Hospital in Physiotherapy which she passed with distinction in 1930. She had great faith in the value of her system for the handicapped, believing that "the more normal you make people feel, the more normal they would become". She extended her exercises into sports training, writing a book with the tennis star Suzanne Lenglen, and tried to have her methods accepted in schools by the education authorities. Although she achieved only limited acceptance in this area, her influence was immense on the modern practice of physical education, on remedial work, and in choreographic innovation. In 1937, she became a founder member of National Advisory Council of Physical Training and Recreation.

== Ballet ==
At the outbreak of the Second World War, Margaret Morris relocated to Glasgow. In 1940 she formed the Celtic Ballet Club and produced several big ballets for war charities. In 1947 she formed a small professional company - Celtic Ballet of Scotland - and toured in Glasgow and France. The Celtic Ballet utilised both Margaret's own technique and Scottish country and Highland dance movements. In 1951, the Celtic Ballet had a season at the Theatre Royal, Glasgow. In 1954, the Celtic Ballet toured the United States and performed at Ted Shawn's Jacob's Pillow dance festival. Between 1958 and 1959 the Celtic Ballet performed at festivals in Russia, Austria and Czechoslovakia. In 1960 she formed the Scottish National ballet and appeared at the Festival Theatre, Pitlochry. The Celtic Ballet College in Glasgow was based on modern ballet not classical. The last tour she did with Scottish National Ballet performed in Glasgow (The Alhambra), Edinburgh, Aberdeen, Carlisle and Sunderland. As well as training for theatre dance she also trained pupils to be dance therapists. She used to go every Friday to the Southern General Hospital in Glasgow and her training was based on people with mental and physical health problems.

== Notation ==
Morris devised a method of dance notation intended for the documentation of all kinds of human movement. It was first published in The Notation of Human Movement (1928), the same year as the Laban system. Initially Morris was inspired by the shorthand system devised by Raymond Duncan but realised the limitations of such an approach for comprehensive documentation. The system she later referred to as 'Danscript' was comprehensive and was intended for the universal documentation of human movement. It featured in Choreo-graphics (1989) and was referenced in The Dancing Times.

== Art work ==
Morris began to paint from an early age. Her father was the artist William Bright Morris. The Third Eye Centre recognized her work in both dance and art with the exhibition catalog Margaret Morris: Drawings and Designs and the Glasgow Years. In 1984 an exhibition of her work was held in Glasgow at the Cyril Gerber Fine Art Gallery. The exhibition Color, Rhythm and Dance was shown in Scotland and in France in 1985. In 1991, a centenary exhibition of her drawings and paintings was held at the Cyril Gerber Gallery. The Fergusson Gallery in Perth features artefacts from all aspects of her career, including original costumes, costume designs, drawings from her childhood and adult career, paintings and sketchbooks. Morris also designed the cover art for The March of the Women, the anthem of the Women's Social and Political Union written by Ethel Smyth c1910.

== Personal life ==
Morris's personal life was colourful; she was bohemian in spirit. She had an affair with the writer John Galsworthy as a young woman whilst he was still married to Ada Galsworthy, and her long-term partnership with the Scottish artist John Duncan Fergusson did not rule out other liaisons. She met Fergusson in Paris in 1913 and they became life partners but never married. He was an important influence on her work.

He introduced her to the Paris art world and with her in 1915 founded the Margaret Morris Club in Chelsea, which quickly became the focus for the remnants of the pre-war avant garde in London. Members included Augustus John, Jacob Epstein, Katherine Mansfield, Ezra Pound, Siegfried Sassoon, Wyndham Lewis and Charles Rennie Mackintosh among others. Some members of this group, after the war, were involved in organising a Labour Party connected collective known as the 'Arts League of Service' which aimed to bring the arts into everyday life.

== Later years and legacy ==
In 1961, after the death of J. D. Fergusson, the Glasgow School was closed. In 1972, at the age of 81, Morris was asked to train the dancers in the hit musical Hair at the Metropole Theatre, Glasgow. In 1973 the 'Margaret Morris Movement' film was made by the Scottish Arts Council. Margaret Morris died in Glasgow on 29 February 1980, aged 89.

The archive of Morris and Fergusson is held by Culture Perth and Kinross. Some works were previously on display in a dedicated Fergusson Gallery, but they were moved in 2024 to Perth Art Gallery where there is a permanent Fergus and Meg exhibition.

In 2019, University of Edinburgh Library hosted a Wellcome Trust funded archive exhibition, Body Language, which explored Morris' legacy as a choreographer and dance teacher, along with the archives of Dunfermline College of Physical Education and Scottish Gymnastics.

In 2025, blue plaques to commemorate Morris and Ferguson were erected at 4 Clouston Street, Glasgow where the couple lived from 1939 until their deaths.

== Choreographed works ==
- "Anitra's Dance" (1909) music by Grieg

A dance originally performed by Morris at her first solo recital in Hampstead.

- The Forsaken Mermaid, music by Erik Chisholm (1940)

The subject of this ballet is the old fairy-tale about a fisherman who falls in love with a mermaid, deserts her and is finally reunited to her at the bottom of the sea. It is the tale of Rimsky-Korsakov's fantasy work Sadko.

- The Earth Shapers, music by Erik Chisholm (1941)
- The Hoodie Craw, music by Erik Chisholm (1948)

== Writings ==
- Margaret Morris dancing (1925)
- The Notation of Movement (1928)
- Breathing Exercises (1935)
- Maternity and Post-Operative Exercises (1936)
- Basic Physical Training (1937)
- My Galsworthy Story (1967)
- My Life in Movement (1969) ISBN 0-7206-5208-1
- Creation in Dance and Life (1972)
- The Art of J D Fergusson (1974)

== Films ==
- Dance of the Moods (1924) filmed by Claude Friese-Greene in early colour film process Bioscope
- Margaret Morris Movement (1973) film by Scottish Arts Council
