= John Duncan Fergusson =

Scottish artist and sculptor (1874–1961)

- Self-portrait by John Duncan Fergusson, c. 1902, oil on canvas, 50.80 x 56.40 cm, Perth Art Gallery, in Perth, Scotland
- Born: 9 March 1874; Leith, Scotland
- Died: 30 January 1961 (aged 86); Glasgow, Scotland
- Known for: painting
- Movement: Scottish Colourists
- Partner: Margaret Morris

John Duncan Fergusson (9 March 1874 – 30 January 1961) was a Scottish artist and sculptor, regarded as one of the major artists of the Scottish Colourists school of painting.

== Early life ==
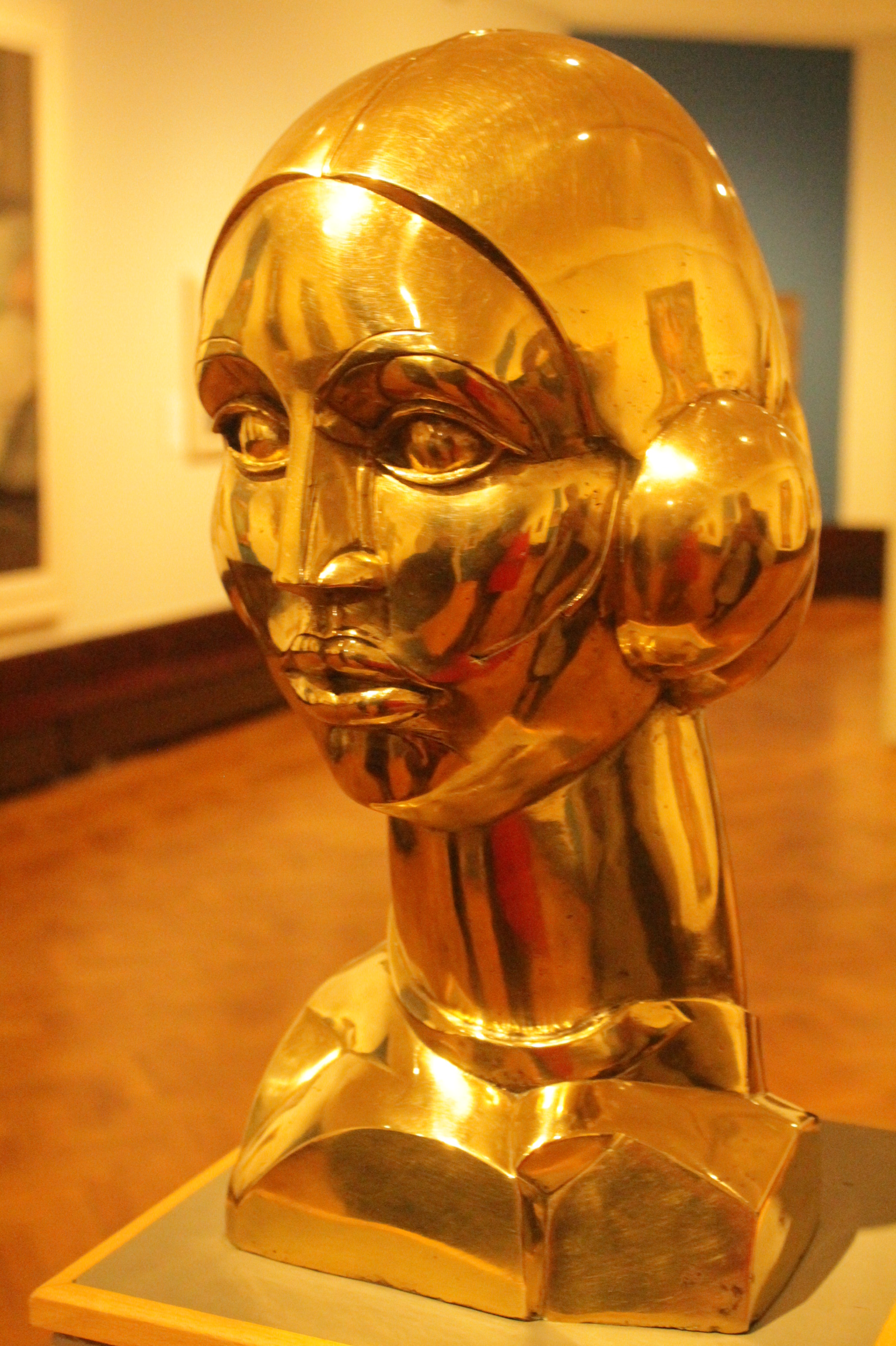
Eastre, Hymn to the Sun by J D Fergusson, 1924, Perth Art Gallery

Fergusson was born in Leith, Edinburgh, the first of four children. Although he briefly trained as a naval surgeon, Fergusson soon realised that his vocation was painting and he enrolled at the Trustees Academy, an Edinburgh-based art school. He rapidly became disenchanted with the rigid teaching style, however, and elected to teach himself to paint. To this end, he began to travel to Morocco, Spain and France, where he became acquainted with other artists of the day. Amongst them was Samuel Peploe, another of the group of artists who would later become identified as the Scottish Colourists.

== Painting career ==
=== Paris ===
In 1898, Fergusson took his first trip to Paris to study at the Louvre. He was highly influenced by the impressionist paintings at the Salle Caillebotte and these were an important influence on his developing style. Later he would also be influenced by Fauvism and the fauvist principles of using colour would become a strong feature of his art. Andre Dunoyer de Segonzac wrote in his foreword to Fergusson's memorial exhibition of 1961: "His art is a deep and pure expression of his immense love of life. Endowed with a rare plastic feeling, almost sculptural in its quality. He joined with it an exceptional sense of colour, outspoken, ringing colours, rich and splendid in their very substance."

Fergusson became part of the enormous growth in artistic talent that Paris was home to at the beginning of the twentieth century. There he mingled with artists like Matisse and Picasso in the café society for which the city was renowned. In addition, he and his friend Samuel Peploe regularly painted together at Paris Plage (Le Touquet) and other places along the coast between 1904–9. It was at this period too that he began his relationship with the American illustrator Anne Estelle Rice (1879–1959), whom he encouraged to take up painting. She had been sent to Paris to provide drawings for articles on theatre, ballet, opera and race meetings published in the North American magazine and was to figure in many of Fergusson's canvases.

He had his first one-man-show in the Baillie Gallery in London, immediately before going to Paris. He did have his second show until 1923.

=== Post WWI career ===
By the outbreak of World War I, Fergusson was considered to be at the forefront of modern British painting. During the war years, however, he achieved little artistically and it was only towards the end of the war that he regained the momentum in his work.

In the 1920s Fergusson settled in a studio in London. His first solo exhibition was organised by Alexander Reid in September 1923 at La Societe des Beaux Artes in Glasgow, reshown at Aitken & Dott's Gallery in Edinburgh (also through Reid) in October 1923. Reid also organised a four man exhibition including Fergusson at the Galerie Barbazanges in Paris in February 1924. In 1928 he and his partner, the dancer Margaret Morris, moved to Paris, where they lived until the spectre of war once again loomed over Europe, prompting the couple to move to Glasgow in 1939 where they were to remain for the rest of their lives. A member of Glasgow Art Club, Fergusson exhibited a portrait in the club's exhibition, April 1939.

In 1940 Fergusson founded the New Art Club, out of which emerged the New Scottish Group of painters of which he was the first president. In 1943 he published his book on "Modern Scottish Painting".

People and Sails at Royan, 1910

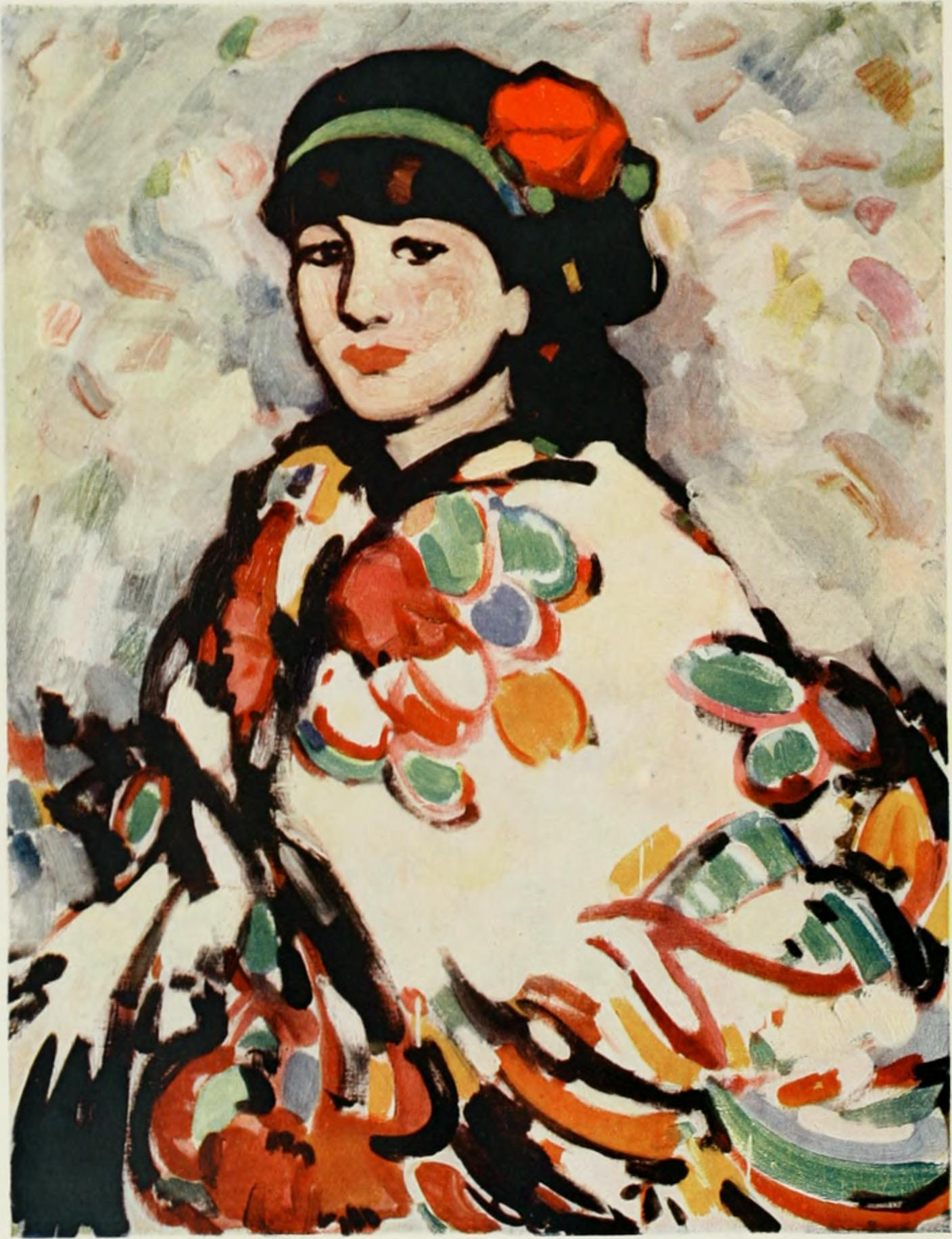
The new spirit in drama and art, 1912

== Death and legacy ==
Fergusson died on 30 January 1961. His partner Margaret Morris presented fourteen of his paintings to the University of Stirling when it was founded in 1968. His work remains popular and in 1992 a permanent gallery, The Fergusson Gallery, was founded in Perth to house it. In 2022, the Fergusson Gallery was closed permanently and the collection moved to a dedicated section in Perth Art Gallery. The collection comprises oil paintings, sculptures, sketchbooks, letters, photographs and personal items related to Fergusson and Morris.

In 2025, blue plaques to commemorate Morris and Ferguson were erected at 4 Clouston Street, Glasgow where the couple lived from 1939 until their deaths.
