= Alexander Reid (art dealer) =

Scottish art dealer (1854–1928)

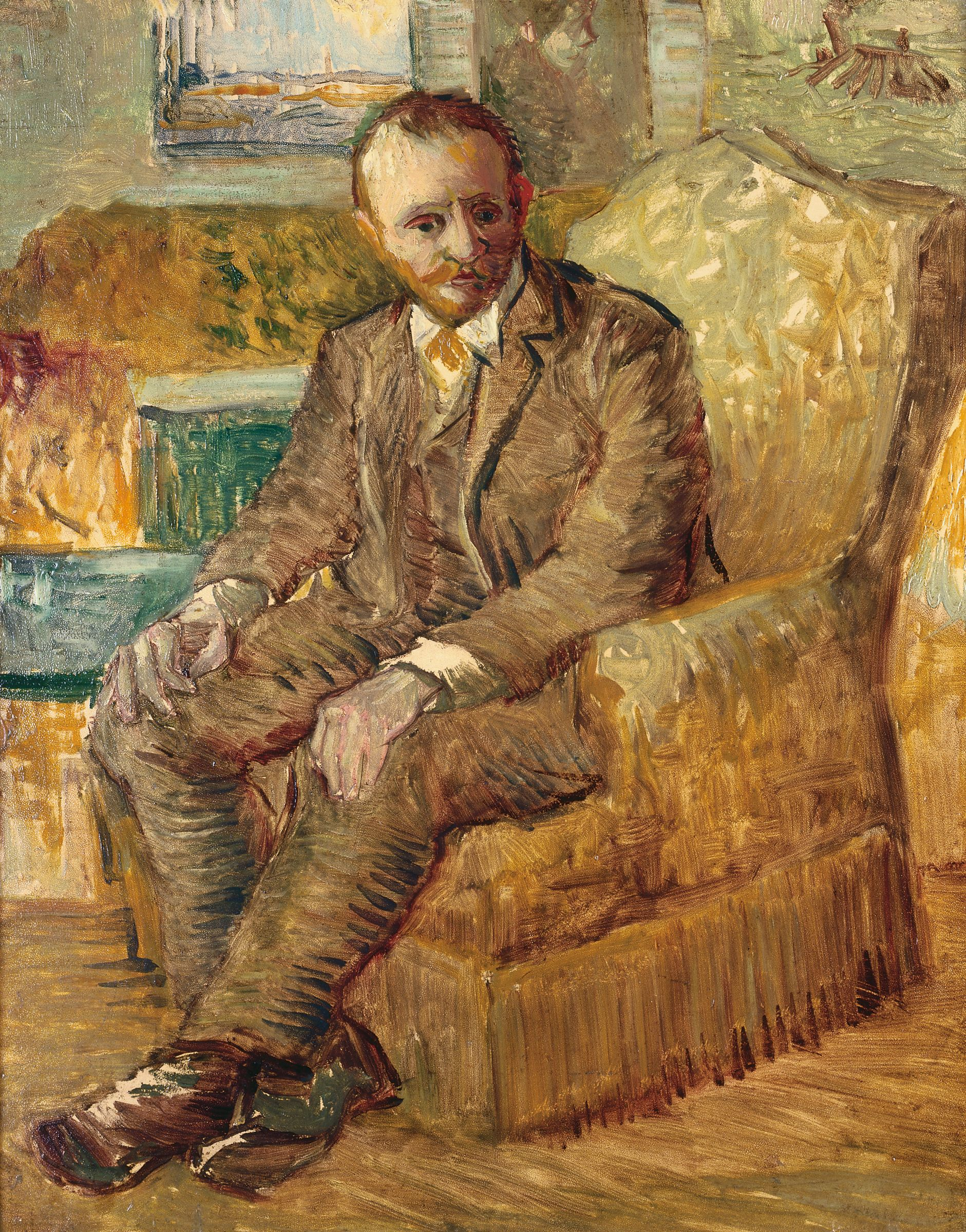
Van Gogh's portrait of Alex Reid, c. 1887

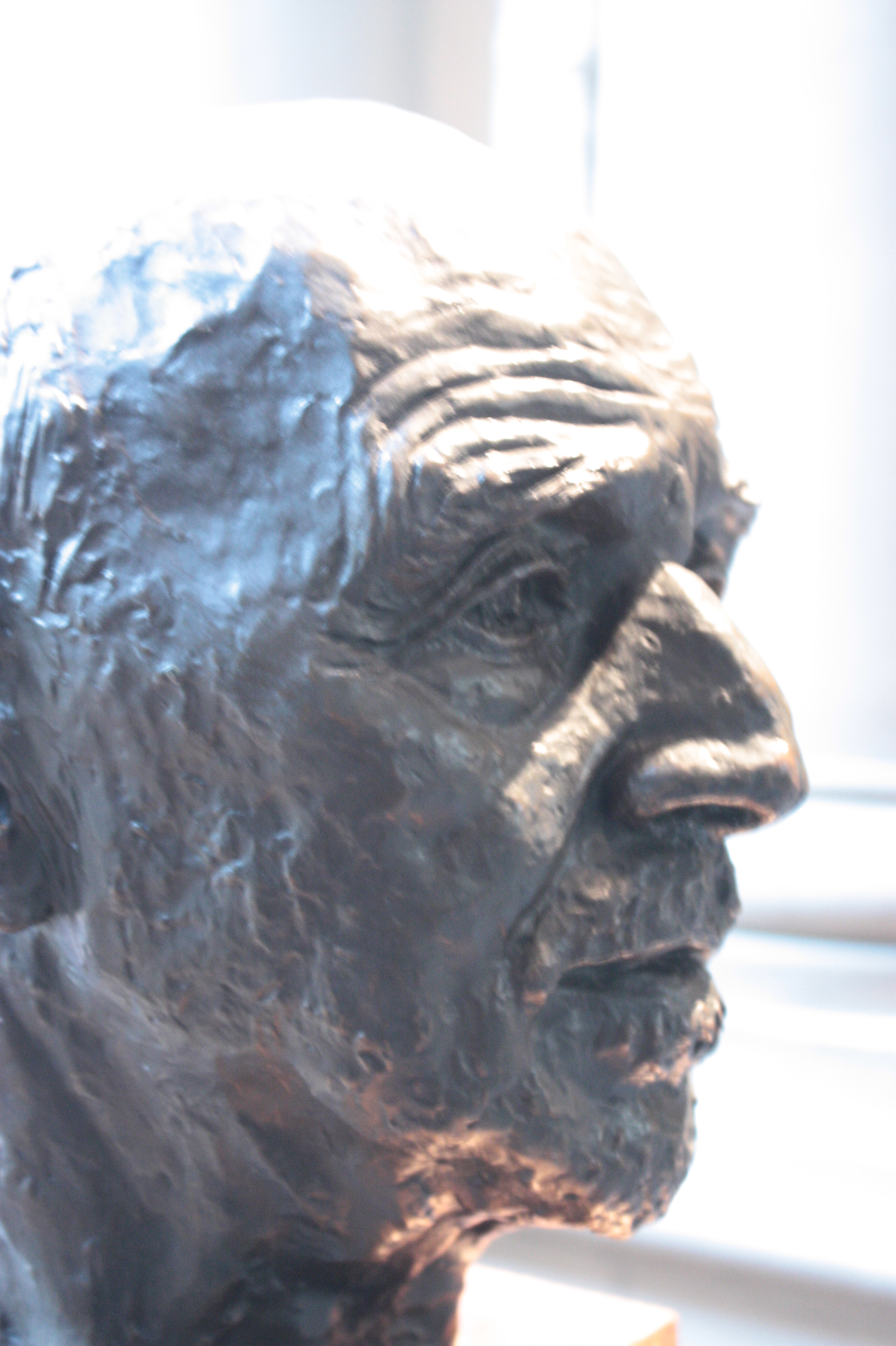
Alexander Reid by Benno Schotz 1927

The Princess from the Land of Porcelain

Alexander Reid (1854–1928) was a Glasgow art dealer and amateur artist, and friend of James Abbott McNeill Whistler and Vincent van Gogh. He was one of the most influential art dealers in Europe in the early 20th century, exhibiting and selling artworks by some of the finest artists of his period, including the Impressionists, the Post-Impressionists, the Glasgow Boys and the Scottish Colourists. He helped build up the French painting collection of Sir William Burrell, and many of the works he dealt with now feature in major private, civic and national art collections all over the world. Within the Scottish art world he was called Monticelli Reid.

During this period dealers bought art at risk, becoming the temporary owner. They then reinvested the profit in more art, usually increasing the investment progressively, but also increasing the personal risk if the art did not sell or sold for less than the price paid.

== Life ==
He was born in Glasgow on 25 March 1854 the first of six children of James Gardner Reid (1828-1907) a cabinet maker and ship carver (specialising in figureheads) with premises at 47 Carrick Street, living at 10 Minerva Place in the Finnieston district. His mother Elizabeth Turnbull was the daughter of William Turnbull, a minor artist and pottery designer. In 1857 his father went into partnership with a Thomas Kay to create the carving firm of "Kay & Reid" based at 50 Wellington Street. The company made figureheads and ornate picture frames.

Alexander was educated at Glasgow High School. By 1869 Alexander had left school and the family was living at 134 Blythswood Terrace. He helped out at his father's firm which by 1877 had a workforce of eighty men. From 1872 the business had begun selling framed prints, linking to their previous business in picture frames, and this aspect began to dominate. In 1877 they started dealing in framed original art works, and in this move the art dealer was born, opening an art gallery at 103 St. Vincent Street in central Glasgow.

In 1882, Kay & Reid's premises were wholly destroyed in a fire and, being uninsured, James Reid was ruined, but Alexander strived to keep the gallery side of the business afloat. In particular he began a business relationship with Mary Bacon Martin in promoting American artists such as James Whistler.

In 1886 he went to Paris to study the French style of art dealing and toed and froed to there until 1889. In particular he studied at the gallery of Boussod & Valadon on Boulevard Montparnasse in Paris, working there for 18 months under the guidance of their employee Theo van Gogh, who managed their modern art section. Through this link he met Vincent van Gogh. In October or November 1886 this resulted in all three men deciding to live together at 54 Rue Lepic. Reid moved out in spring 1887 on good terms, simply to have a place of his own, at 6 Place d'Anvers. In 1887 Vincent introduced him to other artists, including Toulouse-Lautrec and France-based Australian John Peter Russell.

In 1887 Reid began bringing Japanese prints back to his Glasgow gallery. In the same year he befriended Adolphe Monticelli and began to promote his work in the Paris gallery. In January 1888 he organised the first British exhibition of Monticelli's work: at the Dowdeswell gallery in London.

Vincent executed two portraits of Reid in 1888 plus Reid infamously gave him money to buy a bowl of apples as model for a still life which Vincent later presented to Reid. Vincent and Reid fell out in 1889 owing to Reid being unable to promote his work (or other modern work) in Scotland (blaming this on his father James Reid's inability to back the scheme). Vincent also disliked Reid's merchant spirit dominating his artistic spirit. Whilst Reid's father played a role it was Alexander's own unwillingness to invest in Post-Impressionist Art at this stage which delayed his decision.

Reid left Boussod & Valadon at some point in 1888 but stayed in Paris as a "marchand en chambre" selling from his own apartment at 6 Place d'Anvers and amassed a large number of paintings by Monticelli. Reid did much to promote the love of Monticelli in Britain. This trade led him to meet Ferdinand Viola, who (with his two sons) were creating fake Monticellis.

Returning to Glasgow in 1889 with both experience and a collection of art he set up a gallery at 227 West George Street under the name of A. & D. Reid and was living at 32 Minerva Street close to his early childhood home. In November 1889 he organised an exhibition of "Japanese art" by Hokusai (but actually by Edward Arthur Walton) and this coincided with the Glasgow Art School's Fancy Dress Ball at which Walton appeared dressed as Hokusai and revealed his identity and also announced his engagement to Helen Law.

In December 1891 he organised an important exhibition of Impressionist work (Sisley, Monet, Pissarro, and Monticelli) at Arthur Collie's rooms at 39b Old Bond Street in London.

In 1892 Beatrice Whistler convinced Reid to buy The Princess from the Land of Porcelain from her husband at a price of 420 guineas originally suggesting he sell it to Potter Palmer for £2000. However, Reid fell in love with the picture and kept it in Glasgow. He had also bought Whistler's The Fur Jacket for £400.

On his own admission he began trading sculpture rather late in his career: notably purchasing works by Auguste Rodin from 1892 direct from Rodin, usually priced from 1200 to 1400 francs for small bronze works. He also acquired works indirectly: buying a bronze of the Burghers of Calais from D. C. Thomson for £84. In 1922 he acquired a version of The Thinker from a dealer named Danken.

In 1893, Reid sold Whistler's The Yellow Buskin to J. G. Johnson for the Wilstach Collection for $6000 rather than the $15000 asked. Reid had bought it from Whistler for £600 after much haggling. The same sale tried and failed to sell The Princess from the Land of Porcelain and The Fur Jacket, but both failed to meet the reserve of $15000. Both were then passed to William Burrell at a slight discount.

In the 1890s, Reid grew closer to the Glasgow Boys giving both encouragement, sponsorship and selling their work in his gallery. He was very close to Joseph Crawhall III, E. A. Hornell and George Henry and in 1893 funded Hornell and Henry to take a trip to Japan to expand their style. He also began promoting the young David Gauld giving him his first one-man-show in February 1896.

In April 1894 he moved to a larger gallery at 124 St. Vincent Street, Glasgow, opening with Joseph Crawhall III's first one-man show. In relation to this Reid through a dinner party on 13 April, mainly of artists (Crawhall, Hornell, Guthrie, Lavery, Henry, Kennedy and Macaulay Stevenson, but critically inviting a potential sponsor in the form of William Burrell.

In 1895 he began renting "Woodvale", a large villa in Dunoon west of Glasgow. He bought it in 1896. He commuted from Dunoon to Glasgow using a Clyde steamer.

From 1896 he began to take more interest in promoting the Scottish Colourists and sold the first Samuel Peploe to the United States: to the Albright Gallery in Buffalo, New York.

In 1898 Reid's finances got out of balance, having bought to many works which he could not sell at a profit in Scotland. He returned to Paris with 63 paintings which were auctioned at Hotel Drouot on 10 June the sale realising 62,200 francs in total, but temporarily rescuing Reid. Reid used the funds to purchase more saleable works by Monet and Manet which were returned to Glasgow for sale in December 1898. However, his father's ill-health meant that he could not support the whole family and two spinster sisters, Mary and Helen, moved into "Woodvale" to reduce overall family expenditure.

From 1900 to 1914 Reid became far more cautious in his approach to buying, to try and limit any losses. He then concentrated on both recently deceased artists such as Eugène Boudin and Henri Fantin-Latour and long deceased portraiture by established names such as Henry Raeburn, Joshua Reynolds and George Romney. The exception was the female (living) artist Susan Fletcher Crawford. Trying to keep up appearances, Reid was one of the first Glaswegians to purchase a motor vehicle: an 8 hp De Dion. Soon after purchase he overturned the vehicle, breaking his ribs. In 1908, continuing on the dead artists concept, he did exhibitions of Albert Joseph Moore and Edward Burne-Jones. He added one more live artist into the mix in 1913: Lucien Simon.

Reid's Glasgow-based art gallery, La Société des Beaux-Arts, was located at 117 West George St, from 1904 until 1932, continuing for four years after his death in the magnificent Sun Life Insurance Building designed by William Leiper. After 82 years Reid's former gallery reopened in 2014 as Leiper Fine Art.

In 1909/10 he took an extended six month holiday in Canada, Japan and Ceylon, leaving Ada and his son with his in-laws in Vancouver for part of the time. On his return he lost interest in 19th century portraits and renewed his interest in Monticelli organising an exhibition of both Monticelli and Matthijs Maris. After a break of at least 12 years he returned to selling Impressionist work in 1911, the public being now open to its concept: to this end he sold Pissarro's Les Jardins des Tuileries to Sir John Richmonf for £120, plus a Manet portrait of a woman to J. Reid Wilson of Canada for £600.

In December 1911 he organised an exhibition of 30 works by James Lawton Wingate and a similar number by William McTaggart in the same display. In 1912 he had his fourth and fifth exhibitions of the work of Eugène Boudin. His constant client, William Burrell bought to pictures by Degas in 1917 (now in the Burrell Collection). In November 1913 Reid had a one-man-show for George Leslie Hunter.

From 1913, rather than his previous position of rivalry, he went into a joint deal with Aitken & Dott in Edinburgh for the sale of works by William McTaggart and Horatio McCulloch. In 1920 they extended this arrangement to also cover works by Walton and Peploe. In 1924 they extended it to cover most modern Scottish artists.

In 1915/16 Reid moved focus to David Gauld and Samuel Peploe hosting Peploe's first one-man show in December 1915. In 1916 McNeill Reid left the business to join the Transport Corps in Flanders. Reid went into partnership with John Tattersall of Dundee. In 1917 he began exhibiting the works of Francis Cadell holding his first one-man show in February 1918. McNeill Reid rejoined the business in January 1919, after the war ended, allowing Alexander to take his first trip to Paris in some years, where he bought a number of paintings by Édouard Vuillard which he exhibited in Glasgow in May 1919.

In January 1920 he exhibited 70 French works including: Vollon, Bonvin, Ribot, Corot, Hervier, Boudin, Lucien Simon, and masterpieces by Monet, Degas, Pissarro, Sisley, Renoir, Guillaumin and Vuillard. In June 1921 he exhibited Dutch Impressionism by Jongkind.

From 1921 he began more collaborative projects (spreading the risk) including Aitken & Dott in Edinburgh. In 1922 he met Etienne Bignou of the Lefevre Gallery and they organised some combined projects. In October 1923 he organised an exhibition at the Lefevre Gallery in London with works by Toulouse-Lautrec, Van Gogh, Gauguin and Renoir: one of the most important exhibitions in Britain. In January 1923 he exhibited Cadell and Hunter with Albert Marquet at the Leicester Gallery in London (with all three present). In September 1923 he exhibited John Duncan Fergusson in Glasgow. In February 1924 he united Peploe, Cadell, Hunter and Fergusson in an exhibition at Galerie Barbazanges in Paris.

In June 1924, he exhibited a series of woodcuts by Gauguin (his Noa-Noa series) all of which were purchased by Samuel Courtauld. Later that year in Glasgow he allowed McNeill Reid to exhibit an important collection of works by the new wave of French artists: Matisse, Dufy, Dufresne, Dunoyer de Segonzac, Rouault, Vlaminck and Braque. Reid retired in 1925 aged 71 and passed all responsibility to McNeill. He left Glasgow and went to live in Letter Cottage in Killearn (the dower house of the Edmonstone Estate).

Alexander died in January 1928.

In 1928, McNeill joined forces with Ernest Lefevre to open the Lefevre Gallery in London.

In 1937, McNeill bought Rodin's The Age of Bronze which he sold to William Burrell and which now stands in the Burrell Collection.

== Family ==
In March 1892, at the Registrar's Office in Glasgow, he married Harriet Elizabeth Adriana ("Ada") Stevenson of Birdston near Kirkintilloch, whom he had met through the Scottish artist Alexander Ignatius Roche. Ada's younger sister, Louisa Stevenson (1872-1939), was a model much used and admired by the Glasgow Boys and called "Miss Loo" by the group. The witnesses to the wedding were the Scottish artists James Guthrie and William Meldrum, and the Glasgow shipowner James Garroway. They honeymooned at the artists colony at Grez-sur-Loing, staying in the Hotel Chevillon. During the same trip they visited James Whistler and his wife Beatrice, in Paris.

They had a son Alexander James McNeill Reid (b.1893). The name "McNeill" appears to be a homage to his artist friend James McNeill Whistler. McNeill Reid joined the dealership in 1913.

Ada died of peritonitis on 6 May 1915 and was buried in the churchyard of Holy Trinity Episcopal Church on Kilbride Road in Dunoon. Reid was devastated by her death and left Dunoon to live with his sister Helen at 3 Carlton Gardens.

In December 1915 Reid became engaged to Ada's first cousin: Eva Gray. They married in February 1916. They lived with Helen Reid at Carlton Gardens until 1919 then bought a five-storey, end-terraced townhouse at 42 Westbourne Gardens in the Kelvinside district.

== Bibliography ==
- Chilvers, Ian (2004). "Burrell, Sir William". The Oxford Dictionary of Art (3rd ed.). Oxford: Oxford University Press Inc. pp. 115–116. ISBN 0-19-860476-9. "His interests were extremely diverse, but his collection became particularly strong in medieval art and in 19th-century French painting (some of his finest pictures were bought from the Glasgow dealer Alex Reid (1854–1928), who helped to pioneer interest in this field in Scotland)."
- Fowle, Frances (1993). Alexander Reid in Context: Collecting and Dealing in Scotland in the late 19th and early 20th Centuries (Ph.D.). Edinburgh: University of Edinburgh. OCLC 1403242419.
