= Alf Webster =

Scottish stained glass artist

Alfred Alexander Webster (1883–1915) was a Scottish stained glass artist in the early twentieth century. His talent established him as the successor to the Glasgow stained glass designer Stephen Adam who in turn considered Daniel Cottier to be his master. Webster was considered one of the most accomplished artists working in stained-glass during this period. Websters Theatre, Glasgow on 416 Great Western Road, Glasgow is named after Webster as the building contains two major stained glass windows (The Templeton window and the McCowan window) designed by him.

== Early life and studies ==
Webster was born at 40 Keir Street in Pollokshields in Glasgow’s South Side on 19 December 1883. He was the second son of George Webster (1842 -1910) and Ann Jane McCall. Webster had an elder brother, George, and two younger brothers called Gordon and Edward. At the age of 14 Webster completed his schooling before becoming a shipbroker’s clerk, probably employed at George Webster & Co., their father’s firm located at Waterloo Chambers, 19 Waterloo Street. When he was employed as a shipbroker’s clerk Webster met and married Maude Caroline Murdoch Cochrane (1883-1959). Both Webster and Maude were eighteen years old when they married in June 1901. After his marriage to Maude, Webster changed his career turning his focus to the study of Architecture. In 1903 he registered for evening classes at the Glasgow School of Art. In his first year at Glasgow School of Art Webster studied Architecture and Modelling under David G Miller and Walter Robert Watson. Architectural Historian Gordon Urquhart notes that it is difficult to know exactly how Webster’s artistic output was shaped by his time at GSA but Urquhart argues that Webster’s biggest stylistic influence came during his time studying and working under Stephen Adam (1848–1910).

== Career ==
Webster’s style is very distinctive. Urquhart notes that it is difficult to note when Webster began to ‘find his own particular voice’ but it is clear that Webster’s style matured during his time at the Stephen Adam studio quickly becoming one of Scotland most proficient and innovative stained-glass artists. His style is heavily designed with colour, shape and texture at the forefront of the design. He used pioneering techniques such as acid etching and the use of thick Norman slab glass which at the time was popularised by the leading English artist Christopher Whall (1849-1924). Websters later work is heavily laden with symbolism. With the outbreak of war in Europe in August 1914 Webster was a highly successful stained-glass artist with several commissions from a variety of churches throughout Scotland. Commissions for stained glass windows in 1914 included churches in Orkney, St Andrews and the completion and installation of the McCowan window at Landsdowne church (now Websters’ Bar & Theatre).

=== The Templeton window ===
The Templeton window in the north transept of Lansdowne church installed in 1913. It was a gift of the Misses Templeton, the daughters of James Templeton. James Templeton was one of Lansdowne UP church’s long-time Managers and Elders. The window depicts scenes from the life of Christ including the Resurrection and the Nativity. The window is currently not available to view by the public.

=== The McCowan window ===
The McCowan window is the south transept window which was installed in Lansdowne Church in 1913. The window was a gift of Mr and Mrs David McCowan of 9 Park Circus, Glasgow. McCowan was a senior partner of the celebrated firm of Messrs William Euing & Company, marine insurance brokers and underwriters. The McCowans were well known philanthropists in Glasgow. The window depicts six scenes of events during Holy Week. The window is currently not available to view by the public.

== Personal life ==
In 1910 Webster, Maude and their family were living in a house called Woodside in Uplawmoor before moving into Stephen Adam’s former home at 168 Bath Street, Glasgow. By 1915 Webster and Maude had three young children Martyn, Gordon McWhirter and Alfred Edward Comyn. From 1911 Webster appears to have run the Stephen Adam Studio and quickly achieved a reputation in the art world.

In 1915 Webster volunteered to fight for his country passing his medical and physical mandatory examinations at the Maryhill Barracks on 26 February 1915. Webster was deemed fit for service and joined the 3rd Battalion of the Royal Gordon Highlanders. He was recommended by the Battalion’s Commanding Officer for the post of 2nd Lieutenant. By 17 March 1915 he had received his commission as a probationary 2nd Lieutenant in the 3rd (Reserve) Battalion of the Gordon Highlanders and was based in the Aberdeen city garrison. The 1st Battalion of the Gordons, with Webster, were shipped to the front lines in May 1915. Urquhart notes that Websters movements during the war are difficult to trace but that the 1st Battalion were stationed near Ouderdom southwest of Ypres. Webster, along with several other men, were injured during a period of shelling between 13 and 17 August. Webster died from his injuries in Etaples on 24 August 1915. After Websters death his wife, Maude Webster, continued to operate the stained glass firm under its original title of the Stephen Adam Studio. Maude placed the practical management of the glass shop in the hands of the firm’s former apprentice and assistant Douglas Hamilton (1895 -1959). Hamilton completed several of Webster’s commissions after his mentor’s death.

=== List of windows ===
- 1910 St Michael’s and South Church, Dumfries
- 1910 James Young Memorial Window, New Kilpatrick Church
- 1910 Janet Bulloch Young Memorial Window, New Kilpatrick Church
- 1910 First Fruits, New Kilpatrick Church
- 1910 Master of Waves, New Kilpatrick Church
- 1911 Tree of Life New Kilpatrick Parish Church
- 1911 St. David’s Ramshorn Kirk
- 1911 Lecropt Church, Dunblane
- 1911 Gartmore Parish Church
- 1912 The Woman Called Blessed, New Kilpatrick Church
- 1912 Cathcart South (Now trinity Church on Clarkston Rd)
- 1912 Kilmun Parish Church (now in storage)
- 1912 New St. Andrews Parish Church (formerly Gartsherrie Parish Church), Coatbridge
- 1913 Templeton Memorial Window & McCowan Memorial window, Lansdowne Church
- 1913 Shettleston Old Parish Church
- 1913 St Andrews & St. George, Edinburgh (formerly St. Andrews)
- 1913 Glendevon Parish Church, Perth & Kinross
- 1914 Marion Bell Memorial Window & Rev. James Watt Memorial Window, Cadder Parish Church
- 1914 Prayer & Praise, New Kilpatrick Church
- 1914 St. Anne, Edinburgh
- 1914 Adam & Christ, Dunlop Parish Church, East Ayrshire
- Unknown The Ascension of Christ, Fairlie Parish Church, Ayrshire
- Unknown Twynholm Parish Church, Kirkcudbrightshire
- 1914 St Michaels Linlithgow.
