= William Shirreffs =

Scottish sculptor

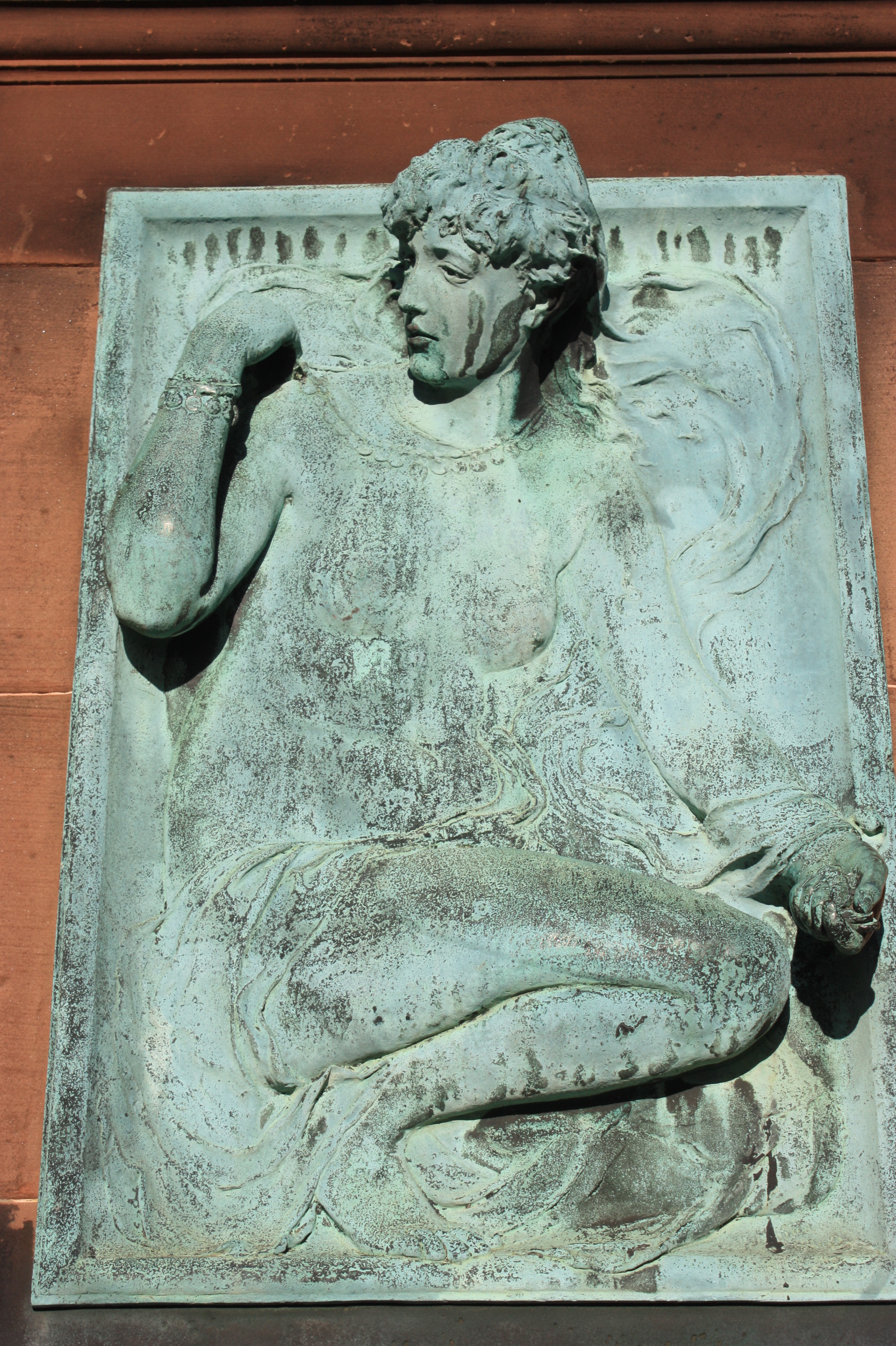
Panel by William Shirrefs, Chambers Memorial, Edinburgh

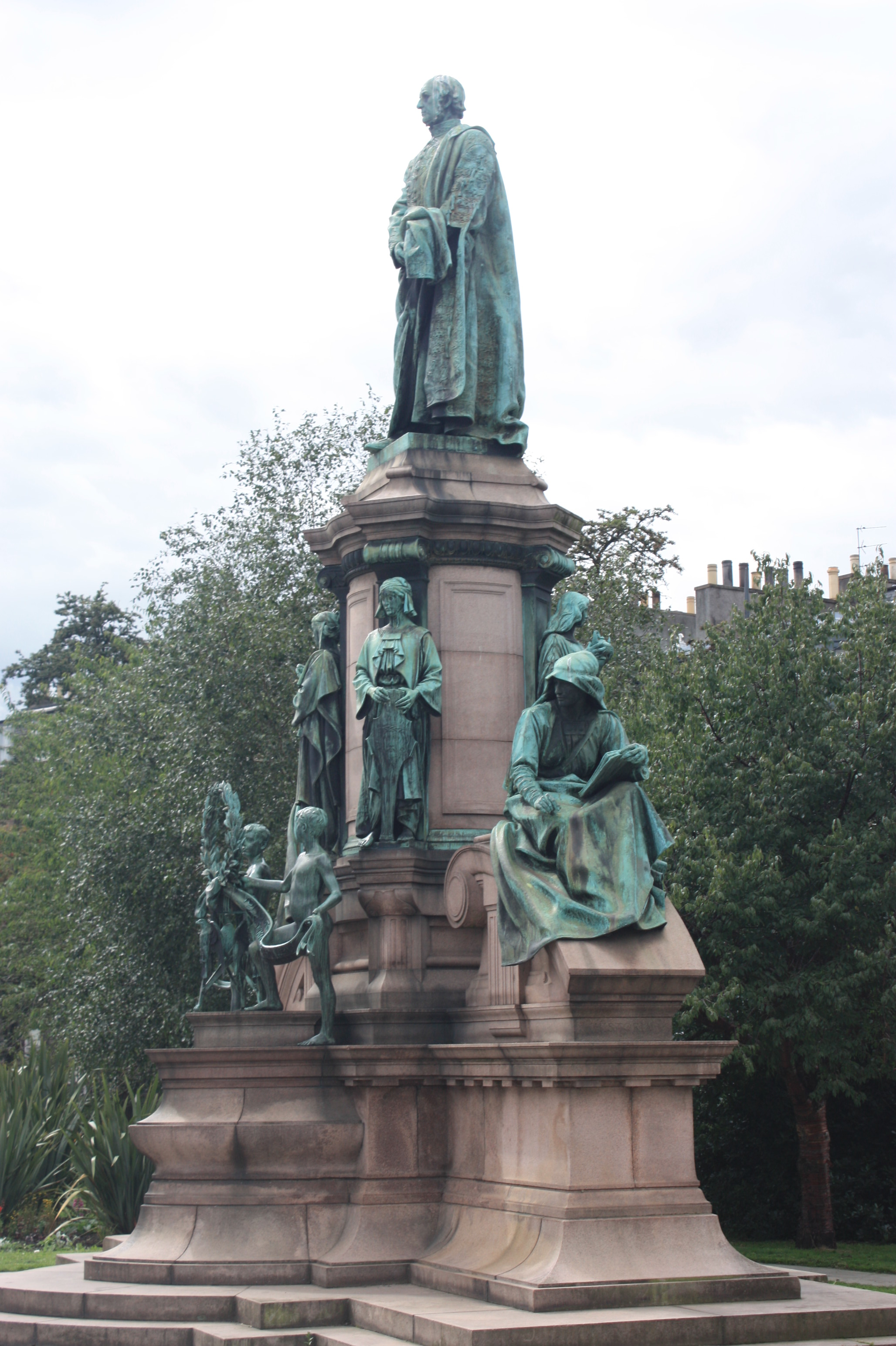
Gladstone Memorial, Edinburgh - lower figures by Shirreffs

William Shirreffs (1846 – 23 June 1902) was a Scottish sculptor in the 19th century.

He served as one of the chosen sculptors of the figures depicting characters from the novels of Sir Walter Scott on the Scott Monument on Princes Street in Edinburgh and was the sculptor of the figures on the north entrance porch of Kelvingrove Art Gallery and Museum.

== Life ==
He was born in Huntly, Aberdeenshire, to James Shirreffs and his wife, Mary Wagrel, in 1846 and was baptised in the same parish on 14 April 1846.

He studied at Glasgow School of Art under William Mossman from 1870 to 1873, winning a free scholarship in 1872.

In 1877 he opened his own studio at 108 West Regent Street and in 1887 opened his own foundry at 261 West George Street, probably with his brother, Charles Gordon Shirreffs (1857-1913), who was a brass-founder.

He worked closely with the architect J J Burnet on several projects. He also did co-operative works with other sculptors such as Sir George Frampton, John Rhind and Pittendreigh MacGillivray.

He exhibited at the Royal Academy in London in 1896.

For the Kelvingrove Art Gallery, he visited Paris with Frampton to study sculptures on contemporary French buildings.

He died at his home, Lochwinnoch in Paisley on 23 June 1902 and is buried in Glasgow's Western Necropolis.

== Principal Public Works ==
See

- Figure of Gurth the Swineherd on the Scott Monument, Princes Street, Edinburgh (1882)
- Copper panels in Glasgow's City Chambers (1888)
- Carving on the Sugar Exchange, Greenock (1890)
- Low relief bronze panels on the pedestal of John Rhind’s statue to Sir William Chambers on Chambers Street, Edinburgh (1891)
- Carving on the General Accident and Assurance Company offices, Perth (1891)
- Carving on Clark Memorial Church, Largs (1892)
- Sculpture on Glasgow Savings Bank, 177 Ingram Street (1894-1899)
- Monument to Thomas Gildard, architect, Glasgow Necropolis (1896)
- Heraldic sculpture, 67 St Vincent Street, Glasgow (1898) demolished 1967
- Figure of Diana Vernon in final phase of Scott Monument, Princes Street, Edinburgh (1898)
- Figures on the north side of Kelvingrove Art Gallery and Museum (1898-1900)
- Lower figures on the monument to William Gladstone on Coates Crescent, Edinburgh (1900-1902) - main statue by Pittendreigh MacGillivray
- William Barbour Monument, Paisley (1902)

== Portrait Busts ==
- James Gardner Laing RSW, artist (1894)
- Robert Phillips (1896)
- John L Toole, actor (1896)
- David Gauld, artist (1896)

== References and External links ==
- http://www.glasgowsculpture.com/pg_biography.php?sub=shirreffs_w
- http://sculpture.gla.ac.uk/view/person.php?id=msib6_1232383806
