= A. E. Pickard =

20th-century British showman and entrepreneur

Albert Ernest Pickard (1874–1964) was a showman, publicist and eccentric who became a millionaire and philanthropist.

The diminutive A.E.Pickard was born in Bradford, England, in 1874. Turning away from a printing apprenticeship he became a wandering showman in Yorkshire, France and London. In 1904 he settled in Glasgow where he took over Fell's American Museum and Waxworks at 101 Trongate when Mr Fell retired. In 1906 he took up a lease of the Britannia Music Hall renaming it as Britannia Panopticon at 115 Trongate, buying the entire building in 1915 from the Archibald Blair Trust. He introduced cine-variety, with four shows a day; added waxworks and side shows in different floors and a zoo and freak shows. In 1908 he took over the Clydebank Gaiety Theatre, also for cine-variety and soon grew his own cinema circuit in the Glasgow area. Among many performers at the weekly amateur night at his venues, starting with the Britannia Panopticon was a sixteen year old Arthur Stanley Jefferson also known as Stan Laurel.

Pickard expanded his cinema circuit in the Glasgow area including building anew, such as the White Elephant in Shawlands, Glasgow, in 1927. Pickard bought and sold numerous houses, shops and real estate, boasting he had more properties than Glasgow Corporation. Frequently buying at auctions and soon reselling. Two sizeable estates he bought for his own family uses were Formakin House (purchased c. 1940). and in 1962 Bannockburn House near Stirling. He also bought property in England including in September 1939 the mansion, estate and private racecourse at The Dicker, near Eastbourne, developed by former MP Horatio Bottomley, founder of the Financial Times and of the John Bull magazine. It had cost Bottomley £250,000. Pickard bought it at auction for £2,850.

In 1951 he stood for Parliament in Glasgow Maryhill as the Independent Millionaire candidate but only got 356 votes. His advertising reflected his love of large cars, often in bright colours including some 18 Rolls-Royces. He died in 1964, age 90, the result of a fire at his palatial mansion on Great Western Road, Glasgow.
