= Websters Theatre, Glasgow =

Repurposed Presbyterian church building

Websters Theatre
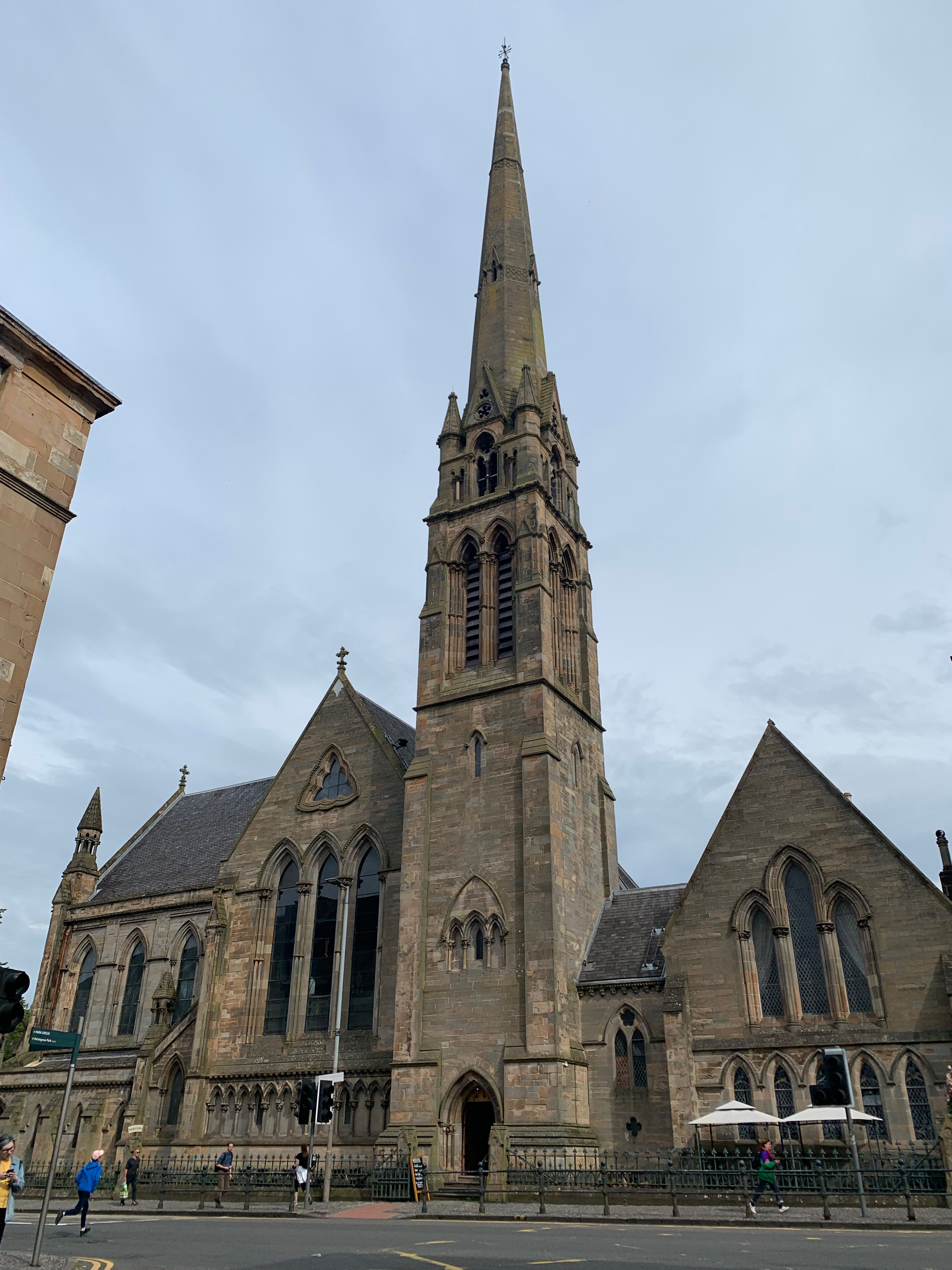
- Interactive map of Websters Theatre
- Former names: Lansdowne Parish Church
- Address: 416, Great Western Road
- Location: Glasgow, Scotland
- Coordinates: 55°52′28″N 4°16′42″W
- Public transit

Listed Building – Category A
- Designated: 15 December 1970
- Reference no.: LB32205

Construction
- Built: 1862–1863
- Opened: 1863 (as a church); 2014 (as a theatre)
- Closed: 2014 (as a church)
- Cost: £12,400
- Architect: John Honeyman

Website
- Website

Websters is a theatre in Glasgow, Scotland. It also operates as a bar and restaurant. Websters occupies the building of the 19th century former Lansdowne Parish Church.

== Early years of the church ==
The building was founded as the Lansdowne United Presbyterian Church. It was built between 1862 and December 1863 in the Neo-Gothic style, on designs by John Honeyman. The total cost amounted to £12,400. A spire was built with a height of 66.5 metres (218 feet), which today is considered a Glasgow iconic landmark and one of the slimmest spires in Europe. In 1900, the church was renamed Lansdowne United Free Church, while in 1929, after the union with the Church of Scotland, it was renamed Lansdowne Parish Church.

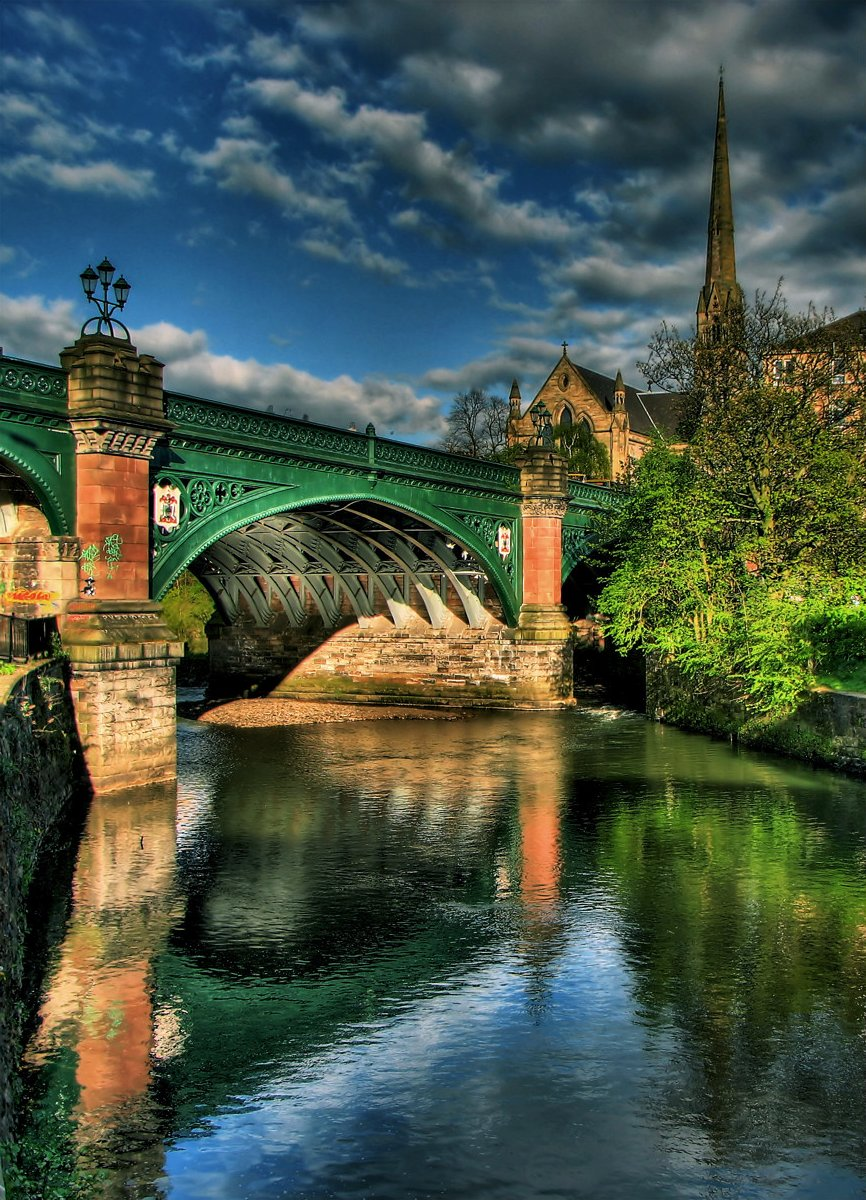
The building towering over the Great Western Bridge.

== Works of art ==
In 1865, three stained glass windows, designed by Ward and Hughes were installed in the apse, with others added in 1873. A number of stained glass windows were also added in 1913 by Alfred Webster, and in the 1950s by his son Gordon Webster. A war memorial frieze by Evelyn Beale was built in 1923. In 1911, the pipe organ, the work of Norman and Beard, was installed.

== Closure and conversion ==
The church continued to function as a Parish church of the Church of Scotland until 2014, when the parish was united with Kelvin Stevenson parish, forming the Kelvinbridge Parish Church. The parish decided to use the Kelvin Stevenson Memorial Church as their church building, and the Lansdowne church building was sold.

== Present use ==
In 2014, the church was sold and converted into a theatre, which also included a bar and restaurant in the former church halls. The building was renamed Websters in honour of Alfred Websters who designed some of the stained glass windows of the church. In 2017, the venue was briefly closed after masonry fell from the steeple. The current theatre can seat up to a 188 people and holds concerts and shows throughout the year. It also contains a Playhouse which seats 55 people. As of Summer 2025, the Glasgow Comedy Club, The Stand will move there from Woodlands Road, 100 yards away, they have signed a 25 year lease.
