= James Lawton Wingate =

Scottish painter

- Born: 9 October 1846; Glasgow, Scotland
- Died: 22 April 1924 (aged 77); Edinburgh, Scotland

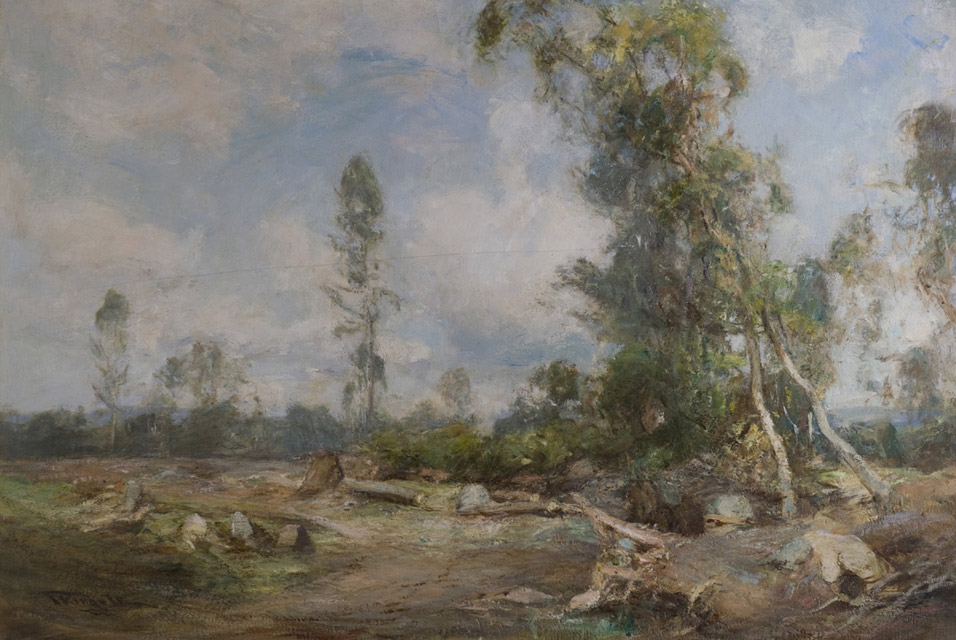
River landscape painting

Sir James Lawton Wingate (9 October 1846 – 22 April 1924) was a Scottish painter of the late nineteenth century.

== Early career and Italian tour ==
He was born in Kelvinhaugh, Glasgow, and initially worked as a commercial clerk, taking drawing lessons in the early morning. Initially he was influenced by Ruskin and the Pre-Raphaelites, and first exhibited in 1864 at the Glasgow Fine Art Institute. The appreciation he received led him to abandon his job and tour Italy in 1867-68 where he created 150 watercolour drawings.

== Return to Scotland ==
Returning to Scotland, he lived at Hamilton, and developed a keen skill in painting landscapes and woodland scenes while studying at the Royal Scottish Academy (RSA). He met Hugh Cameron at Comrie, in Perthshire, in the autumn of 1873. Cameron was a genial and helpful critic. Wingate defended his work as being true to fact and Cameron's reply "I feel the work to be wrong and art is not an affair of argument, it is an affair of feeling" is said to have been a significant impact on Wingate.

== Crieff and Muthill ==
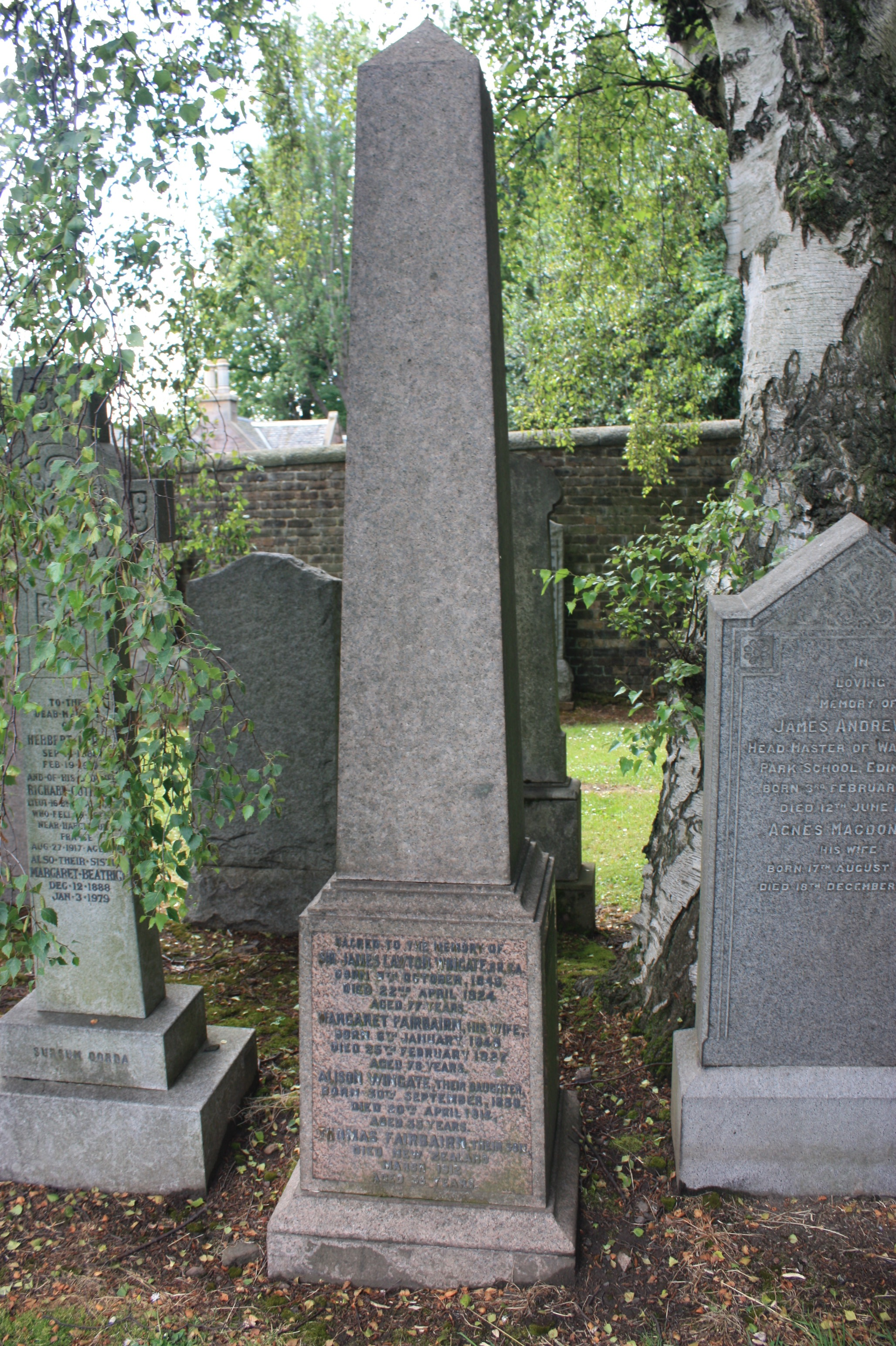
The grave of Sir James Lawton Wingate, Grange Cemetery, Edinburgh

In 1874 he moved to Crieff and later to Muthill, painting rustic genre scenes and later increasingly impressionistic landscapes which made his reputation. After 1880 he exhibited regularly at the RSA.

In 1896 the influential art dealer Alexander Reid organised an exhibition of 63 of Wingate's works at his St Vincent Street Gallery in Glasgow, and in December 1911 exhibited a further 30, the latter being shared with works by William McTaggart.

He became President of the RSA in 1919, also the year in which he was knighted. Later he moved to Colinton and afterwards to Slateford, both in the vicinity of Edinburgh. He resigned as President of the RSA shortly before his death in Edinburgh, aged 77, in 1924. He is buried near the south-west corner of the western extension to Grange Cemetery.
