= Thomas Gildard =

Scottish architect (died 1895)

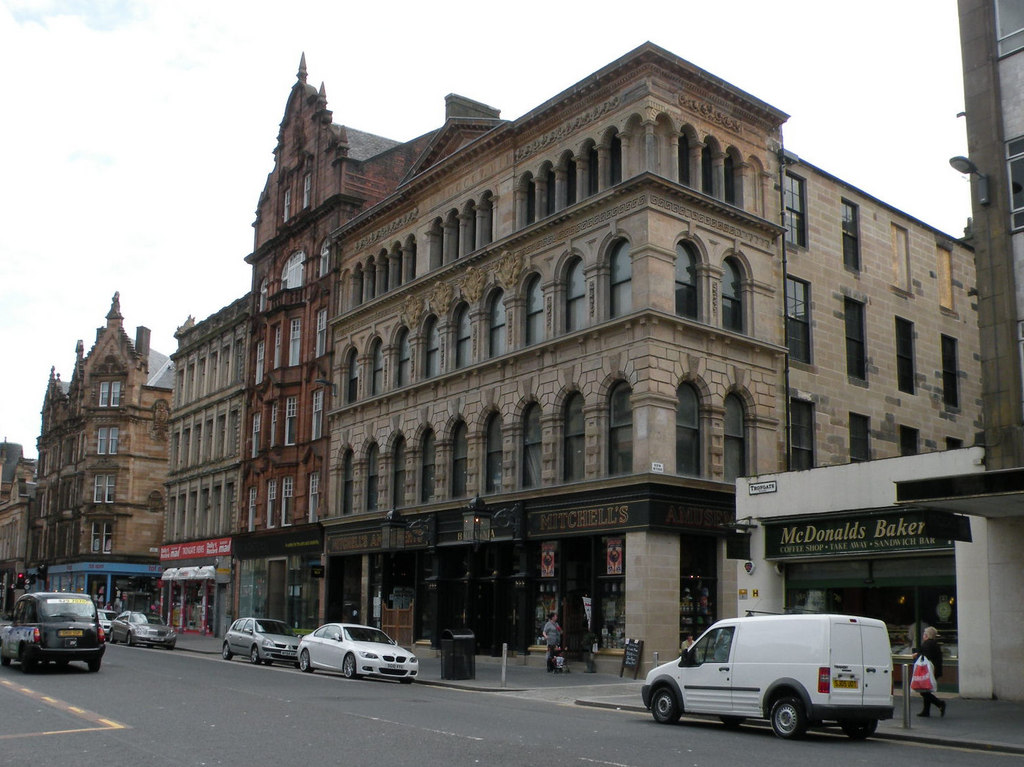
The Britannia Music Hall in Glasgow

Thomas Gildard (nicknamed Gildey) (1822 – 5 December 1895) was a 19th-century Scottish architect and author. In a short career as a private architect alongside Robert Macfarlane, before entering public service as deputy to Glasgow's Master of Works, buildings designed by him and his professional partner are: the Clyde Thread Works, also known as Clyde Thread Mills; Belgrave Terrace on the southside of Great Western Road, Glasgow; Ardenvhor fronting the Gareloch; and in 1857/58 an Italianate warehouse in the Trongate, Glasgow for Archibald Blair, two floors of which opened on 25 December 1859 as the Britannia Music Hall (which continues today).

== Life ==
His family were from Luss near Loch Lomond but he was born in a cottage hospital at Bonhill to the south. His father was John Gildard, a local hotelkeeper and his mother was Mary Taylor.

In December 1838 he was apprenticed to David Hamilton in Glasgow to train as an architect.

He entered a partnership Robert Macfarlane, son of cotton merchants, in 1852, who later married his sister Eliza. Sadly both Eliza and Robert died of consumption in 1862. Gildard then went to work with John Carrick, who had recently become Glasgow's Master of Works.

His work began to concentrate on his writings rather than his buildings. He is noted for a strong condemnation of Presbyterian Gothic in his paper "Church Architecture" of June 1856, and for strong condemnation of the National Monument Committee in their treatment of his lifelong friend, John Thomas Rochead, in relation to the committee's failure to pay Rochead for his work on the Wallace Monument.

He was a friend of Alexander "Greek" Thomson and the Mossman family.

He died of bronchitis at home, 133 Berkeley Street, Glasgow, on 5 December 1895.

He is buried in Glasgow Necropolis, his monument being designed by the Mossmans with a low-relief portrait head by William Shirreffs.

== Architectural works ==
- Clyde Thread Works, Glasgow (1854) also known as Clyde Thread Mills, Main Street, Bridgeton at Rutherglen Bridge built for John Dick & Sons
- Belgrave Terrace, Great Western Road, Glasgow (1856)
- Ardenvohr, Rhu, Gareloch (1858) built for Colin Dunlop Wilson, son of ironmaster and coalmaster John Wilson of Dundyvan, Lanarkshire
- Trongate, Glasgow warehouse for Archibald Blair 1857/58, part of which first opened in late 1859 as the Britannia Music Hall Glasgow

== Written works ==
Writings by Gildard include:

- Architectural Excursions (1867)
- Obituary to Alexander "Greek" Thomson in "Building News", 26 March 1875
- Mr. Alexander Thomson, British Architect (1875)
- Memoirs of John Carrick (1890)
- Memoirs of Alexander Thomson (1890)
- Memoirs of John Mossman (1892)
- An Old Glasgow Architect on Some Older Ones (1895), memoir
