= Stephen Adam (stained glass designer) =

Scottish stained glass designer

Stephen Adam (1848–1910) was a 19th/20th-century Scottish stained glass designer. He was a pioneer of modern stained glass in Scotland (in terms of colour use, and black in particular). The majority of his work is in the Pre-Raphaelite style, often with a twist towards Celtic mythology, and is mainly sited in western Scotland. Although the bulk of his work is for churches he also received many secular commissions.

== Life ==
He was born at Bonnington Haugh north of Edinburgh (now absorbed by the city) the son of Alexander Adam. He was educated at Canonmills School.

In 1861 he was apprenticed to the Edinburgh stained glass designers, the Ballantine Brothers. He also attended art classes at the Trustees Academy in Edinburgh and Haldane's Academy in Glasgow (later to become Glasgow School of Art).

In 1865 he joined the studios of Daniel Cottier at 47 Carrick Street in Glasgow. In 1870 he left to set up his own business at 121 Bath Street in partnership with David Small (1846-1927). He was then living at 4 Cathkin Terrace in the Cathcart district. The partnership was dissolved in 1885.

He set up new premises at 7 Scott Street in the Garnethill district, then living at 276 Renfrew Street. Expanding rapidly he moved to 259 West George Street and moved house to 1 Holmhead Crescent back in Cathcart, before finally moving to a six-storey studio at 231 St Vincent Street in the city centre.

From 1889 he trained other stained glass artists including his son, Stephen Adam, David Gauld and Alf Webster. In 1896 the firm became Adam & Son but a family dispute caused them to split in 1904 (as Webster only joined in 1905 it was not a jealousy of the son as some speculate).

He died at Bath Street in Glasgow in August 1910 and his work was continued by Alf Webster. Webster's career was cut short whilst serving in the Gordon Highlanders in the First World War when he was fatally wounded in the battlefield and died at Le Touquet Red Cross Station in 1915.

== Publications ==
- Stained Glass:Its History and Development (1877)
- Truth in Decorative Art: Stained Glass Medieval and Modern (1896)

== Notable works ==
- Paisley Abbey
- Kidston memorial window, Cambuslang
- Tobias Smollett window and Heritors windows at Bonhill (1880)
- Clark memorial, Paisley
- Belhaven Parish Church, Glasgow (with Andrew Wells) (1877)
- Industry panels at Maryhill Burgh Halls
- Industry panels at the People's Palace, Glasgow
- The Life of Christ: New Kilpatrick Church, Bearsden
- The Baptism of Christ, Henderson Memorial window etc. Lecropt Church, Stirlingshire (1907)
- Shipping panels, boardroom of the Clydeport Authority
- Kilmore Church, Dervaig on the Isle of Mull (1905 onwards) completed by Alf Webster
- The Works of Mercy, North Berwick Parish Church
- Charity and Music windows Craigrownie Church, Loch Long
- St Columba's Church, Largs (1892)
- Clark Memorial Church, Largs (1892)
- St andrew's Church, St Andrews Square, Glasgow
- Baptismal window, Dumbarton St Augustine's Episcopal Church
- Annan Town Hall
- Inverness Town House
- Imperial Bar, Howard Street, Glasgow
- Carnegie Library, Ayr
- Carnegie Library, Dumfries
- Sick Children's Hospital, Glasgow
- Dowanhill Church, Glasgow
- New Mental Hospital, Glasgow
- Glasswork in Devonshire Gardens
- Glasswork for Sir Charles Cayzer at Gartmore House
- Broughton House in Kirkcudbright for his friend Edward Atkinson Hornel
- The Magi, Alloway Church
- Pollokshields Congregational Church
- Glasgow Royal Infirmary, ante-chapel
- St Michael and All Angels, Helensburgh
- Royal Prince Albert Hospital, New South Wales
- Works in the various mansions of the Pullar family of Pullars of Perth
- Works in the various mansions of the Coats family of Pullars of Paisley
- Stained glass at St John's Kirk, Perth
- St James Episcopal Church, Leith (removed and now in private ownership)
- Dalrymple Parish Church, Dalrymple, Ayr.
