= David Gauld =

Scottish artist (1865–1936)

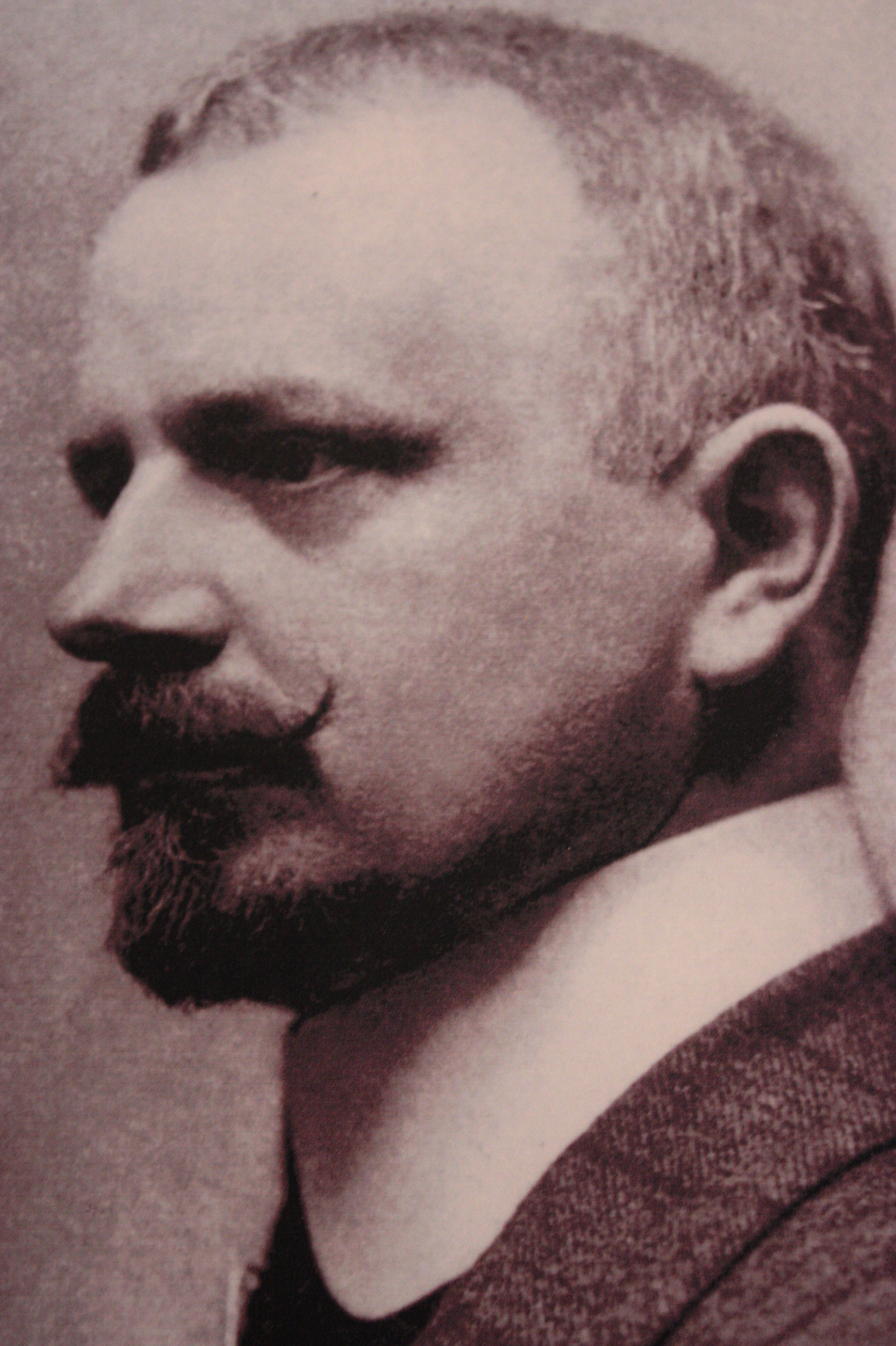
- Stipple-point of David Gauld c.1895
- Born: 7 November 1865; Glasgow
- Died: 18 June 1936 (aged 70); East Kilbride
- Education: Glasgow School of Art
- Known for: Painting

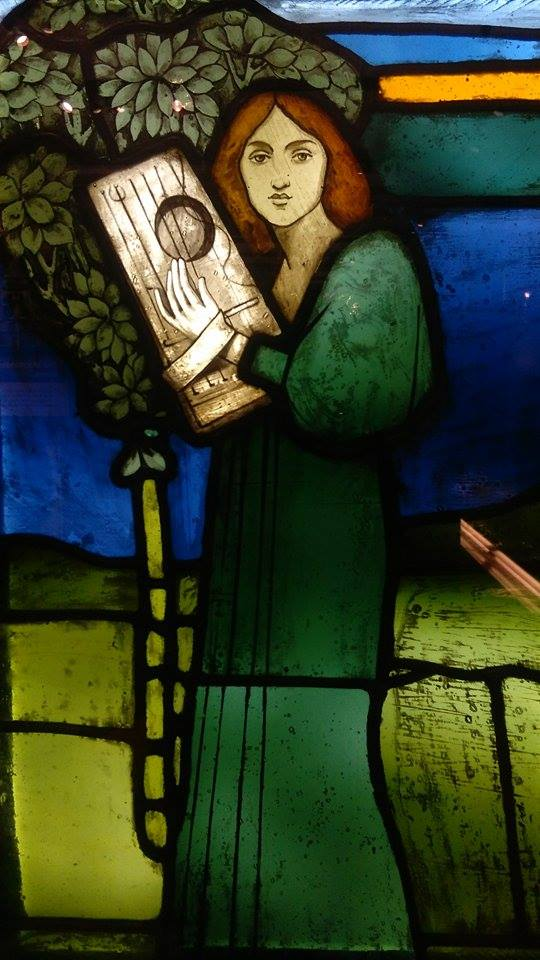
Music, stained glass by David Gauld 1891 (detail)

David Gauld (7 November 1865 – 18 June 1936) was an important Scottish artist who worked in both oils and stained glass and was regarded as being one of the innovators within the Glasgow Boys group. Some of his works, such as St Agnes and Music are seen as precursors of the Art Nouveau movement. His works were seen as having both a Japanese and Pre-Raphaelite influence upon them.

== Biography ==
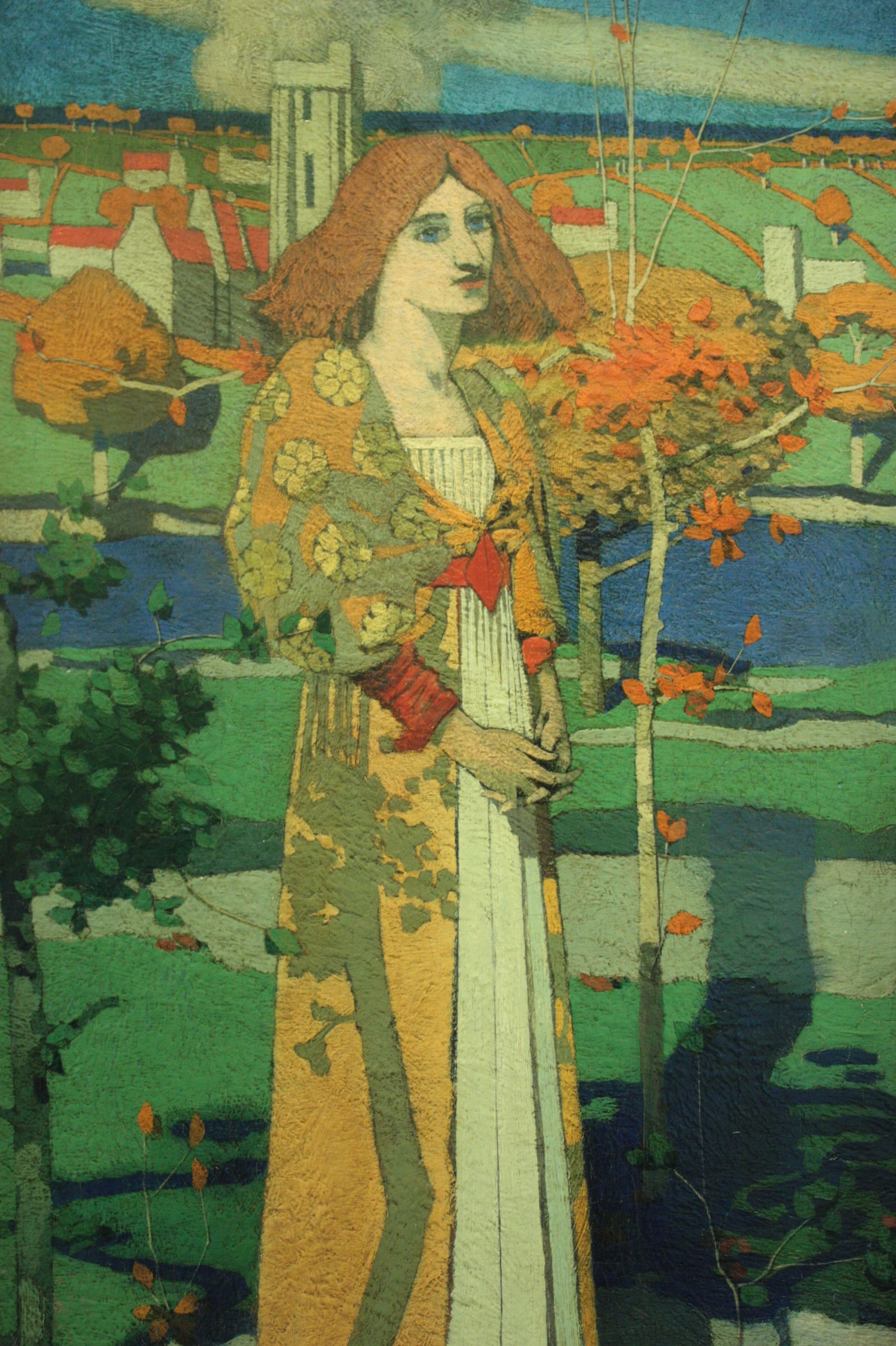
St Agnes by David Gauld 1889, National Gallery of Scotland

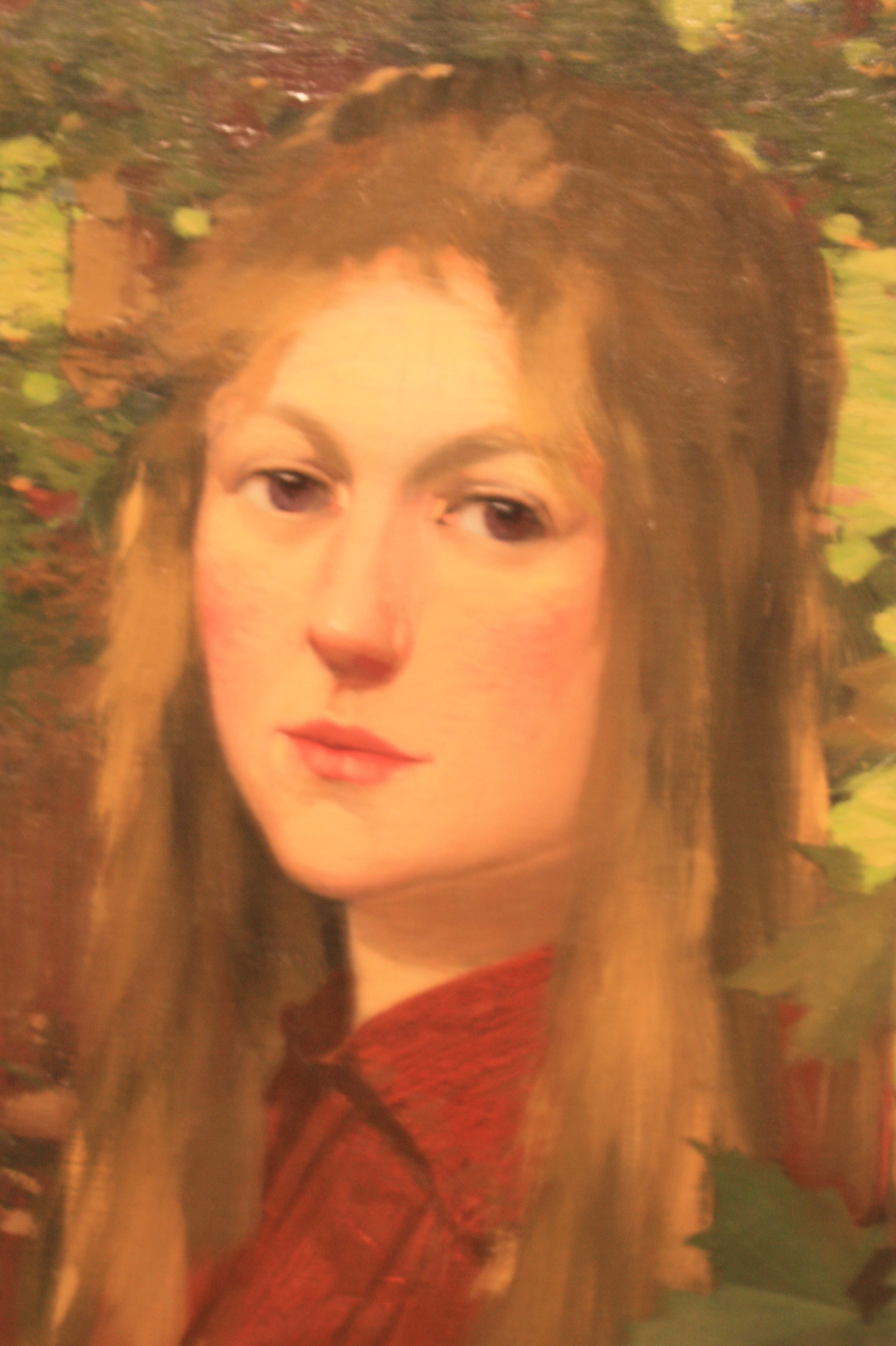
Portrait head by David Gauld, 1893

Gauld was born in Glasgow and served an apprenticeship as a lithographer and stained glass designer under Stephen Adam and then attended Glasgow School of Art from 1882 to 1885. He came to public notice in the 1880s when he supplied a series of Japanese-influenced pen and ink drawings for the Glasgow Weekly Citizen.

Gauld shared the Castlemains Studio in Kirkcudbright with William Stewart MacGeorge and then in later life shared a studio with Harrington Mann at 31 St Vincent Street in Glasgow from 1891 to 1894. During this time he designed stained glass windows for Guthrie and Wells. In 1895 Gauld appears to have split from Mann, and their friendship ended. Gauld then took new premises at 138 West George Street in Glasgow. He also lived at various locations in Kirkcudbright, Glasgow and North Berwick. In 1889 he returned to the Glasgow School of Art and was promoted by Alexander Reid. He later also studied in Paris for a period that year. Like other artists from Glasgow, Gauld spent time at the artists colony at Grez-sur-Loing in France.

He was elected an Associate member of the Royal Scottish Academy in 1918 and became a full member of the Academy in 1924. In 1935 he was appointed as director of Design Studies at Glasgow School of Art. He was sculpted by William Shirreffs in 1896.

Gauld died on 18 June 1936 at Lymekilns Nursing Home in East Kilbride. He is buried in East Kilbride Cemetery.

== Works ==
Gauld has works in most Scottish galleries, being particularly well represented in the Hunterian Art Gallery in Glasgow. His typical subjects included cows, calves and mills, but he did occasionally do portraiture. Works of note are:

- Raploch, Stirling, showing Stirling Castle, Glasgow Museums
- East Linton Mill, Glasgow Museums
- Robert Stewart, Lord Provost of Glasgow 1851-4, Glasgow Museums
- Mary in Brown, Hunterian Art Gallery
- The Ramparts of Montreuil-sur-Mer in Snow, Hunterian Art Gallery
- Chateau in Bruges, Hunterian Art Gallery
- Music, Hunterian Art Gallery
- St Agnes, National Gallery of Scotland
- Kirkcudbright Castle, East Ayrshire Council
- Kirkcudbright, Dumfries and Galloway Council

== Stained Glass ==
- The Druids, Rosehaugh House. 1896
- Bellahouston Parish Church
- Skelmorlie Parish Church, 1895
- "Praise" window, Upper Largo, 1896
- "Music" Kelvingrove Art Gallery
