= Denis Peploe =

Scottish artist (1914–1993)

Denis Frederic Neal Peploe
- Born: 25 March 1914; Edinburgh, Scotland
- Died: 22 May 1993 (aged 79); Edinburgh, Scotland
- Education: Edinburgh Academy, Edinburgh College of Art, Andre Lhote
- Parent: Margaret and Samuel John Peploe

Denis Frederic Neal Peploe (25 March 1914 – 22 May 1993) was a Scottish artist and sculptor known for his landscapes.

== Biography ==
Peploe was born in Edinburgh as the younger son of Margaret and Samuel John Peploe. His father was an artist and Denis worked with him. Peploe went to school at the Edinburgh Academy.

Despite his father's advice, he then studied at Edinburgh College of Art and resolved to become an artist. He went on to study with the painter and sculptor Andre Lhote in Paris.

During the war he served with the Royal Artillery and the Special Operations Executive where he was hurt in a motorcycle accident. He had to recover until 1946 although he did not paint during this time. In 1947 he had a one-man show in Edinburgh. His landscapes and other paintings were again shown in Glasgow in London. Possibly due to his mother being from Barra he was known for his work featuring the Hebrides and the Western Highlands.

He was elected ARSA in 1956 and became a full member ten years later. Peploe taught at the Edinburgh College of Art from 1955 to 1977 whilst selling his work and contributing to the annual exhibition of the RSA.

Peploe died in Edinburgh. He had one son and a daughter with his wife Elizabeth (born Barr).

== Legacy ==
Peploe has paintings in public collections including, Kirkcaldy Museum and Art Gallery, Royal Scottish Academy, Aberdeen Art Gallery, Heriot-Watt University and the City of Edinburgh Council.
