= Britannia Music Hall =

Theatre in Glasgow, Scotland

The Britannia Music Hall
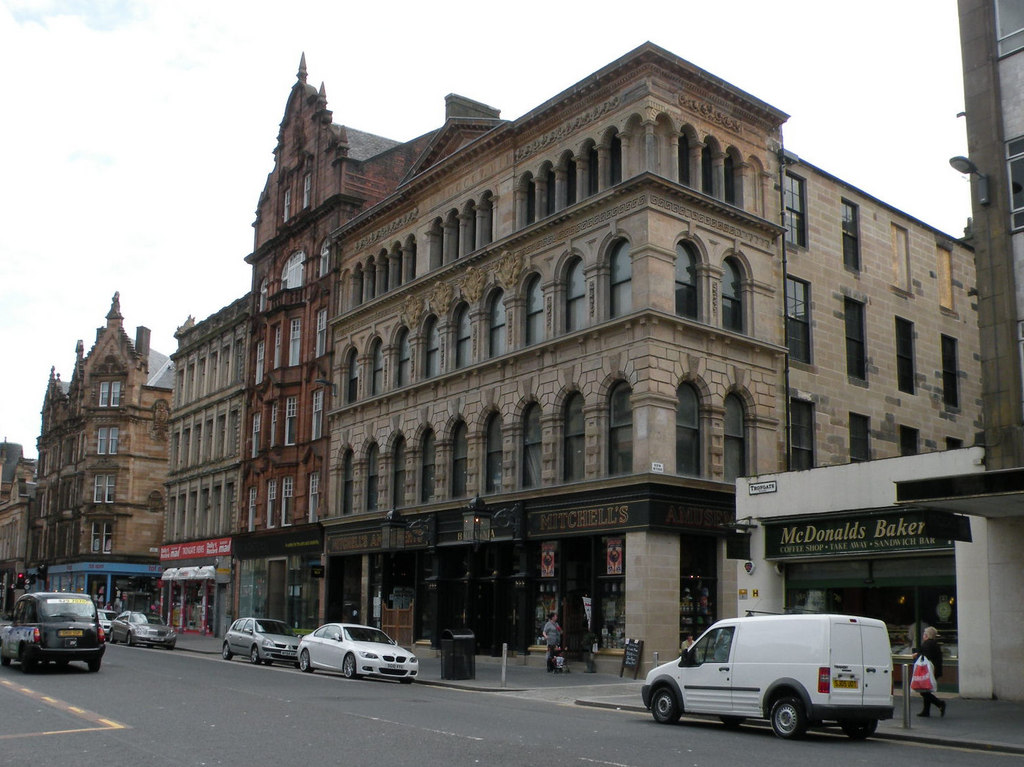
- The Britannia Music Hall in 2011 after outer restoration
- Interactive map of the The Britannia Music Hall area

General information
- Location: Glasgow, Scotland
- Coordinates: 55.8569536°N 4.2490324°W
- Opened: 25 December 1859

Design and construction
- Architecture firm: Gildard & MacFarlane architects
- Developer: Archibald Blair

Website
- www.britanniapanopticon.org

References
- https://canmore.org.uk/site/139671/glasgow-109-121-trongate-britannia-music-hall

The Britannia Music Hall (later known as The Panopticon or The Britannia Panopticon) in Trongate, Glasgow, Scotland is one of the oldest remaining music halls in Britain. It is located above an amusement arcade, at 113–117 Trongate.

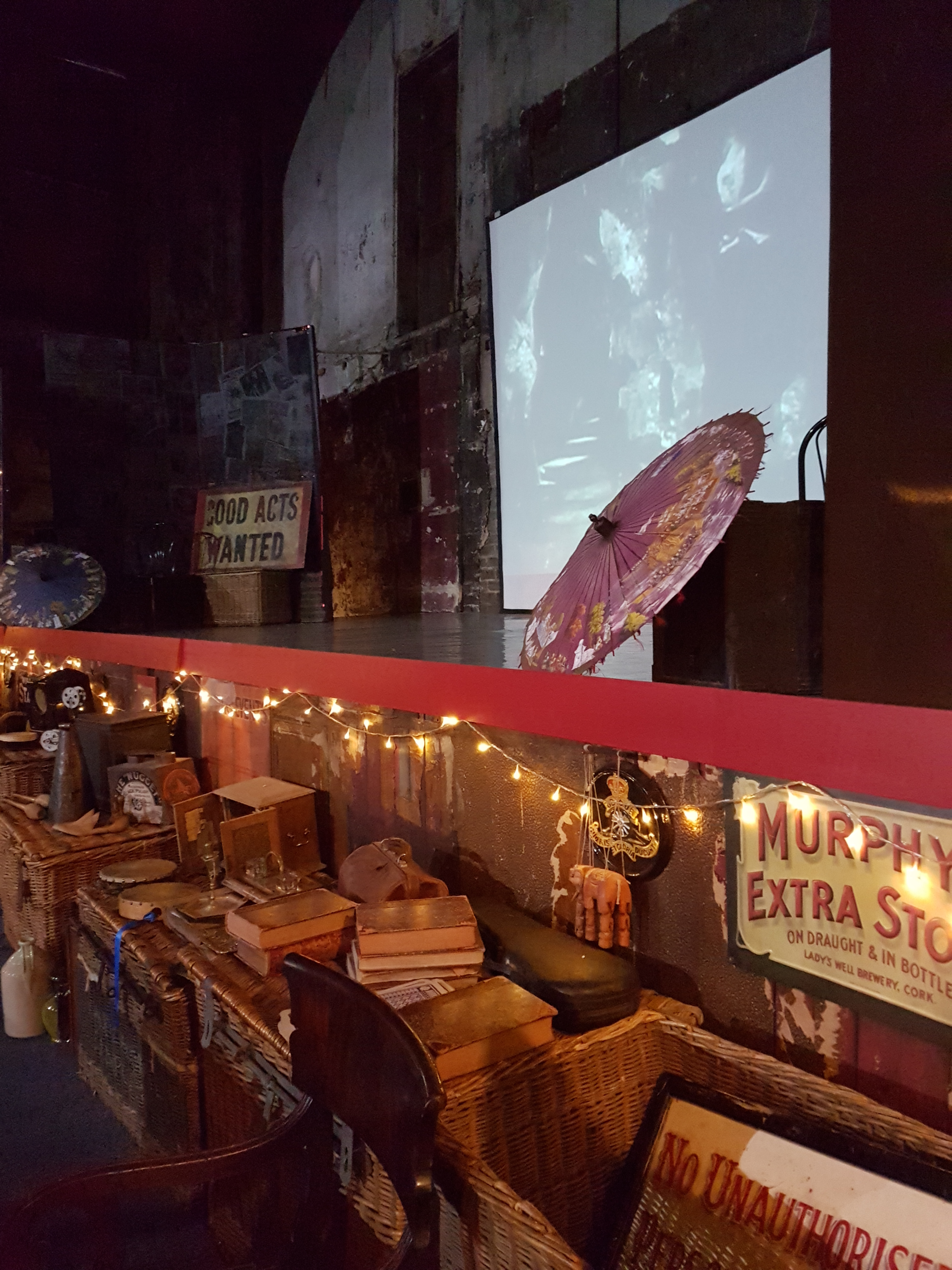
Britannia Music Hall, Glasgow

Built in 1857/58 by and for city builder Archibald Blair whose architects were Thomas Gildard and Robert H. M. MacFarlane, the Trongate building was a speculative building, soon with lessees for each of its four shops on the street level. The floors above were advertised as being suitable for a drapery warehouse, but they opened as an entertainment centre, firstly as the Britannia Music Hall.

Britannia Panopticon was an early building to become powered by electricity and one of the first cinema venues in Scotland. The Britannia Music Hall, leased to John Brand, opened on Christmas Day 1859. Successive lessees include HT Rossborough, William Kean, Arthur Hubner and AE Pickard and was closed in 1938 when the Trongate building was sold by the Pickard family to the multiple tailors Weaver to Wearer Ltd of Leeds, which in the 1950s became part of Great Universal Stores Ltd. Fortunately, following the removal of the false ceiling on floor one in 2003, the Britannia was opened again. It is currently being conserved by a trust who regularly perform traditional shows in the auditorium. In 1977 the building became a category A listed building.

The Panopticon Trust has been formed as a building preservation trust to help acquire and restore the entire building as an entertainment venue and as a hub for the community. An annual programme of entertainments and events is managed by the Friends of the Britannia Music Hall Trust.

== Architecture and history of the building ==
By 1840, on the venue's present site, there was a four storey commercial building. The new successor property, built and owned by Archibald Blair in 1857, completed in 1858, was designed by architects Thomas Gildard & Robert Macfarlane. complete with a major facade in grand Italianate style.

The classical and elegant design of the front of the building shows cherubs, carved swags and Grecian decoration. The auditorium is finished mostly of wood. The stalls and a horseshoe balcony accommodated the audience. It was not an adjunct to a pub nor a supper room. It held 1700 people and if the level above was brought into use, but was not, it could have held 2500.

The music hall occupies the first and second floors of the building. However, it probably reached its final form in 1869, with a staircase entry from the ground floor vestibule opening onto Trongate.

The building went through many upgrades and alterations throughout the years. The first lessee, John Brand, a discharged bankrupt who previously ran a singing saloon in the Saltmarket, named it Britannia Music Hall and in the early 1860s, he added long, wooden pews in the balcony. Extensive refurbishment (including major redecoration and renovations) also took place when the Rossboroughs took over the lease of the Hall in 1869. The building was modernised in 1896, under management of William Kean, with the redecoration and installation of the electric light throughout the building. The building also became equipped with a cinematograph, thanks to lessee Arthur Hubner. The building briefly closed in 1903 for works to be carried out, with the addition of a new staircase and a door at the stage side of the auditorium.

The Britannia Panopticon closed in 1938. The seating was stripped from the stalls area and a pitch-roofed structure across between the balconies was built. This structure (or false ceiling) separated the upper part of the auditorium from the lower area, which became a store for the retailer. The entrance to the music hall, including the vestibule and front staircase, was removed.

== The "Panopticon" ==
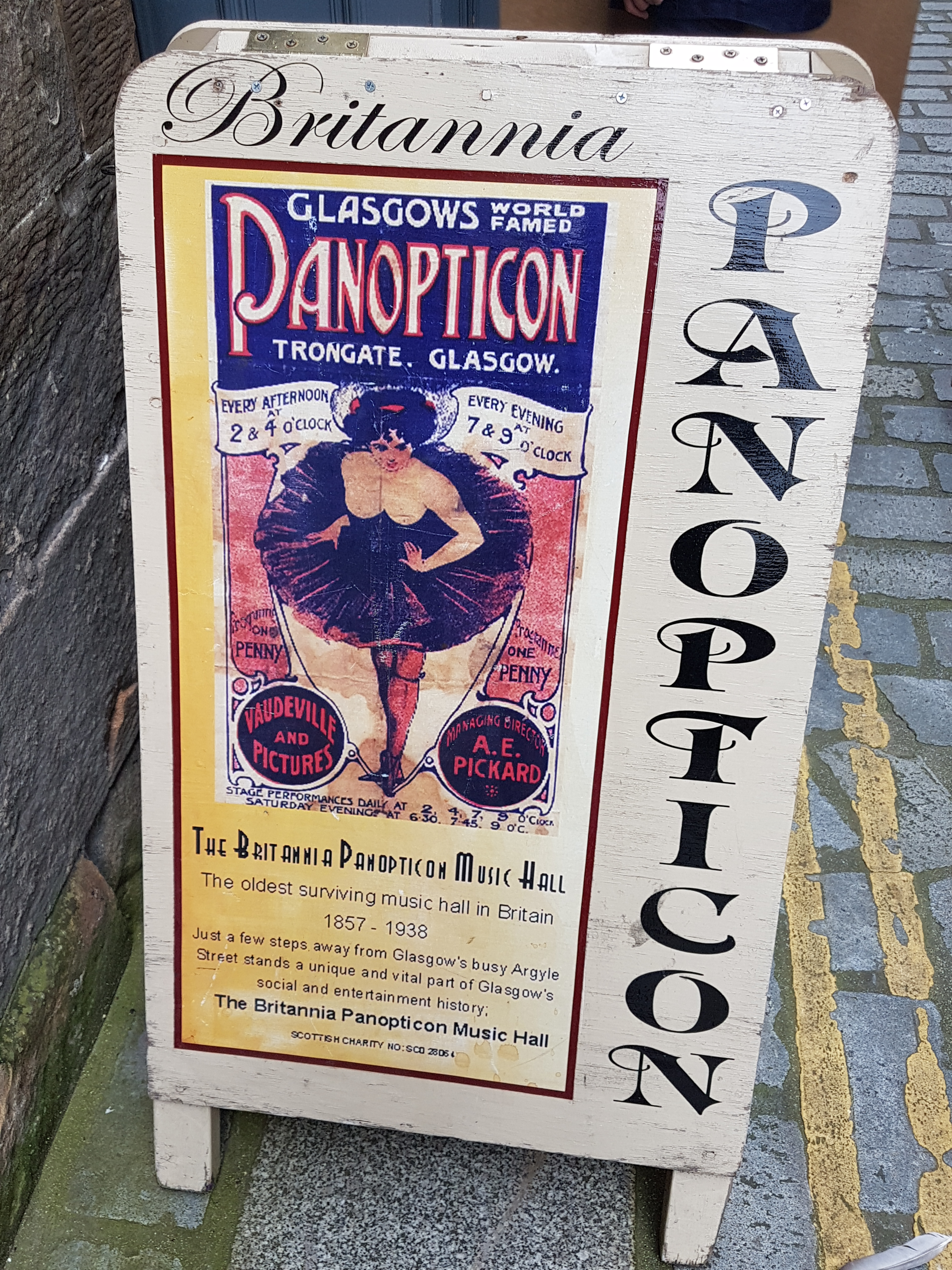
Advertising outside Britannia Music Hall

Over the years, the Britannia changed management several times. In 1906, A. E. Pickard leased the Music Hall ( much later buying the whole building from the Archibald Blair Trust around 1915) changing its name to the Panopticon. The word 'Panopticon' means "to view everything", derived from the Greek terms 'Pan' meaning "everything" and 'Opti' meaning "to see".

Pickard undertook some major works and brought in his American museum and waxworks from 101 Trongate, with the result that the entertainment seating was reduced to 500. Pickard also excavated the basement of the hall and installed an indoor zoo. He opened his “Noah’s Ark and Glasgow Zoo” on the ground floor of the Panopticon in 1908.

Under Pickard’s management (1906–1938), the Panopticon offered a variety of entertainments, such as the amateur nights, exhibition of animals, film shows (interspersed with live acts), showing of sporting events films, clog-dancing competitions, or boxing demonstrations. The boxer Jem Mace performed publicly for the last time at the Panopticon in 1910.

== Some notable performers ==
The Britannia has hosted some of the biggest names on the Music hall circuit. The table below lists some of them. In 1906 Stan Laurel made his first stage appearance there on amateur night.

Artist	Date of first appearance at the Britannia (if known)	Operator of the Hall	Main characteristics
Dan Leno	1866	John Brand	Comedian and clog dancer
Vesta Tilley	1885	Mr and Mrs Rossborough	Male impersonator
Bessie Bellwood	1881	Mr and Mrs Rossborough	Comedienne and singer
Jenny Hill	1882	Mr and Mrs Rossborough	Comic and singer
James Curran	1890	Mrs Rossborough	Songwriter and writer of parodies
W. F. Frame	1893	William Kean	Comical act
Harry Champion	1893	William Kean	Comic and singer
Marie Loftus	1894	William Kean	Music-hall performer
Dr Walford Bodie	1897	Arthur Hubner	Electrical experiments, magic, ventriloquism, mesmerism
Harry Lauder	1897	Arthur Hubner	Comic singer
Stan Laurel	1906	Albert Ernest Pickard	Comic
Jack Buchanan		Albert Ernest Pickard	Comedy/singing act

== Bibliography ==
- Bowers, Judith (2007). Stan Laurel and other tales of the Panopticon: the story of the Britannia Music Hall. Edinburgh: Birlinn.
- Bowers/MacLay, Judith (2014), Glasgow`s Lost Theatre: the story of the Britannia Music Hall, published by Birlinn.
- Maloney, Paul (2016). The Britannia Panopticon music hall and cosmopolitan entertainment culture. Basingstoke: Palgrave Macmillan.
