= Kelvin Stevenson Memorial Church =

Coordinates: 55.8777°N 4.2791°W

- Kelvinbridge Parish Church
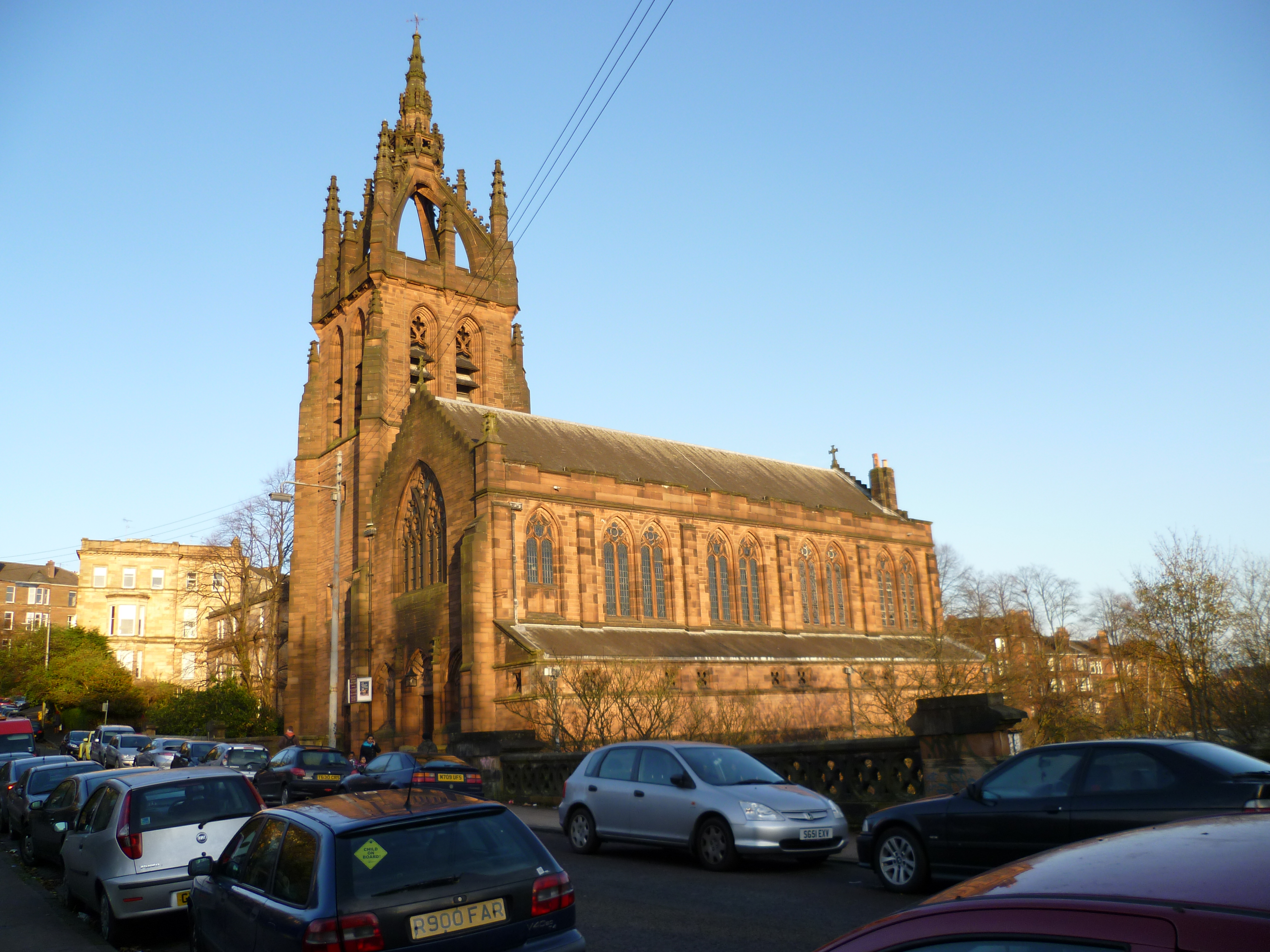
- Kelvin Stevenson Memorial Church, 2011
- Kelvin Stevenson Memorial Church
- Location: Glasgow
- Country: Scotland
- Denomination: Church of Scotland

History
- Former name: Nathanial Stevenson Memorial Free Church
- Status: Parish church

Architecture
- Functional status: Closed
- Architect: J. J. Stevenson
- Architectural type: Church
- Style: Gothic Revival
- Years built: 1898-1902
- Completed: 27 February 1902
- Closed: November 2024

Administration
- Parish: North Kelvinside

Listed Building – Category A
- Designated: 15 December 1970
- Reference no.: LB33753

Kelvinbridge Parish Church, also known as the Kelvin Stevenson Memorial Church, is a former Church of Scotland parish church, serving part of the North Kelvinside area of Glasgow, Scotland.

== Building ==
This distinctive church was designed by the architect J. J. Stevenson and built 1898–1902. Red sandstone is used, as in many buildings in Glasgow. It was built by the Free Church of Scotland as the Nathanial Stevenson Memorial Free Church, becoming part of the United Free Church of Scotland in 1900, which in turn united with the Church of Scotland in 1929.

The church has a "crown tower", similar to the Chapel of King's College, Aberdeen and St. Giles Cathedral in Edinburgh. The church is located adjacent to the River Kelvin in Belmont Street at Belmont Bridge.

== History ==
The current congregation has been created by a union of several churches in the area, including the former East Park Church, Kelvinside Old Church and Wilton Church. In 2014 Kelvin Stevenson united with Lansdowne Parish Church to form the new Kelvinbridge Parish Church.

== Ministry ==
The current minister (since 2003) is the Reverend Gordon Kirkwood.

== See also ==
- List of Church of Scotland parishes
