= Daniel Cottier =

Scottish artist (1838–1891)

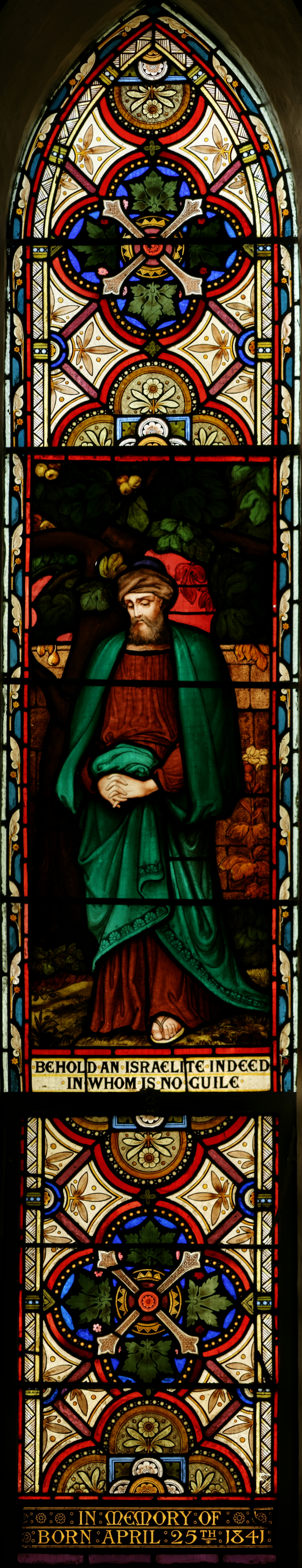
Lyon and Cottier, Stained glass panel in the transept of St. John's Anglican Church, Ashfield, New South Wales (NSW).

Daniel Cottier (1838 – 1891) was a British artist and designer born in Anderston, Glasgow, Scotland. His work was said to be influenced by the writing of John Ruskin, the paintings of the Dante Gabriel Rossetti and the work of William Morris. He painted allegorical figures in the Pre-Raphaelite style of Rossetti and Edward Burne-Jones. Cottier is considered to be an important influence on Louis Comfort Tiffany and also is credited with introducing the Aesthetic Movement to America and Australia.

Cottier was interested in glass, furniture, ceramic manufacture, and interior design. His art furnishing business opened branches in Edinburgh, Glasgow and London between 1864 and 1869. In 1873 he opened branches in New York, Sydney and Melbourne. In the United States he is seen as a 'harbinger of aestheticism….and a profound influence on American decoration'. He exported the Aesthetic Movement to Scotland via his many professional and business contacts which he had made during his training and early career in Scotland. By the time he moved to London in 1869, Cottier was already part of an influential and avart-garde group of designers—many of them also expatriate Scots—who were to establish the Aesthetic Movement in England.

== Family life ==
Daniel Cottier was born in 1838, the son of Margaret McLean (1807–1885) and Daniel Cottier (1761–1843), a master mariner. In the Census of 1841, he is recorded with his family in Carrick Street, off the Broomielaw in Glasgow. By 1851, he was working as an apprentice coach painter, living in North Woodside Road. In 1861, he was boarding in Francis Street, St Pancras, London, working as a glass designer. In 1866, he married Marion Millar Field, of Edinburgh, and in 1867, their daughter, Isabella was born. They had four children, Archibald (1868), who died of whooping cough aged 20 months, William (1869), Alexander and Margaret.

== Training ==
His training began as an apprentice to glazing and decorating firm in Glasgow in the 1850s, first with the firm of David Keir (1802–65), then with John Cairney & Co (1828–65). Cairney's circle included the architect and designer Alexander "Greek" Thomson (1817–75), who was of international stature and one of the most original interpreters of the Greek Revival style. When Thomson was designing a building, he included coloured decoration, furniture and carpets in his drawings. His ornamentation and colour schemes also drew from Egyptian, Assyrian, and Persian cultures. Cottier in all probability came into contact, whilst an apprentice at Cairney's, with this unified eclecticism of Aesthetic Movement interiors of the 1870s.

Cottier subsequently worked for the stainer James Ballantine in Edinburgh, and attended evening classes at the Trustees' Academy, at which 'Ornamental Design' was taught. Around 1859 he went to London, where he may have worked for the stained glass makers, Ward & Hughes, while attending evening classes at The Working Men's College at 31 Red Lion Square in Holborn. Here he heard lectures given by the critic John Ruskin (1819–1900) and received drawing lessons from the artist Ford Madox Brown (1821–93). Cottier could not have been closer to the Pre-Raphaelites or to the stirrings of the Aesthetic Movement: in 1861 William Morris (1834–96) opened his decorating and furnishing partnership across from the College, at 8 Red Lion Square. This may have exposed Cottier to the colour theories being developed by Morris, whose subtle and resonant tertiary hues were beginning to replace the archaeologically inspired mid-century primaries favoured by designers such as Thomson.

In 1862, Cottier returned to Scotland to accept an appointment as manager of Field & Allan, a firm of slaters, glaziers and decorators based in Edinburgh and Leith (1797–1910). There he oversaw the glazing and decoration of Peddie and Kinnear's Pilrig Church near Leith (c. 1862–63). The surviving geometric glass cycle, bold and vigorous, was based on medieval grisaille work. It shows that by now Cottier had developed a keen sense of colour harmony, heavily reliant on the juxtaposition of contrasting primary or tertiary colours.

After managing Field & Allan for two years, Cottier felt sufficiently confident to open his own business in Edinburgh aged 26. He shared the top floor of 24 George Street with the architects Campbell Douglas and J. J. Stevenson. Cottier persuaded Andrew Wells (1845–1915), his talented young assistant at Field & Allan, to join the new venture, together with Stephen Adam (1848–1910) from Ballantine & Co, and Charles Gow (1830–1891). However, Cottier's connection with Field & Allan did not end completely: he married Marion, the late William Field's daughter, in Edinburgh on 15 June 1866.

== Cottier and Company ==
At the 1867 Paris International Exhibition, Cottier's armorial window received a prize, and was praised as 'magnificent …superb harmony of colours …the finest ornamental window in the Exhibition'. Encouraged by his growing success, in 1869 he moved the centre of his activities to London where, at 2 Langham Place, in partnership with Brydon, Wallace and John Bennett, he established 'Cottier and Company', which advertised as 'art furniture makers, mural decorators, and glass and tile painters'. Cottier may have been drawn to London by the artistic community of expatriate Scots who had settled there, referred to as 'the London brethren'. However, Cottier & Co's order books continued to be dominated by commissions in Scotland, and the studio expanded. Around 1871 Norman McLeod Macdougall (1852–1939) followed Cottier to London, where he became the chief glass painter and latterly designer. Cottier also began to visit Europe as he developed an interest in art dealing, which brought him into contact with Vincent van Gogh and Dutch artist, Matthew Maris (1839–1917), who arrived in London to work for Cottier around 1872. Maris, who accompanied him on visits to Norway and elsewhere, has been credited as the designer of 'some of Cottier's most successful windows of the 1870s'. Certainly, the figures on a window such as the Musician Angels at St Machar's Cathedral, Aberdeen (1873), assume the strong contraposto poses which often appear in Maris's drawings. Cottier was also responsible for decorating the interiors of the new Chapel at Cluny Castle in Aberdeenshire, before the Chapel later burnt down in the 1930s. Maris also painted panels for Cottier, but as he found the watery consistency of glass paints made them difficult to use, he later explained that 'the only things that exist by my hand (from Cottier's studio) I painted with oil colours against the light'.

Van Gogh visited Cottier's London showroom in 1876 and there he recalled seeing, 'Sketches for two church windows. In the middle of one was a portrait of a middle-aged lady—oh, such a noble face—with the words "Thy will be done". Elsewhere van Gogh noted, 'When there is style in a drawing he (Cottier) likes it well enough".

As well as capitalising on a taste for all things Aesthetic in Britain, Cottier helped to establish the Aesthetic Movement abroad. In 1873 he opened a New York branch at 144 Fifth Avenue. In New York, Boston and elsewhere, Cottier & Co supplied ecclesiastical and domestic stained glass imported from the London workshop, which came to employ over a hundred men. He also supplied a variety of other goods, from gasoliers to Oriental Carpetings, as well as decorating interiors and dealing in pictures and antiques, and Cottier's taste in Aesthetic furnishings and modern paintings spread across the States as far as Portland, Oregon. He encouraged native artists such as Albert Pinkham Ryder (1847–1917). Cottier remained an active designer on several American project between 1873–9.

In the 1880s, Cottier collaborated with the stained glass artists Louis Comfort Tiffany (1848–1933) and John La Farge (1835–1910). An important window made in about 1877 for the main hall of the Newport, Rhode Island, house of William Sherman (1843–1912), formerly attributed to La Farge, is now considered to be the work of Cottier.

Cottier's transatlantic experiences may have crossed over into his Scottish commissions, such as the Baptism of Christ in Paisley Abbey, Renfrewshire (c. 1880) which features an unusually bold exercise in depicting water-reeds blowing in the wind which seems to anticipate the landscape glass that Tiffany later developed in America. Cottier played a part in the strong late-nineteenth century ties between progressive Scottish and American glass, a trend which later resulted in American-developed techniques, particularly the exploration of streaky and opalescent glass, influencing the glass produced by the Glasgow School in the 1890s.

In 1873, Cottier began to export the Aesthetic Movement to Australia with the opening of a branch in Sydney in partnership with John Lamb Lyon (1835–1916), a fellow Scot with whom he had trained in Glasgow and London. Cottier made at least three trips to Australia between 1873 and 1890, but Lyon largely ran the business there. Cottier's contribution to the Australian branch was to supply Lyon with his talented assistants, Gow and Wells, who acted as its chief designers from the mid-1870s to the mid-1890s. Under the direction of Lyon and Wells, the firm of Cottier, Lyon & Co decorated a number of important private residences, churches, and public buildings, all in the latest London style, with windows initially imported from the London workshop.

== Death ==
As a result of his business interests abroad, Cottier became increasingly known as an art dealer. He began to amass a large private collection of paintings, apparently to supply a legacy for his family, as his recurrent rheumatic fever made him ineligible for life insurance. Cottier died of a heart attack on April 15, 1891, aged 53 while visiting Jacksonville, Florida for health reasons. He is interred at Woodlawn Cemetery in The Bronx, New York City. His firm survived in New York as picture dealers until 1915.

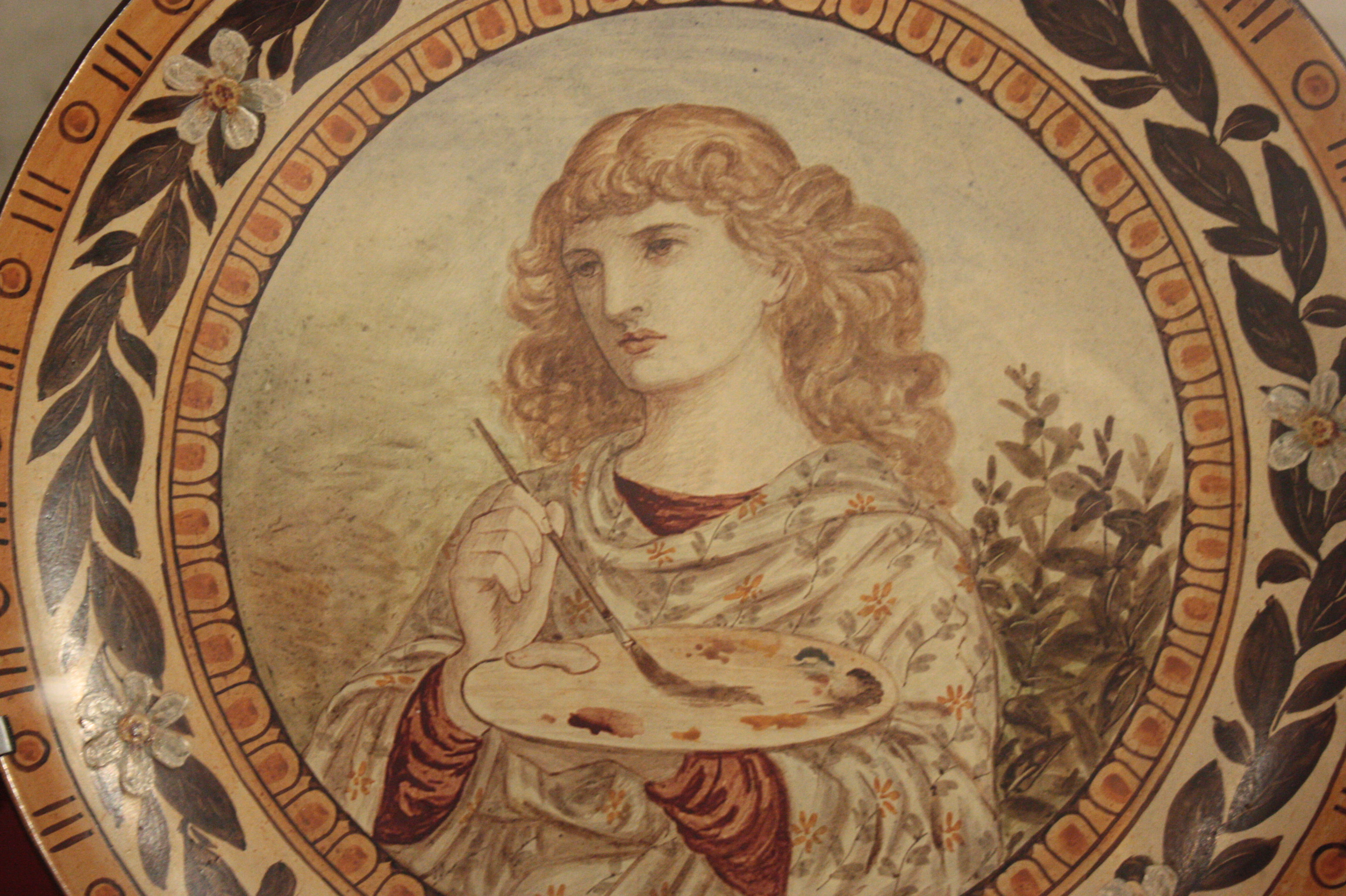
Plate by Daniel Cottier 1877 (detail) Royal Scottish Museum

== Legacy ==
By the time of his death, Cottier had undoubtedly contributed as much to the propagation of the Aesthetic Movement in Britain as he had abroad. Stephen Adam left Cottier & Co in 1870 to establish his own firm in Glasgow together with David Small (1846–1927). For the next two decades Adam & Small capitalised on the demand which Cottier had created for Aesthetic glass by producing a stream of confident windows dominated by Adam's figure drawings, which were based on Hart and Moore's Neo-Classical style. In 1873 Adam collaborated with Wells, shortly before he left for Australia, on the decoration and glazing of Belhaven Parish Church, Glasgow. Adam's glass at Belhaven borrowed heavily from the repertoire which he had learned from Cottier, including Japanese-style foliage, quarries and sunflowers, with figurative panels based on Millais' Parables, which may have been adapted from cartoons of identical windows produced in Cottier's studio.

Cottier emerges as an important figure in pioneering the Aesthetic Movement in Britain, in areas beyond the glass-painting with which he is most often associated. He was a talented colourist and ornamentalist. He oversaw the production of a range of glass, furniture, ceramics and interior schemes which, incorporating the designs of Godwin, Talbert, Moyr, Smith, Moore and others, testify to his position in avant-garde London design circles on the 1870s.

Prudhoe Hall (built 1868–70) and the Catholic Church of our Lady and St Cuthbert in Prudhoe (built 1890–91, but incorporating the Cottier windows from an earlier smaller chapel built 1868–70) have some of Cottier's earliest stained glass. Why did Matthew Liddell commission Daniel Cottier to design the stained glass windows in both the main hall and the original chapel? His architect, Archibald Dunn, presumably would have been impressed by the fact that Cottier had recently won a prize for the superb harmony of colours in his armorial window at the 1867 Paris International Exhibition. Indeed, Cottier has referred to his Paris prize in the graphite border of the large window in the main hall of Prudhoe Hall.

The stained glass in the small original chapel, which was opened on 19 October 1870, was eventually incorporated in the enlarged church of 1891 and then subsequently moved again a mile into the town of Prudhoe in 1904-5, when the Liddell family moved away from the area and could no longer support the Catholic mission, which Matthew Liddell had begun in 1870. The black-and-white photographs of the first chapel at Prudhoe Hall in Father Zielinski's book, "The Church That Moved", clearly show exactly the same windows containing the Cottier glass that have been retained in the larger church that replaced it. This means that the Cottier windows have been moved twice from their original site, and this would explain the necessity for so much extra remedial lead-work within some of the panes of glass, presumably repairing damage caused by two removals and two re-installations.

The small windows at Prudhoe Hall depicting idyllic naturalistic scenes of a rising sun over a river are especially beautiful and seem to have a strong similarity to the work of Louis Comfort Tiffany. Made around 1870, they pre-date by ten years or more the collaboration between Cottier and Tiffany in the 1880s in America. The swaying reeds in particular would seem to suggest that Cottier may well have been a significant influence on Tiffany before Tiffany returned the compliment as it were, and Cottier brought some of his ideas back into his own artistic creations in Scotland.

There are several Cottier stained glass windows and a decorative interior scheme situated in Glasgow's West End which are cared for by Four Acres Charitable Trust (FACT). FACT was founded in 1983 and acquired Cottiers Theatre, then Dowanhill Church, in 1984. The former Dowanhill Church, built in 1865 by William Leiper (1839–1916) and is an internationally important Category ‘A’ listed building due to its decorative scheme designed by Cottier. The Theatre also contains several stained glass windows by Cottier including Miriam and David (1867) and a rose window. FACT works to return important redundant Victorian buildings to a meaningful use and restore them in accordance with the highest conservation standards.

Four fine examples of his work may be found in Holy Trinity Church, Nice, France.
