= Susan Fletcher Crawford =

Scottish printmaker

- Born: 15 June 1863; Woodlands, Glasgow
- Died: 23 April 1918 (aged 54); Glasgow
- Education: Glasgow School of Art
- Known for: Etching
- Movement: Etching Revival

Susan Fletcher Crawford ARE (15 June 1863 – 23 April 1918) was a Scottish artist and printmaker, best known for her topographical etchings of Glasgow, the Scottish Highlands and other Scottish cities. Crawford was Teacher of Etching at the Glasgow School of Art between 1894 and 1917 and taught a number of artists who would become associated with the Etching Revival.

== Early life and education ==
Crawford was born in the Woodlands area of Glasgow, and at the age of seventeen she enrolled at the Glasgow School of Art where she attended between 1881 and 1888. Along with members of the Glasgow Girls, Crawford was an active participant in the school's programme of events initiated by the school headmaster Frances Newbery, including masques and tableaux vivants.

== Work and career ==
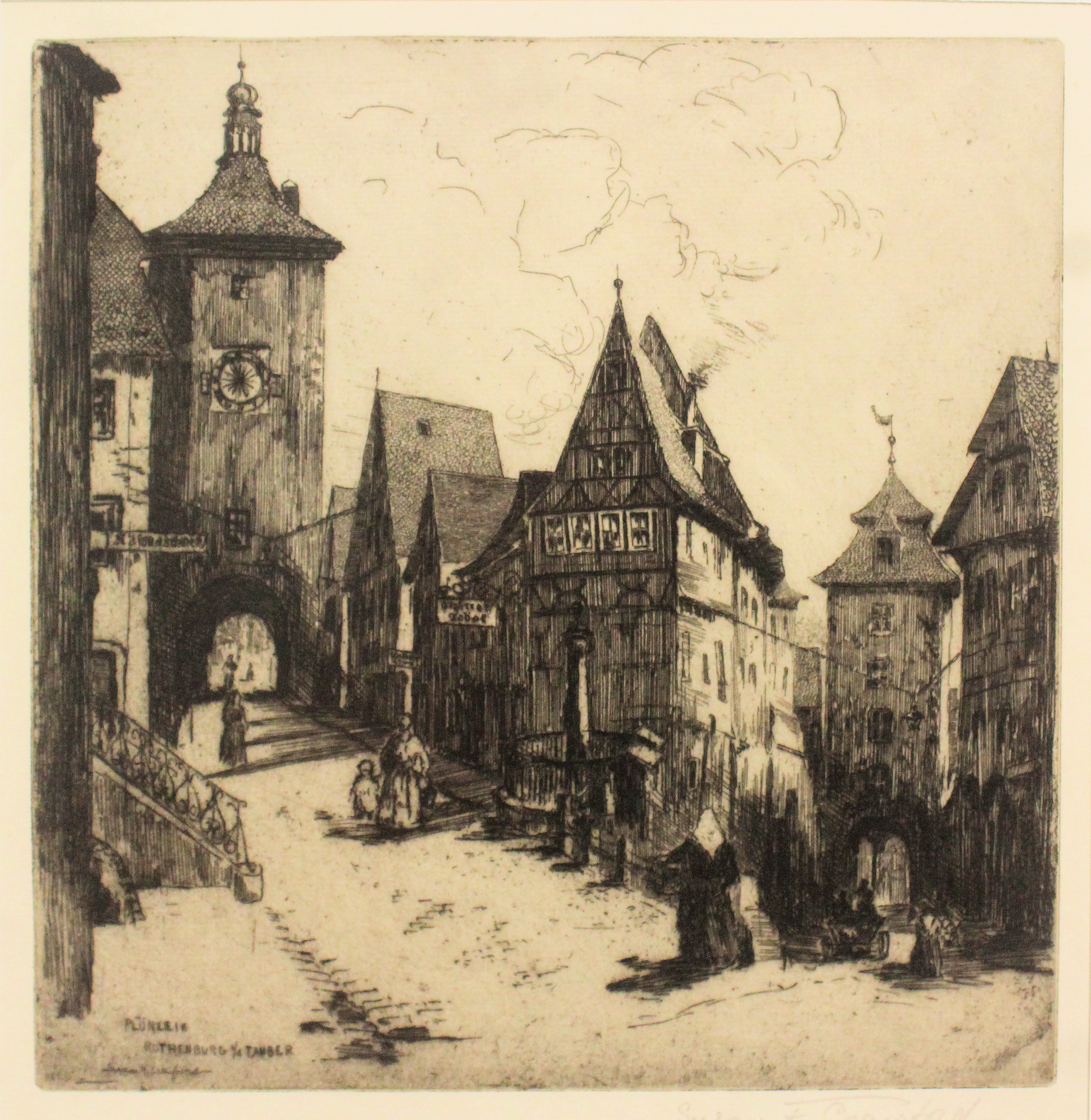
Das Plönlein

In 1894, etching was added to the curriculum of the Glasgow School of Art for the first time and Crawford was appointed as a teacher. Along with Crawford, Newbery appointed a number of women as teachers for the newly introduced craft subjects all of whom were ex-students, including Jessie M. King, Annie French, Jessie Newbery and Helen Muir Wood. Crawford's tenure teaching etching coincided with the Etching Revival, where artists sought to elevate the status of etching to a higher art form, representing the antithesis of mass-produced art such as engraving.

Crawford was an accomplished and prolific etcher, specialising in topographical scenes of Edinburgh, Glasgow and St Andrews. Her work was commended in The Studio Magazine for being "rich in suggestion". In 1893 she became a member of the Glasgow Society of Lady Artists, and a year later she was elected an Associate of the Royal Society of Painter-Etchers.

She shared her studio space in Glasgow with artists Louise Perman and Emma Watson. In 1918, Crawford resigned from her post at the Glasgow School of Art and was succeeded by James Hamilton Mackenzie, a former student of hers.

She exhibited widely, including with the Glasgow Society of Lady Artists, the Royal Glasgow Institute of the Fine Arts, the Royal Scottish Academy, the Royal Society of Painter-Etchers, The Society of Women Artists, and at the Brunton Galleries, London.

Her etchings are in a range of private and public collections including Glasgow Museums, National Galleries of Scotland (Edinburgh), the Hunterian Museum and Art Gallery (Glasgow), the British Museum, New York Public Library, and Sarjeant Gallery Te Whare o Rehua (Whanganui, New Zealand).
