= Birdston =

Coordinates: 55.952°N 04.159°W

Birdston: Scots: Birdstoun
- Location within East Dunbartonshire
- OS grid reference: NS6575
- Council area: East Dunbartonshire
- Country: Scotland
- Sovereign state: United Kingdom
- Post town: GLASGOW
- Postcode district: G66
- Police: Scotland
- Fire: Scottish
- Ambulance: Scottish
- UK Parliament: Cumbernauld, Kilsyth and Kirkintilloch East
- Scottish Parliament: Strathkelvin and Bearsden

Birdston is a hamlet located in East Dunbartonshire, Scotland between Milton of Campsie and Kirkintilloch. The 'Campsie poet' William Muir (1766-1817) was born in Birdston and is buried in the kirkyard there. A monument to him was erected in the kirkyard by admirers of his poems in 1857.
