= Mitani Goho =

Japanese netsuke carver

Mitani Gohō (五鳳 late 18th – early 19th century) was a Japanese netsuke carver from Aki Province.

According to collector Anne Hull Grundy, "The wooden netsuke of Goho are outstanding, even beside the carvings of other masters of the Iwami School. In fact, they have never been surpassed by any other carvers."
