= Kelvingrove Art Gallery and Museum =

Museum and art gallery in Glasgow, Scotland

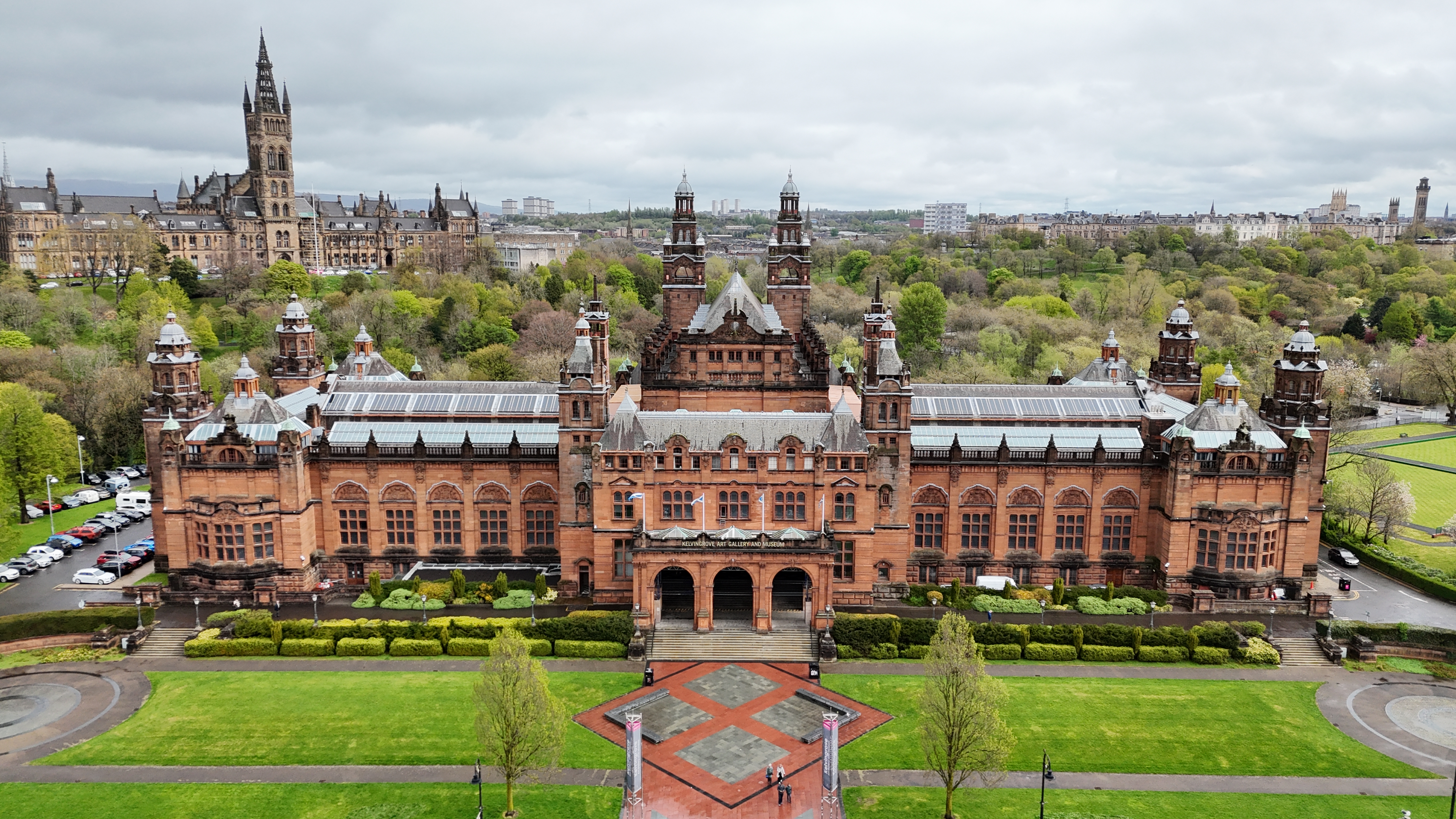
- Entrance on Argyle St

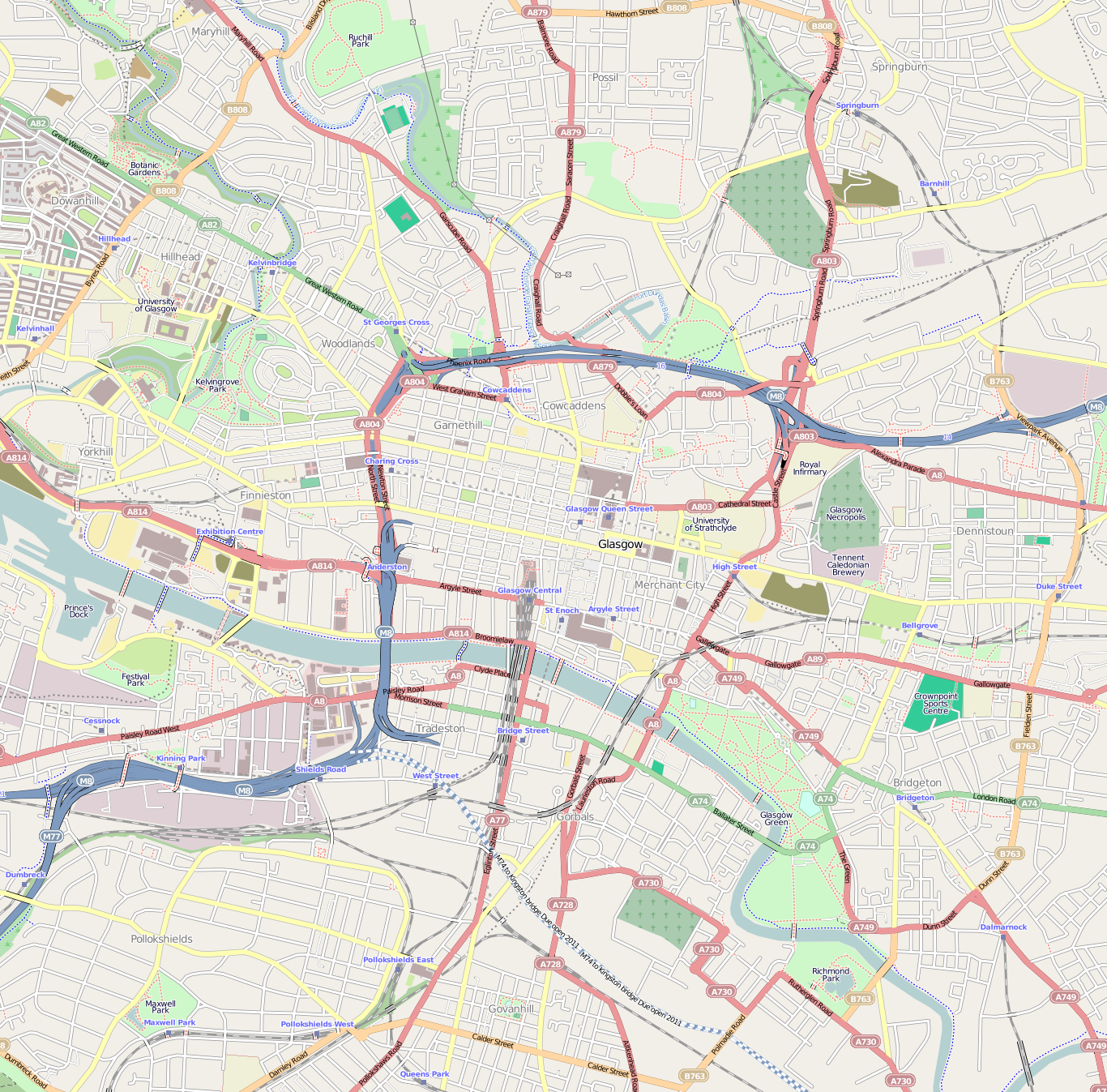
- Location within Central Glasgow
- Established: 1901; 125 years ago
- Location: Argyle Street, Yorkhill, Glasgow G3 8AG, Scotland, United Kingdom
- Coordinates: 55°52′07″N 4°17′26″W
- Key holdings: Christ of Saint John of the Cross
- Visitors: 1,219,831
- Public transit access: Kelvinhall
- Website: www.glasgowlife.org.uk/museums/venues/kelvingrove-art-gallery-and-museum

Listed Building – Category A
- Official name: Kelvingrove Park, Kelvingrove Art Gallery and Museum
- Designated: 15 December 1970
- Reference no.: LB33071

Kelvingrove Art Gallery and Museum owned by Glasgow City Council is a major art gallery and museum in the Yorkhill area of Glasgow, Scotland, managed by Glasgow Museums. It is located in Kelvingrove Park in the West End of the city. To its north is the University of Glasgow and to its south is the Kelvin Hall. It is adjacent to Argyle Street previously known as Dumbarton Road. Kelvingrove Art Gallery and Museum is one of Scotland's most popular buildings and free visitor attractions.

The art gallery and museum opened in 1901, as part of the Glasgow International Exhibition (1901), and fully opened to the public from 1 October 1902. The museum collections include natural history, Egyptian antiquities, design, architecture, medieval arms and armoury, Scottish history and the history of Glasgow. The art collections are one of Europe’s great civic art collections, including Scottish, European, African, Asian and Oceanic fine and decorative arts.

In 2006, Kelvingrove re-opened after a three-year, £27 million refurbishment and restoration, with the collections re-organised into two halves: Life and Expression. The Life galleries represent natural history, human history and prehistory. The Expression galleries include the fine art collections. The 22 galleries display over 8,000 objects. Notable exhibits include Salvador Dalí's Christ of St John of the Cross, Sir Roger the Asian elephant, the Avant armour, and paintings by the Glasgow Boys and the Scottish Colourists.

== Original museum and galleries ==
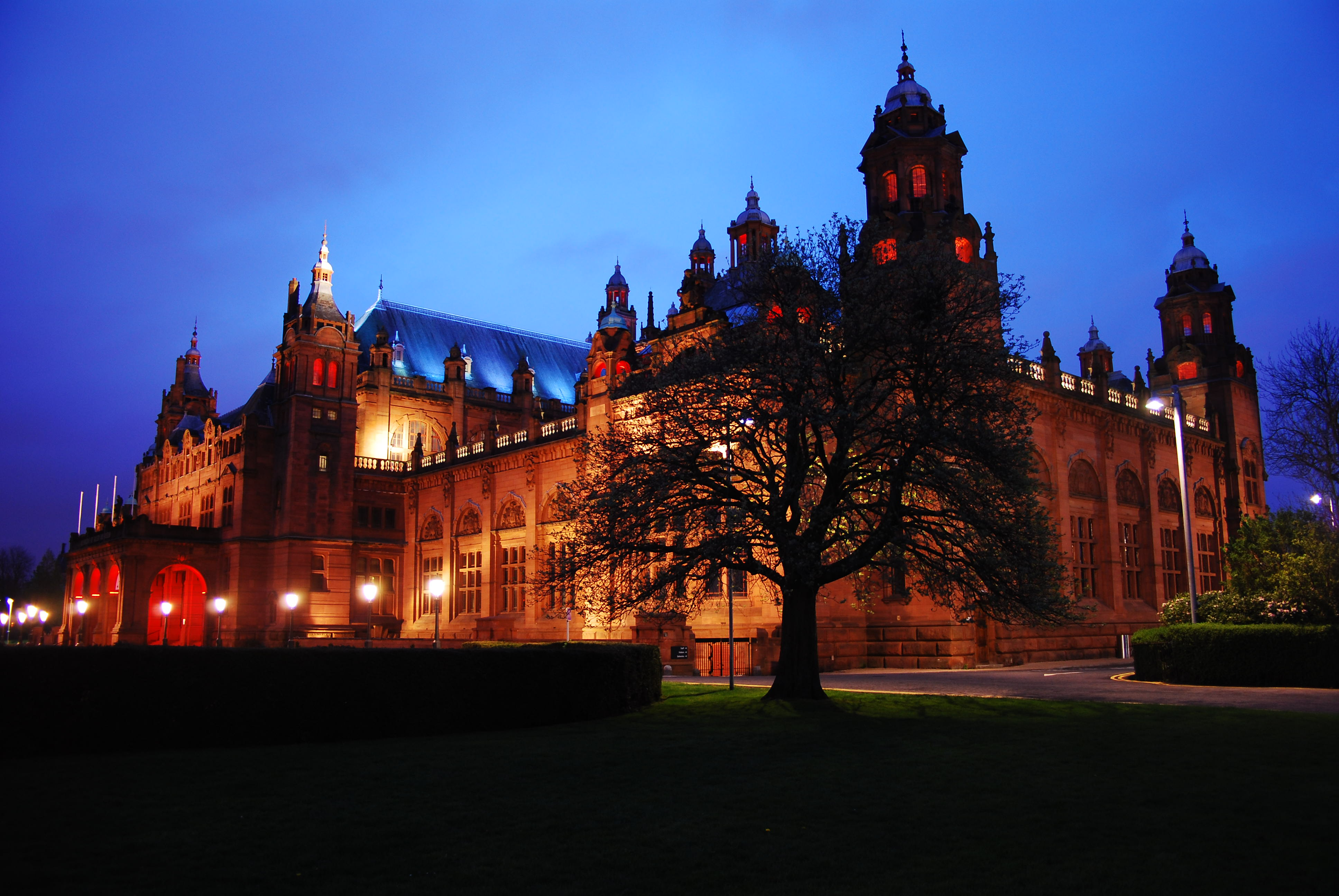
South elevation looking westwards from Argyle Street

A Kelvingrove Museum opened in 1870 as the City Industrial Museum. The city had already obtained its first municipal Art galleries in 1856 thanks to Archibald McLellan and the McLellan Galleries. The industrial museum was housed in Kelvingrove House, a mansion which was built in 1783 and was originally the home of Lord Provost Patrick Colquhoun. Kelvingrove House stood to the east of the present art gallery museum, on the site now occupied by Kelvingrove Park's skatepark. The Kelvingrove Museum's growing collection led to a new wing being added to the house between 1874 and 1876. The original Kelvingrove House was demolished in 1899, with the museum wing being demolished in 1911.

The city's Fine Art collections and sculptures had come together in the McLellan Galleries - known then as the Corporation Galleries - in the city-centre's Sauchiehall Street. These Galleries had been first extended in 1876, and were becoming too small to house the growing number of art works. Glasgow Corporation appointed its first museum Superintendent James Orr in 1876 to take charge of its renowned collections and also take charge of the small industrial museum in the park. He advocated that the two elements should be brought together and a new purpose-built venue be established.

== Creation (1888–1901) ==
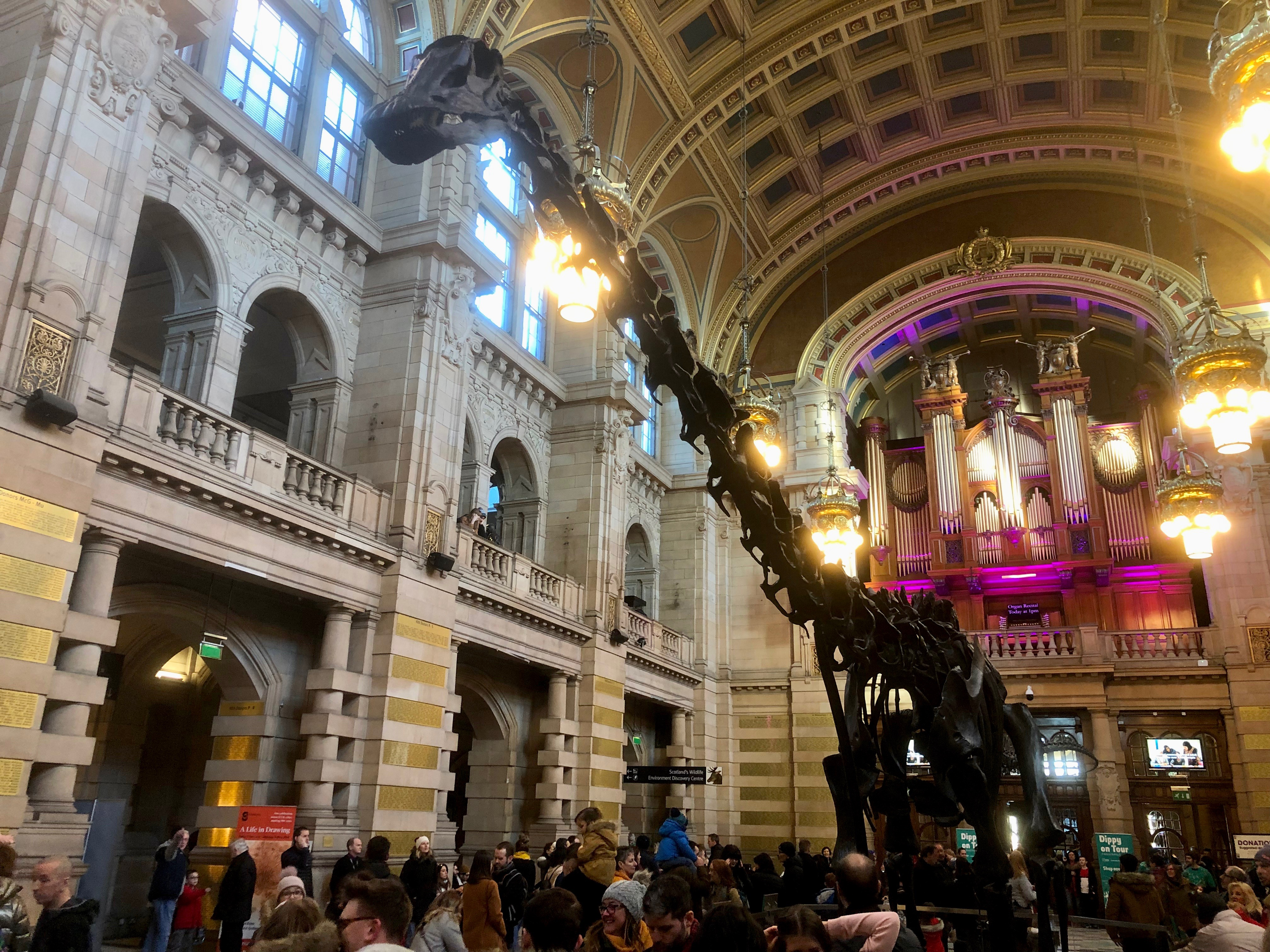
The Centre Hall, looking towards the Pipe Organ flanked by original electroliers, with Dippy the Diplodocus on tour January–May 2019

The construction of Kelvingrove was partly financed by the proceeds of the 1888 International Exhibition held in Kelvingrove Park. The gallery was designed by Sir John W. Simpson and E.J. Milner Allen, and opened in 1901 as the Palace of Fine Arts for the Glasgow International Exhibition held in that year. It is built in a Spanish Baroque style, and follows the Glasgow tradition of stonework; using Locharbriggs red sandstone, externally, and on this occasion Giffnock white sandstone internally; both sets of quarries operated by Baird & Stevenson Ltd. The foundations were constructed by Morrison & Mason Ltd who also built the new Glasgow City Chambers, the GPO also in George Square, the Stock Exchange in Buchanan Street and much more. The immense building includes an entire program of architectural sculpture by George Frampton, William Shirreffs, Francis Derwent Wood and other sculptors.

The centrepiece of the Centre Hall is a concert pipe organ constructed and installed by Lewis & Co. The organ was originally commissioned as part of the Glasgow International Exhibition, held in Kelvingrove Park in 1901. The organ was installed in the concert hall of the exhibition, which was capable of seating 3,000 people. The Centre Hall of the then newly completed Art Gallery and Museum was intended from the beginning to be a space in which to hold concerts. When the 1901 exhibition ended, a Councillor urged the Glasgow Corporation (now Glasgow Council) to purchase the organ, stating that without it, "the art gallery would be a body without a soul". Purchase price and installation costs were met from the surplus exhibition proceeds, and the organ was installed in the Centre Hall by Lewis and Co. The present case front in walnut with non-functional display pipes was commissioned at this time from John W. Simpson. Simpson was the senior partner of Simpson & Milner Allen, architects of the gallery building.

There is an urban myth in Glasgow that the building was accidentally built back-to-front, and the architect jumped from one of the towers in despair upon realising his mistake. In reality, the grand entrance was always intended to face into Kelvingrove Park.

== Refurbishment (2003–2006) ==
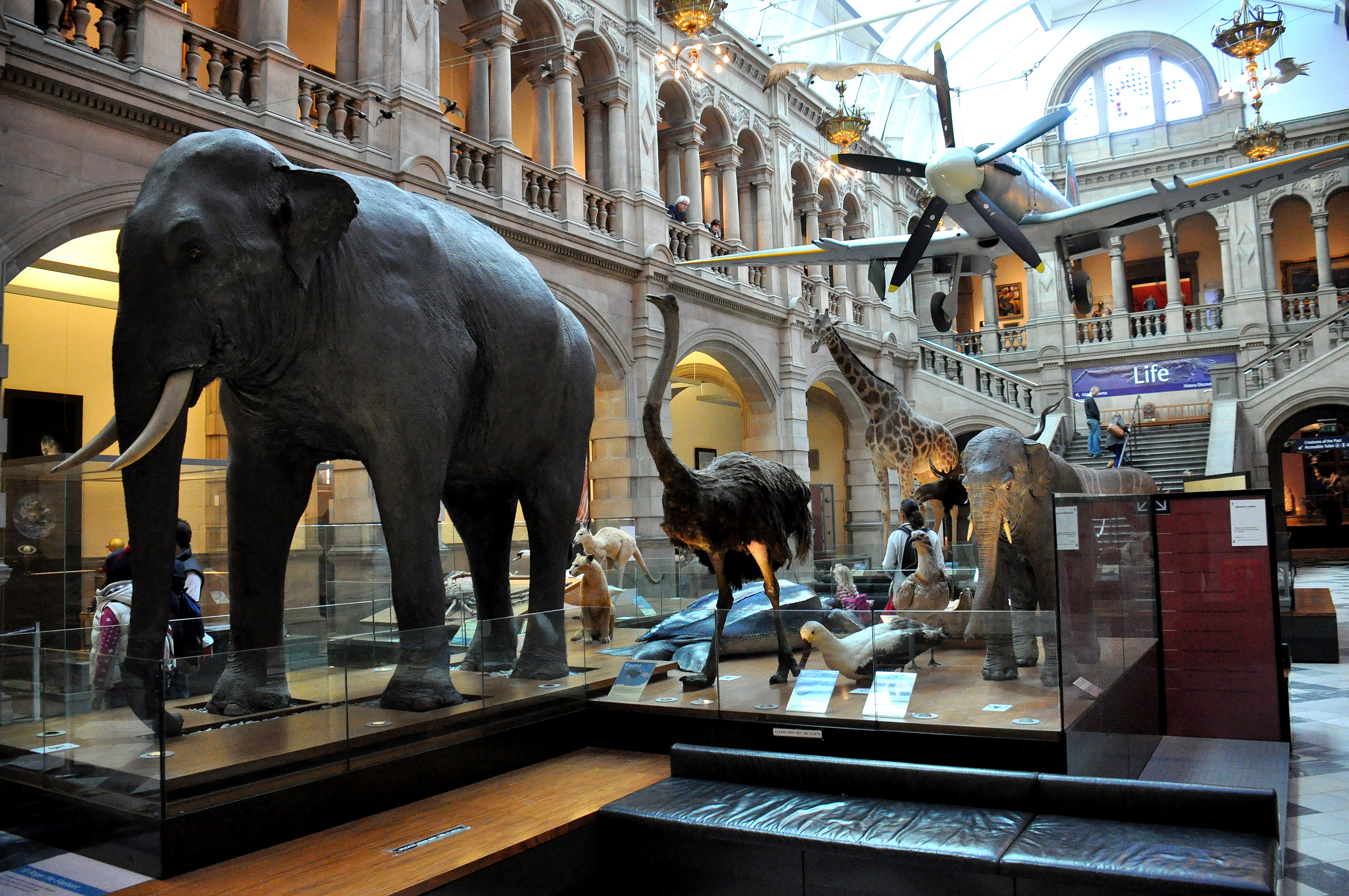
West Court; animals on display below a preserved Spitfire Mark 21 which served from 1947 to 1949 with 602 (City of Glasgow) Squadron of the Royal Auxiliary Air Force

Kelvingrove was reopened by Queen Elizabeth II on 11 July 2006 after a three-year closure for major refurbishment and restoration. (In that period the McLellan Galleries in the city-centre were used to display many of its collections.) The work, which cost around £35 million, was one-third funded by the Heritage Lottery Fund and one-third by public donations to the appeal and included a new restaurant and a large basement extension to its display space to accommodate the 8,000 exhibits now on display. A new layout and wayfinding scheme was introduced to make the building more visitor-friendly, which was designed and executed by London-based museum design company, Event Communications. As part of the renovations a Spitfire (serial LA198) that had previously been operated by the No. 602 Squadron RAF (City of Glasgow) was hung from the ceiling above the life gallery.

Immediately after its 2003–2006 refurbishment, the museum was the most popular free-to-enter visitor attraction in Scotland, recording 2.23 million visitors in 2007. These numbers made it the most visited museum in the United Kingdom outside London that year. From 2006 to 2009 the museum had 5 million visitors.

== Collections ==
The museum's collections came mainly from the original Kelvingrove Museum in the park and the McLellan Galleries in Sauchiehall Street. It has one of the finest collections of arms and armour in the world and a vast natural history collection. The art collection includes many outstanding European artworks, including works by the Old Masters (Francesco Vecellio's Madonna and Child with Saint Jerome and Saint Dorothy, Rembrandt van Rijn, Gerard de Lairesse, and Jozef Israëls), French Impressionists (such as Claude Monet, Pierre-Auguste Renoir, Camille Pissarro, Vincent van Gogh and Mary Cassatt), Dutch Renaissance, Scottish Colourists and exponents of the Glasgow School.

The museum houses Christ of Saint John of the Cross by Salvador Dalí. The copyright of this painting was bought by the curator at the time after a meeting with Dalí. Between 1993 and 2006, the painting was moved to the St Mungo Museum of Religious Life and Art.

The museum also contains a large gift of the decorative arts from Anne Hull Grundy, an art collector and philanthropist, covering the history of European jewellery in the 18th and 19th centuries.

== Gallery ==
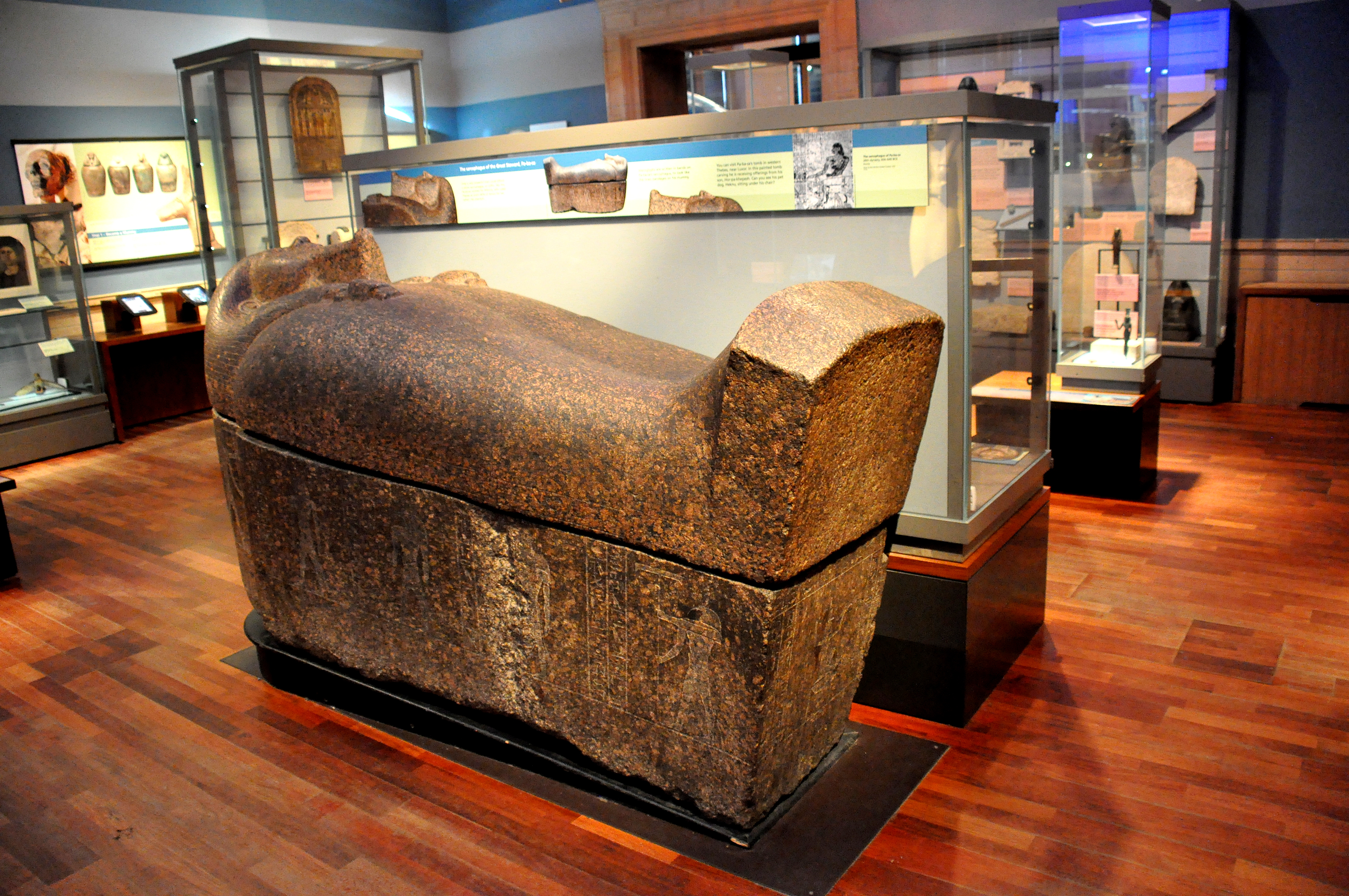
Sarcophagus of Pabasa.

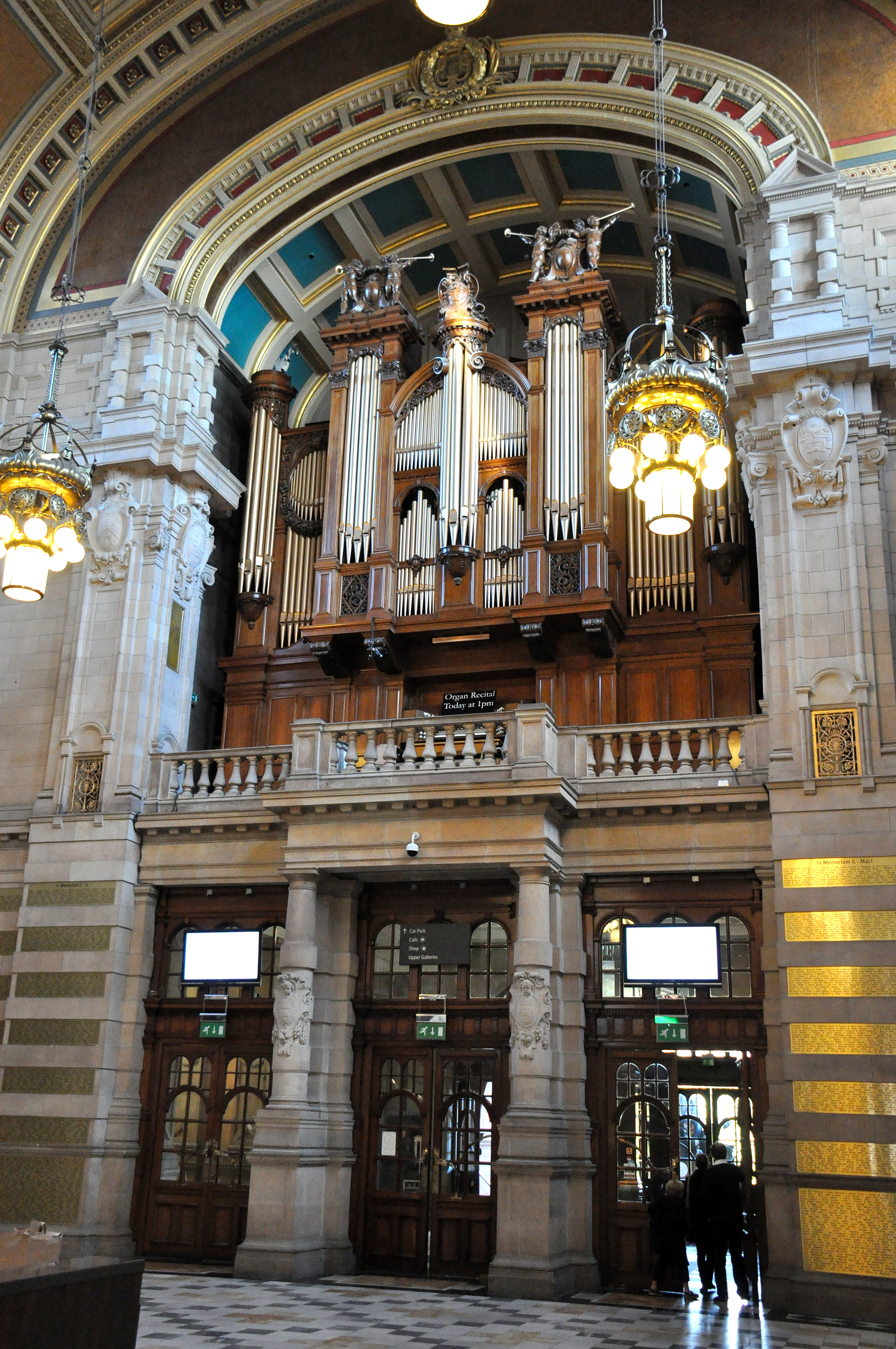
Pipe organ built by Lewis & Co, 1901

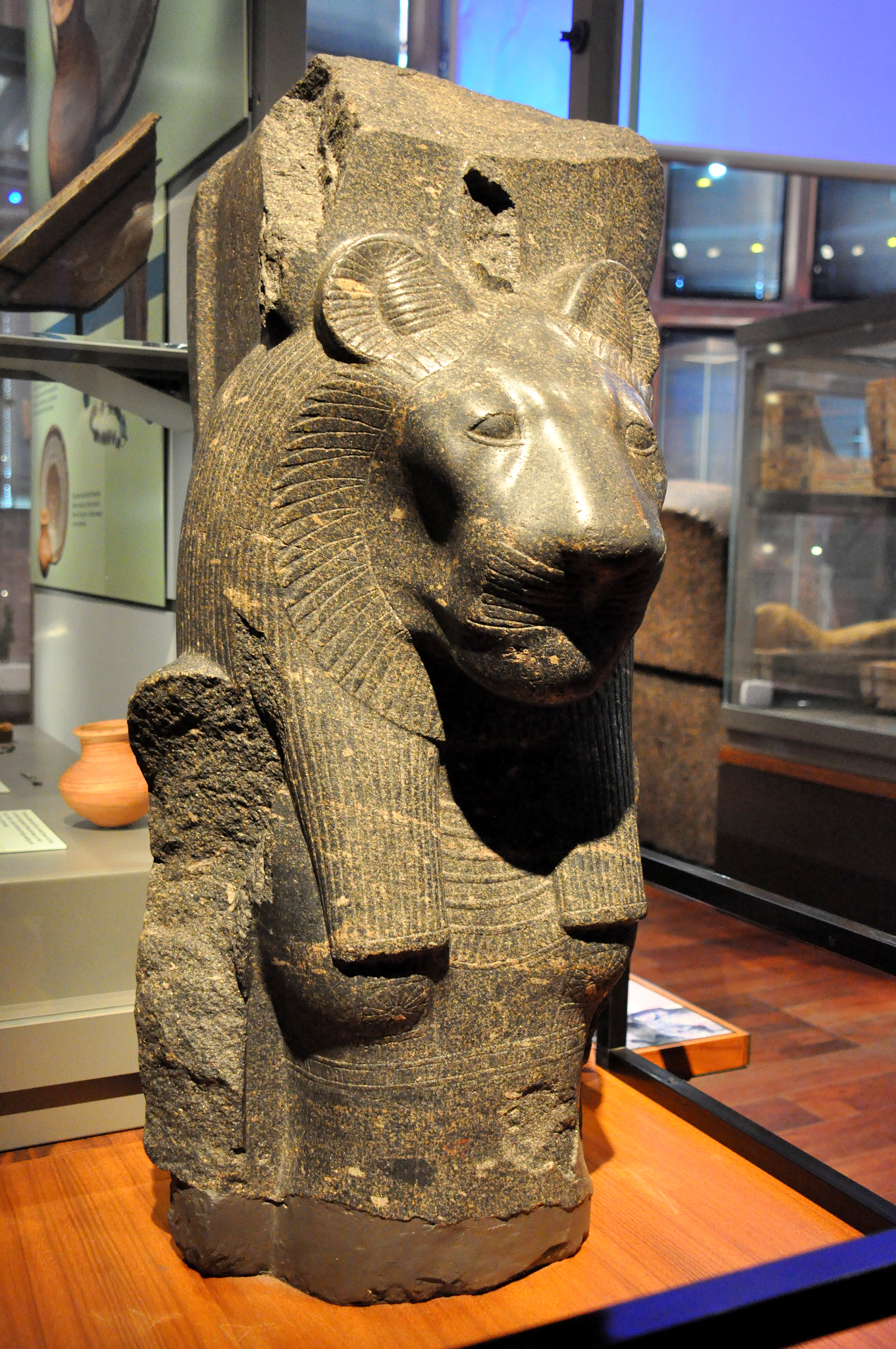
Head and upper body of the goddess Sekhmet, Egypt, 18th dynasty, reign of Amenhotep III, 1390-1352 BCE

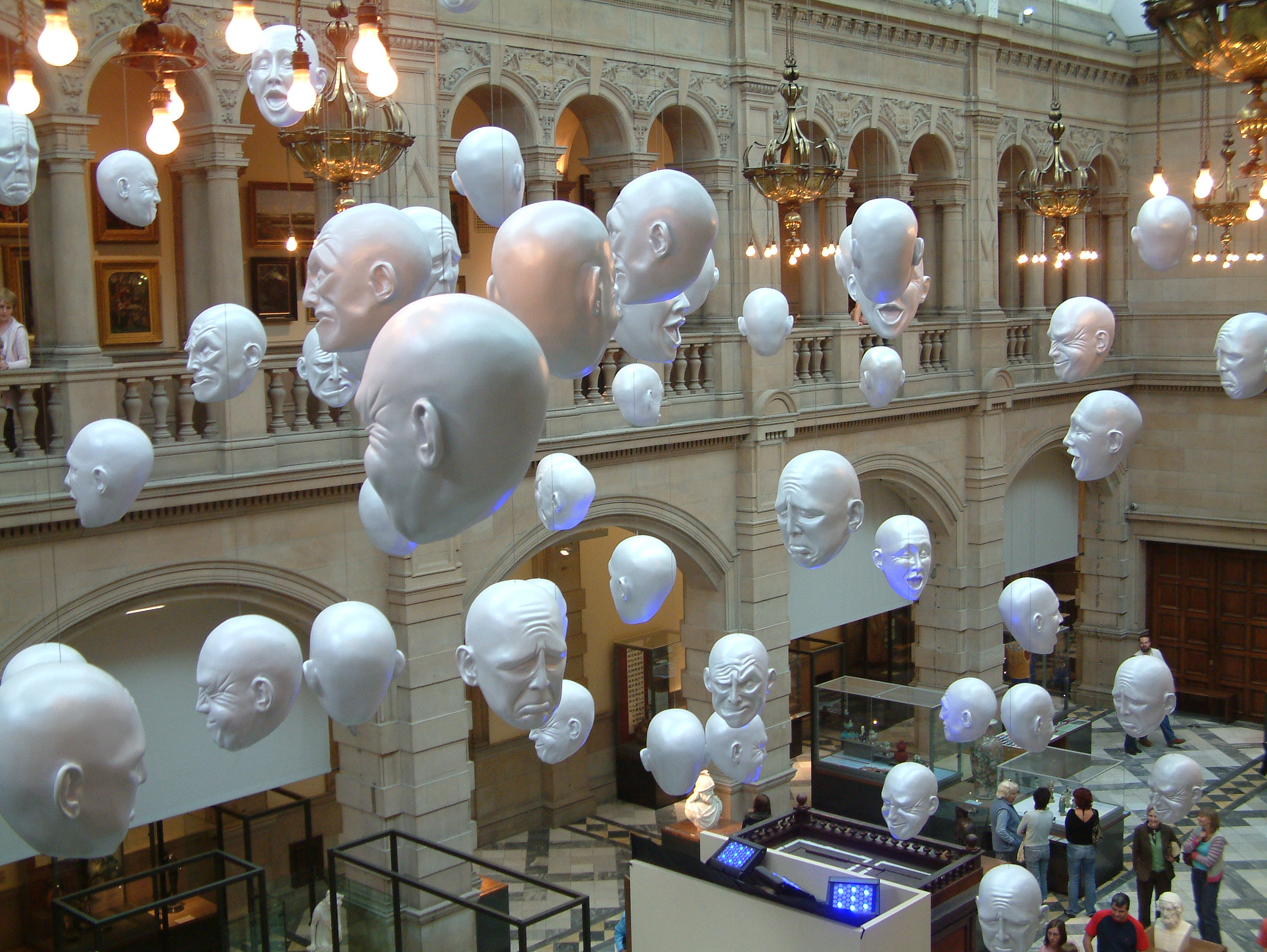
The Floating Heads by Sophie Cave, 2006, in the East Court
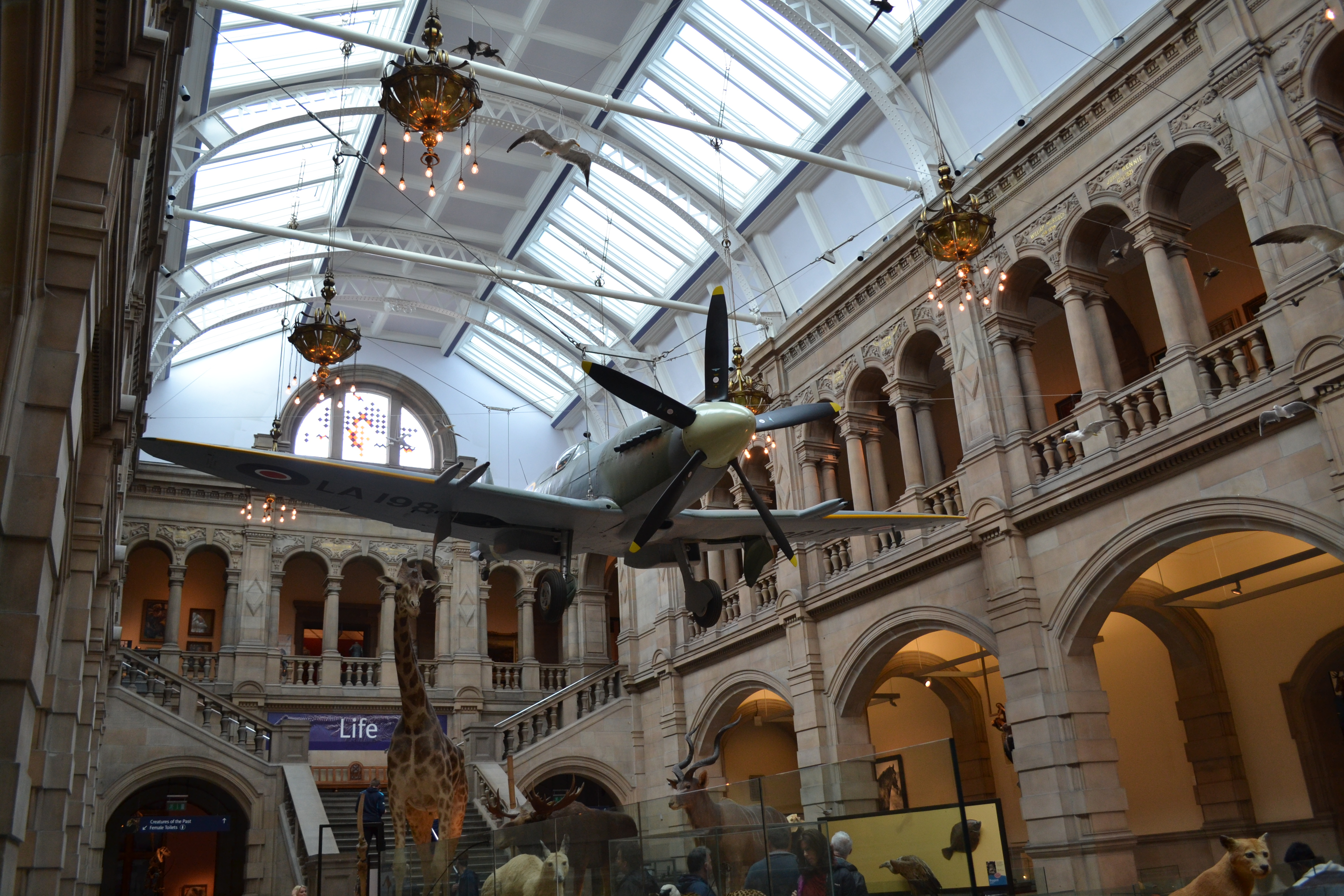
Spitfire F.21 LA198 of 602 (City of Glasgow) Squadron, in the West Court

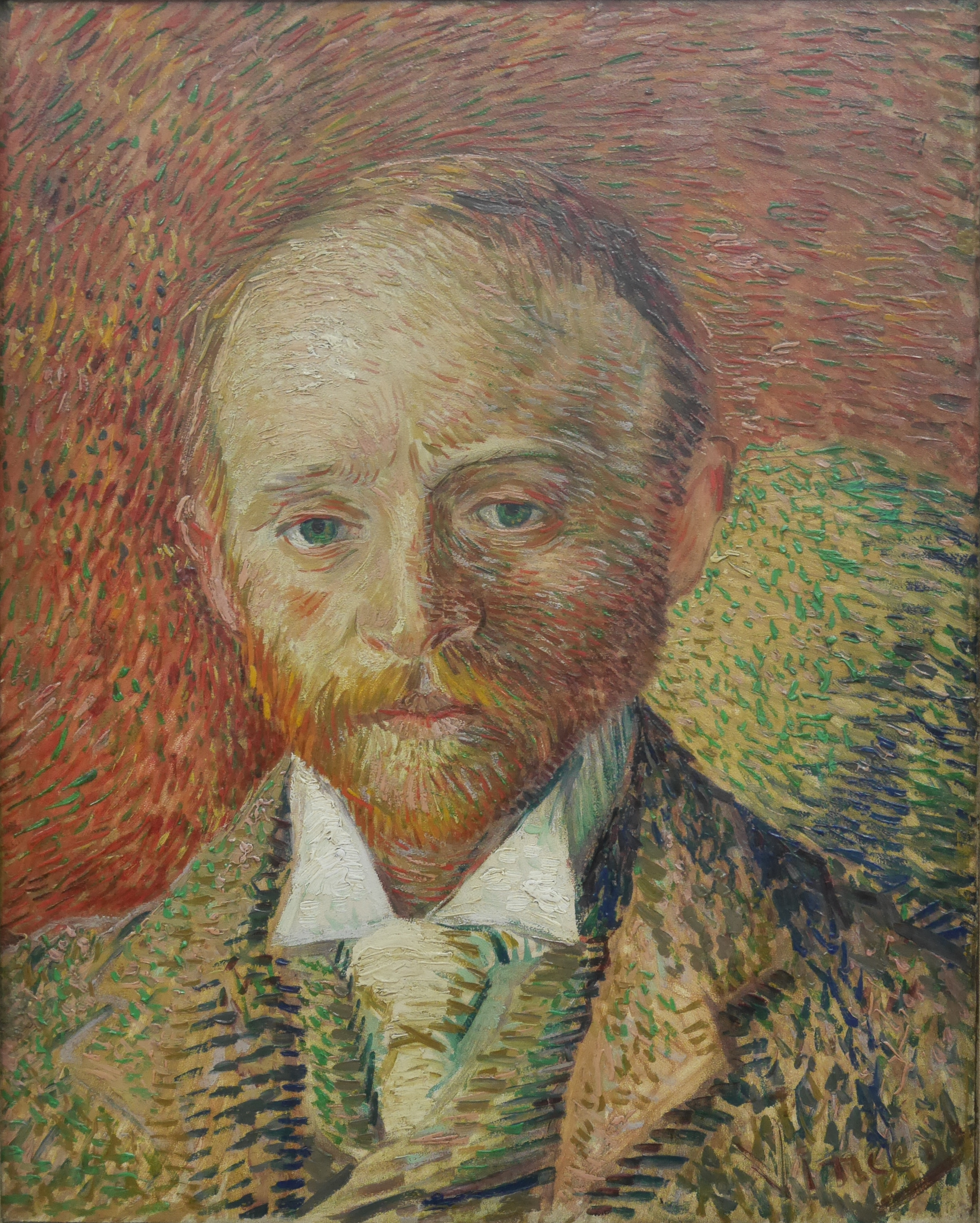
Portrait of the Art Dealer Alexander Reid by Vincent van Gogh, 1887

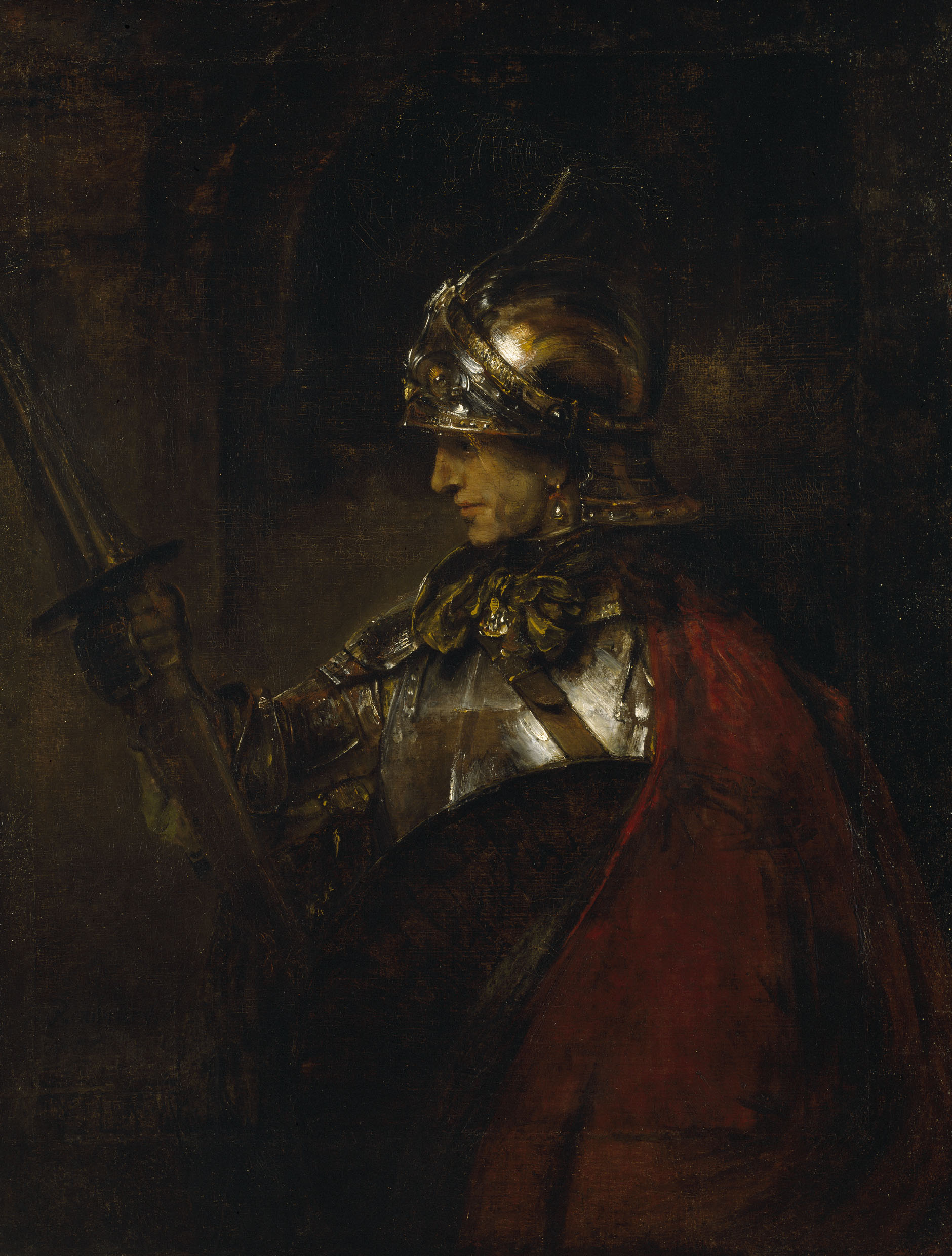
A Man in Armour by Rembrandt, 1655 (?)

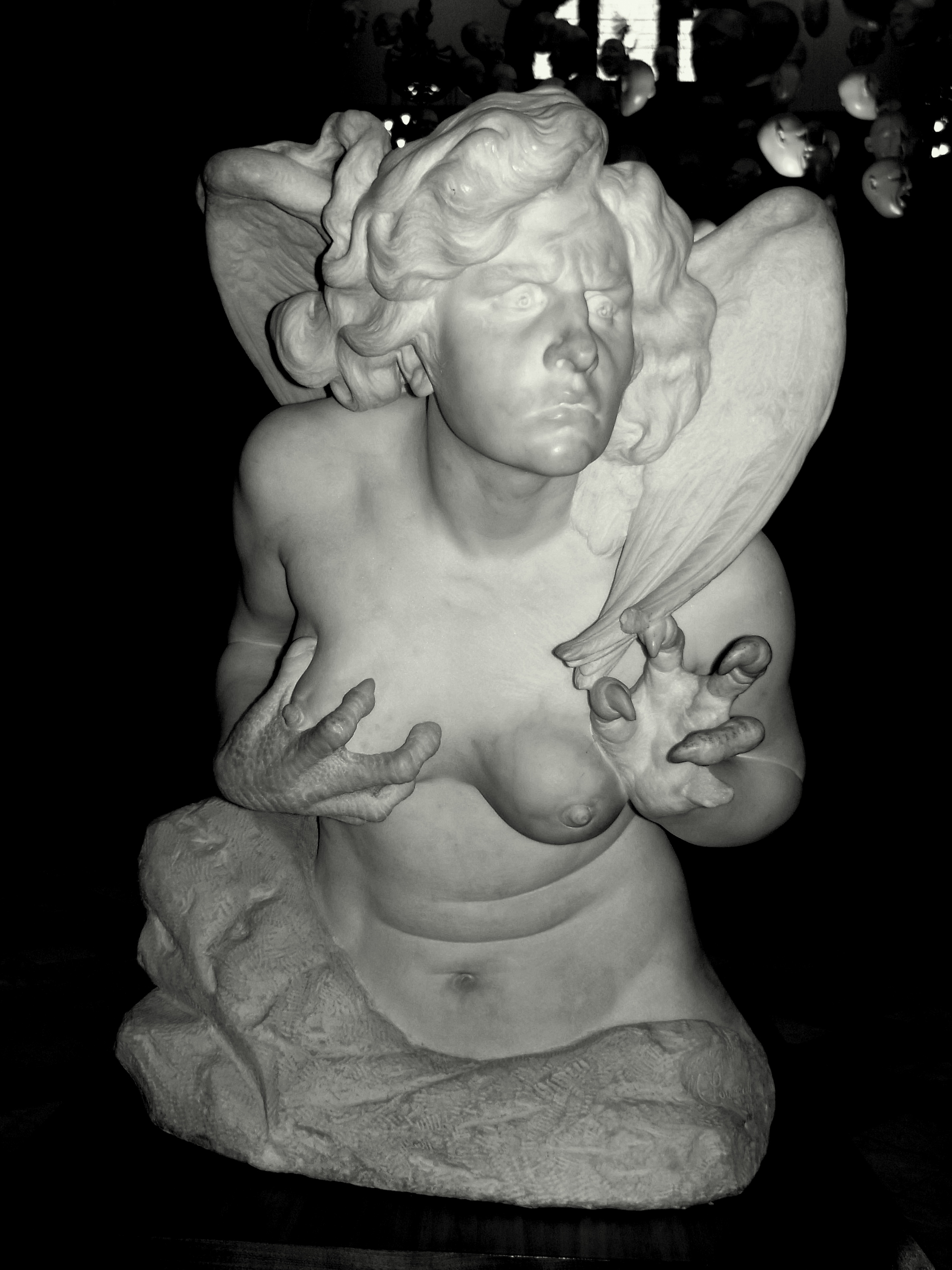
Mary Pownall - The Harpy Celaeno, 1902

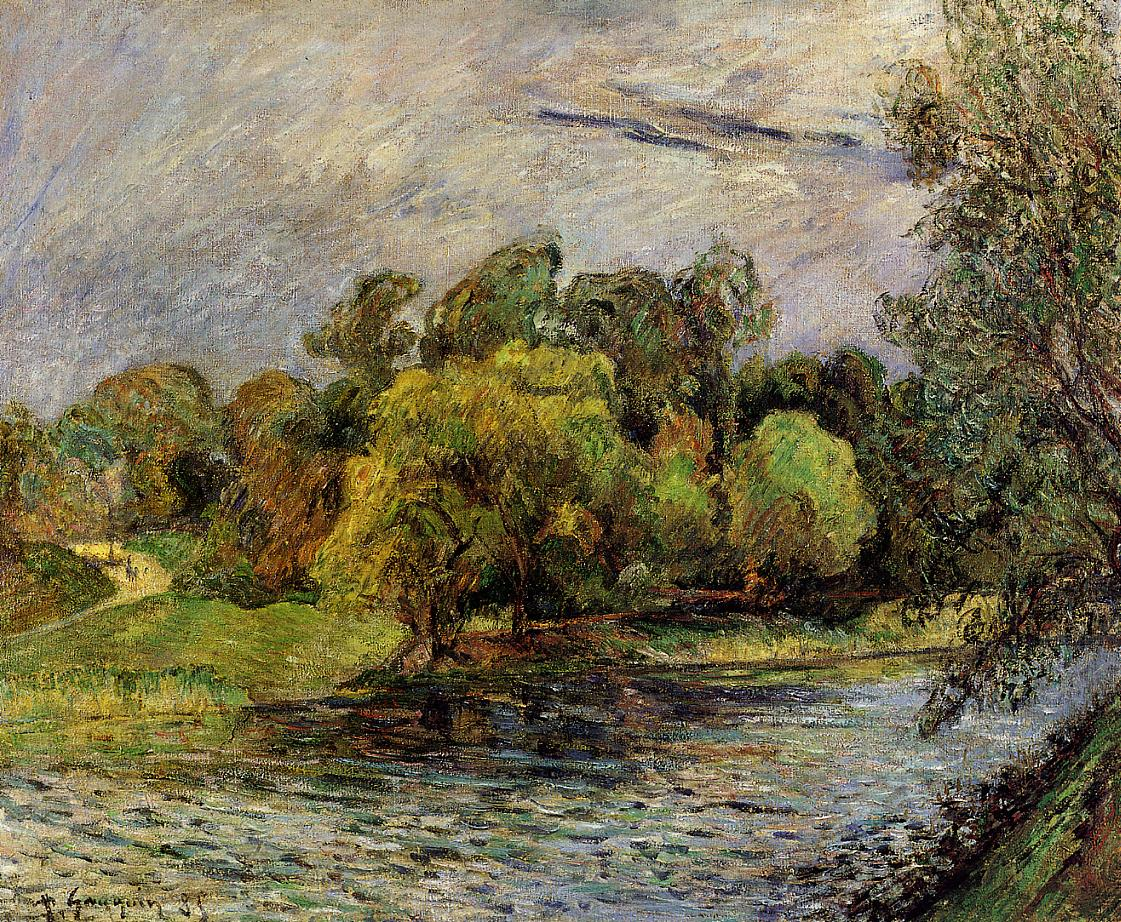
Paul Gauguin, Østre Anlæg Park, Copenhagen, 1885
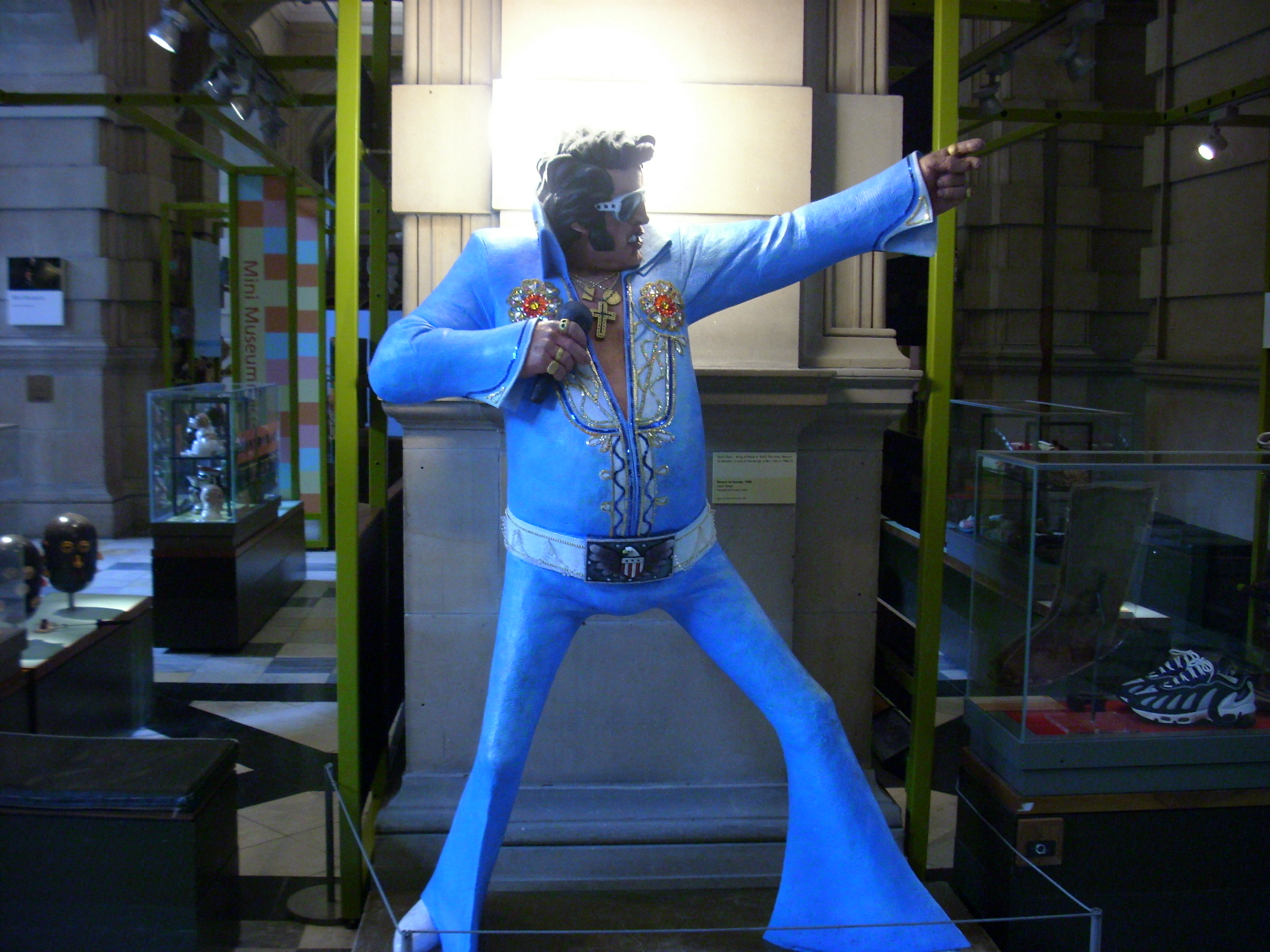
Return to Sender by Sean Reed, 1996

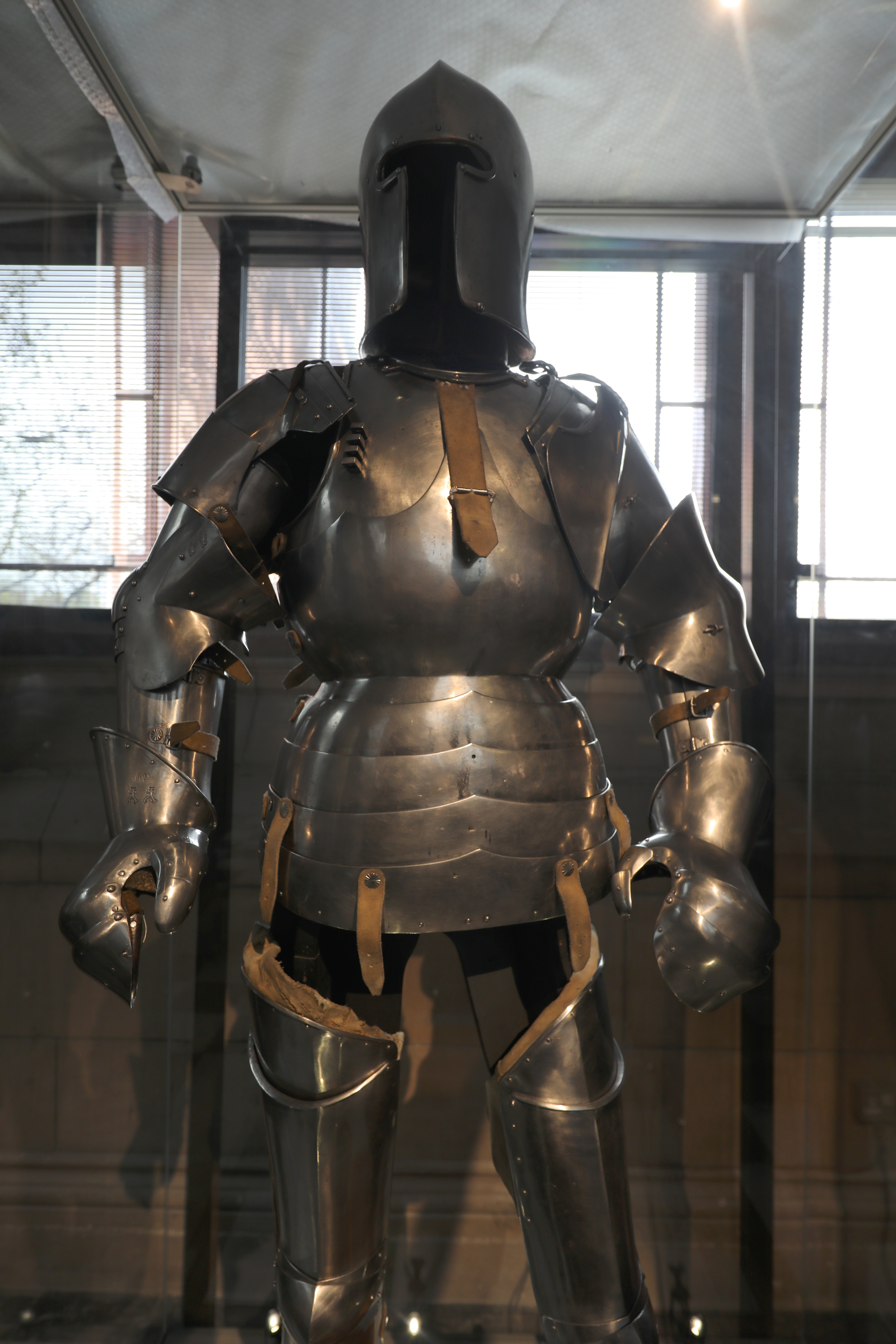
The Avant Armour, c. 1440-1445

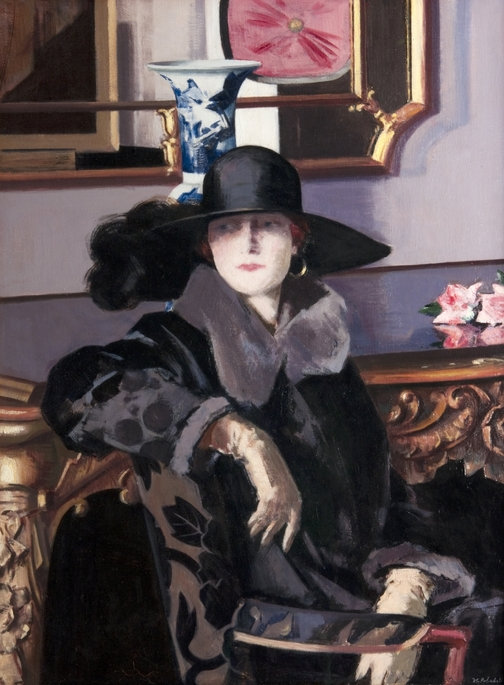
A Lady in Black by Francis Cadell, c. 1926

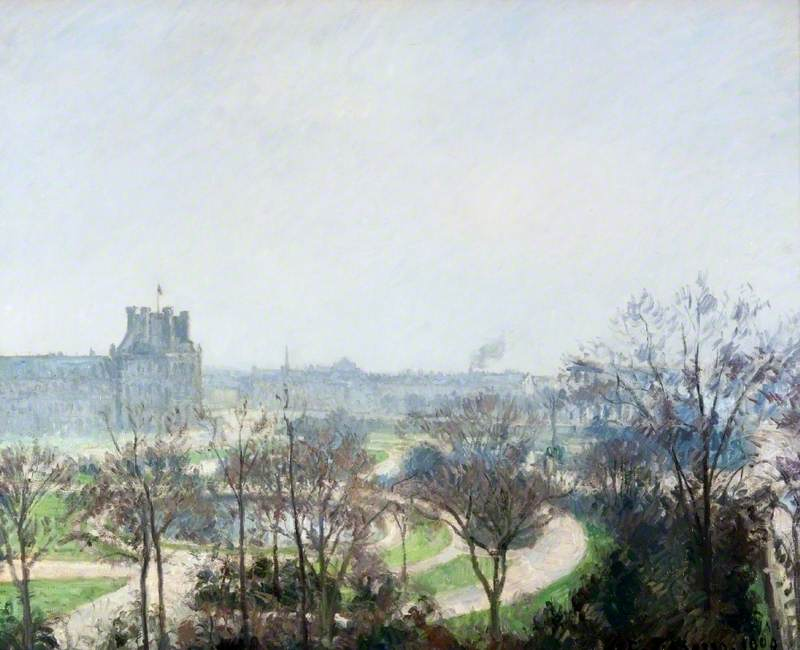
The Tuileries Gardens, Paris by Camille Pissarro, 1900
