= Kelvingrove House =

Demolished mansion in Glasgow, Scotland

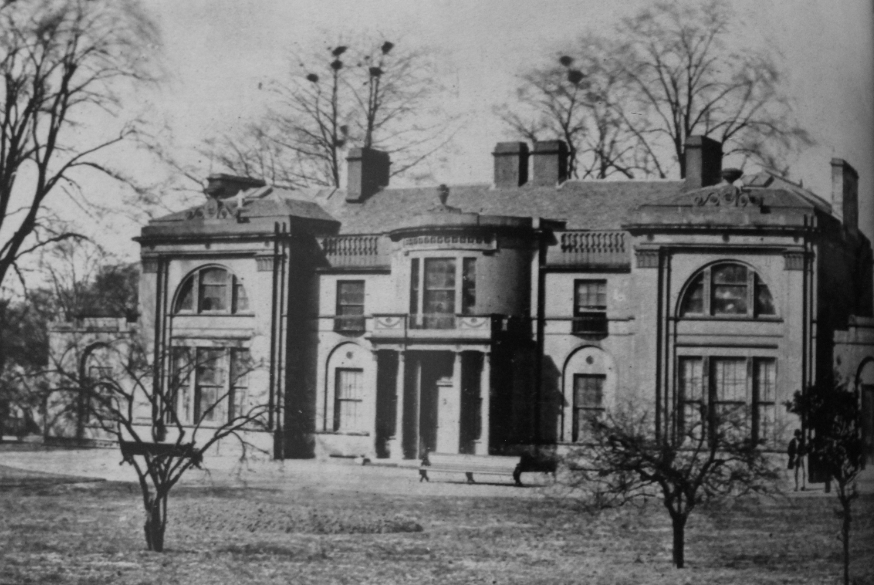
Kelvingrove House pictured by Thomas Annan in 1870

Kelvingrove House was a substantial mansion in north-west Glasgow, Scotland. The house now gives its name to an entire district of the city, and a major park.

== History ==
The land was previously known as Nether Newton, a 12-acre (4.9 ha) site and house owned by the Wotherspoon family.

The site, which sits on the south bank of a bend in the River Kelvin, was purchased in 1782 by Patrick Colquhoun, in the year which he became Lord Provost of Glasgow. The site was around a mile from the city centre. He built a new house there in 1782 and renamed it "Kelvingrove". He was forced to sell the house in 1790 as his business took him away from Glasgow and permanently to London. Although often claimed to be the design of Robert Adam, there was no evidence to support this and stylistically the close was closer to his brother John Adam or the Glasgow architect David Hamilton.

The house, with eight bedrooms and at least three public rooms, had a picturesque view of the river to the north and a panorama of the Glasgow skyline to the south. It was purchased in 1792 by John Pattison (1744–1820), a Glasgow manufacturer. In 1806 the house passed to Richard Dennistoun of Dennistoun, Bryce & Co. whose family occupied the house until 1841 after it passed to his son William Dennistoun.

It was briefly owned by a Colin McNaughtan (who never lived in the house) before being purchased by the City of Glasgow around 1845 largely to utilise the 12 acres (4.9 ha) of ground as parkland. In 1874 the house was extended greatly on its south side by architect John Carrick and converted into a museum, mainly under the efforts of Bailie Hugh MacBean. This museum opened in 1876.

In 1888 a temporary but large exhibition, the 1888 International Exhibition, was held in the grounds to gauge public demand for a larger facility. If anything, this highlighted the inadequacy of Kelvingrove House as a museum, and as it now stood in a public park, limited its alternative uses. The profit from the 1888 exhibition (£46,000) was sufficient to fund a major new facility.

The city resolved to build a far larger museum and art gallery. Although clearly of exceptional quality, the lack of connection to Robert Adam was further used as an excuse to demolish the building. The majority of the house (exempting the museum wing) was demolished in 1899 with the residual element being demolished, as redundant, after the opening of the Kelvingrove Art Gallery and Museum (to the south of the house) in 1902.
