= Kanman =

Japanese netsuke carver

Kanman (貫満 1793 – 1859) was a Japanese netsuke carver of the Iwami school (founded by Seiyōdō Tomiharu).

Most of his work was designed in the first three decades of the 19th century. According to collector Anne Hull Grundy, "His netsuke [...] are extremely rare."

In the historical kana orthography he was spelled "Kwanman" (くゎんまん). It can also be pronounced as "Tsuramitsu" (貫満). He is also known to sign as "(Iwami-no-)Kuni" (石見国).

== Bibliography ==
- Earle, Huthart, p. 270, no. 239.
- Lazarnick, NIA, p. 590.
- Rokusho 20, p. 50, no. 63.
- Earle, Huthart, p. 280, no. 249.
- Burditt, ICK, p. 51, figs. 8a-8b.
- Rokusho 20, p. 45, no. 54.
- Earle, Huthart, p. 262, no. 231.
