= Patrick Colquhoun =

Scottish merchant, statistician, and magistrate (1745–1820)

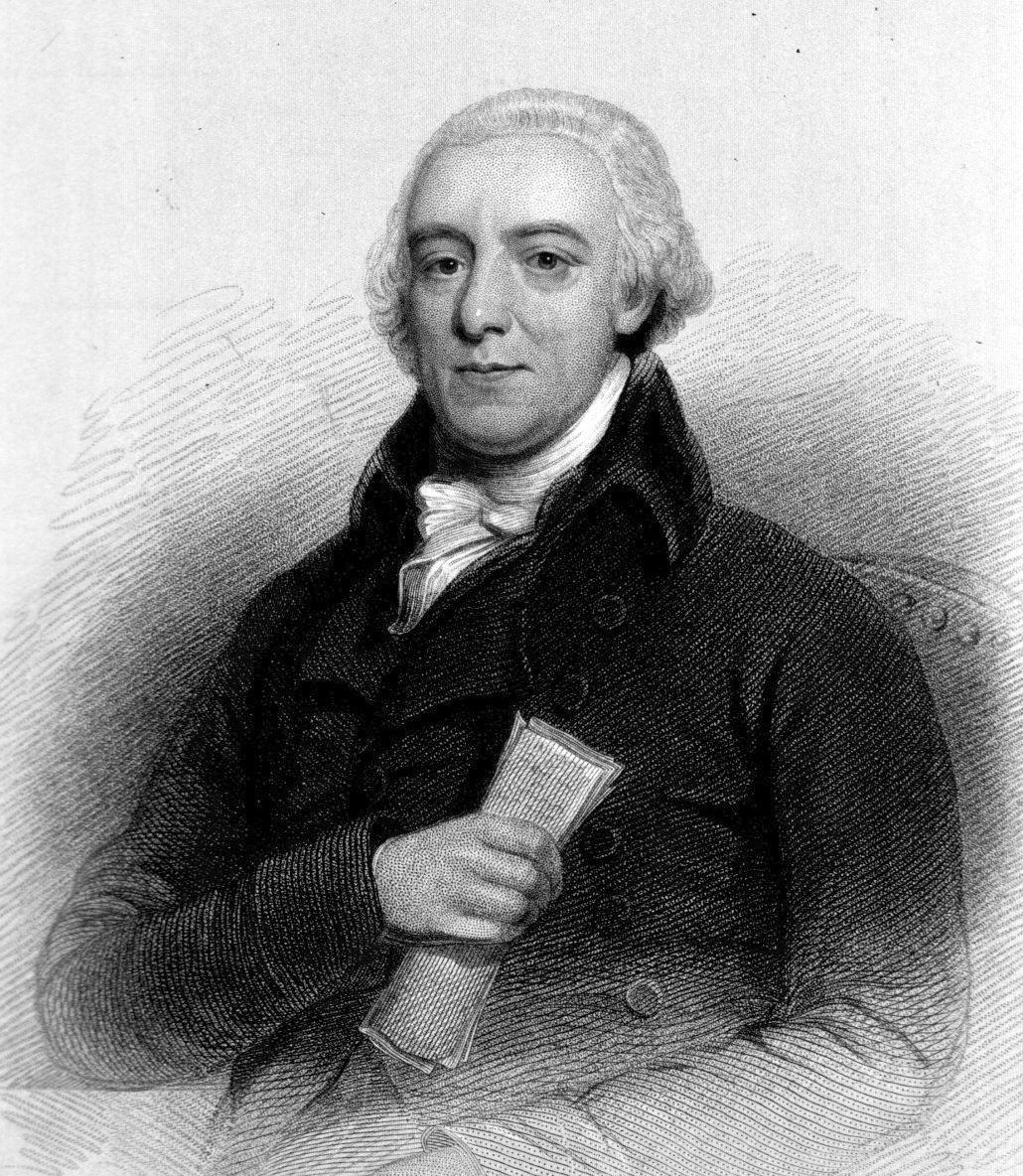
Patrick Colquhoun

Patrick Colquhoun (/kəˈhuːn/ kə-HOON; 14 March 1745 – 25 April 1820) was a Scottish merchant, statistician, magistrate, and founder of the first regular preventive police force in England, the Thames River Police. He also served as Lord Provost of Glasgow 1782 to 1784.

== Early life ==
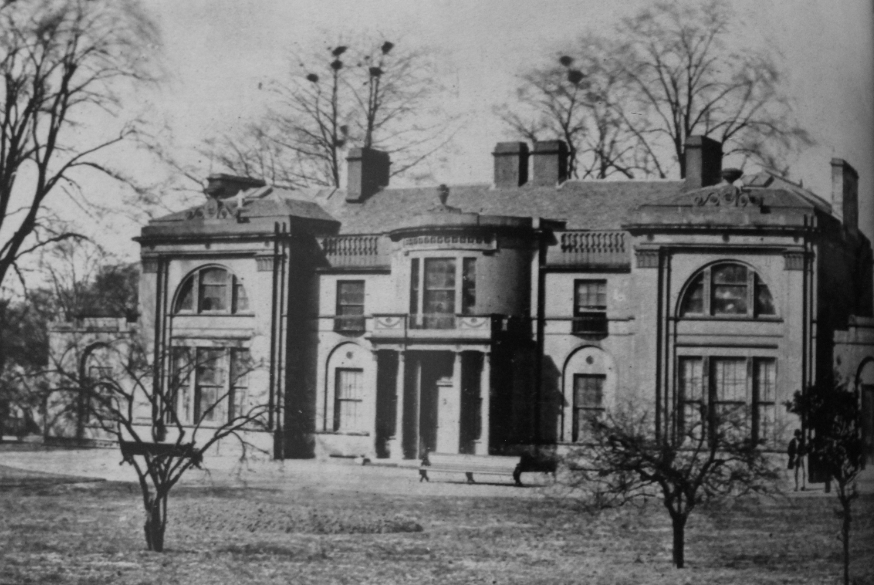
Kelvingrove House pictured by Thomas Annan in 1870

Colquhoun, a descendant of the Scottish Clan Colquhoun of Luss, was born in Dumbarton in 1745. Orphaned at the age of 16, his relatives sent him to America, setting him up in the lucrative commercial trade in Virginia. In 1766, the 21-year-old Colquhoun returned to Scotland, settling in Glasgow and going into business on his own in the linen trade. Ten years later, with the outbreak of the American Revolution, Colquhoun sided against the rebels and, along with 13 other local businessmen, funded a Glasgow regiment to contribute to the government's war effort.

In 1782 he purchased an estate in the West End (now part of Kelvingrove Park; and built the mansion house, Kelvingrove House (which became the first Kelvingrove Museum in 1875). On 22 July 1775, he married his cousin Janet, the daughter of James Colquhoun, the Provost of Dumbarton. Between 1782 and 1784, Patrick Colquhoun himself served as the Lord Provost of Glasgow. He also founded the Glasgow Chamber of Commerce and Manufacturing during that time, and made himself the first chairman.

In 1787 he is listed on the Committee for the Management of Forth and Clyde Navigation and in the West India Club. He was also Chairman of the Glasgow Tontine.

He was awarded an honorary LL.D. by the University of Glasgow in 1797. In Glasgow he lived in a second floor flat in an ancient tenement on Argyle Street.

Colquhoun was an avid statistician, and collected economic data. He used this information to lobby the government on behalf of the country's industries, particularly cotton and muslin. His findings formed the basis of numerous pamphlets and treatises that he wrote promoting legal reform and business generally. On one occasion, he travelled to Manchester and compiled statistics on the cotton trade. He presented his findings to Prime Minister William Pitt in 1789, but they were not acted upon because of the war with France. These activities brought Colquhoun increasingly into contact with the political sphere and to the attention of government and in 1785 he moved to London to seek a government position, and was appointed Magistrate in the East End.

== River Police ==
By the end of the eighteenth century, merchants from the British Empire's colonies were losing an estimated £500,000 worth of stolen cargo annually from the Pool of London on the River Thames. In 1796 Colquhoun's published A treatise on the police of metropolis and two years later, in collaboration with Justice of the Peace and master mariner John Harriott and utilitarian philosopher Jeremy Bentham, he wrote a letter to the London Society of West India Planters and Merchants proposing "the Establishment of a marine Police Office for the prevention of River Plunder". The West India Planters Committees and the West India Merchants agreed to fund a one-year trial and on 2 July 1798, after receiving government permission, the Thames River Police began operating with Colquhoun as Superintending Magistrate and Harriott the Resident Magistrate.

With an initial investment of £4,200, the new force began with about 50 men charged with policing 33,000 workers in the river trades, of whom Colquhoun claimed 11,000 were known criminals and "on the game". The river police received a hostile reception by riverfront workers not wishing to lose their supplementary income. A mob of 2000 attempted to burn down the police office with the police inside. The skirmish that followed resulted in the first line of duty death for the new force with the killing of Gabriel Franks.

Nevertheless, Colquhoun reported to his backers that his force was a success after its first year, and his men had "established their worth by saving £122,000 worth of cargo and by the rescuing of several lives". Word of this success spread quickly, and the government passed the Marine Police Bill on 28 July 1800, transforming it from a private to public police agency. Colquhoun published a book on the experiment, The Commerce and Policing of the River Thames. It found receptive audiences far outside London, and inspired similar forces in places in other countries, notably, New York City, Dublin, and Sydney.

== Significance for "modern" policing ==
Historians of policing credit Colquhoun's innovation as a critical development leading up to Robert Peel’s "new" police three decades later. Along with the Bow Street Runners, the Marine Police Force was eventually absorbed by the Metropolitan Police in the 19th century. Colquhoun's utilitarian approach to the problem – using a cost-benefit argument to obtain support from businesses standing to benefit – allowed him to achieve what Henry and John Fielding failed for their Bow Street detectives. Unlike the stipendiary system at Bow Street, the river police were full-time, salaried officers prohibited from taking private fees.

The idea of a police, as it existed in France, was considered an affront to the liberal English, particularly during this period of upheaval. For the government then, it was not only a matter of saving money, but that there was significant opposition and little support from political constituencies. In building the case for the police in the face of England's firm anti-police sentiment, Colquhoun framed the political rationale on economic indicators to show that a police dedicated to crime prevention was "perfectly congenial to the principle of the British constitution". Moreover, he went so far as to praise the French system, which had reached "the greatest degree of perfection" in his estimation.

As impressive as Colquhoun's salesmanship of the public police idea was, his main contribution is recognized as the introduction of crime prevention, or preventive policing, as a fundamental principle to the English police system. His police were to be a deterrent to crime by their permanent presence on the Thames. He came to this conclusion through viewing policing as a science, and in utilitarian fashion, attempted to press that science into the service of the national political economy. He published two dozen treatises on a variety of social problems, but the most significant is his 1796 A treatise on the police of the metropolis.

The Marine Police Force continues to operate at the same Wapping High Street address. In 1839 it merged with the Metropolitan Police Force to become Thames Division; and is now the Marine Support Unit of the Metropolitan Police Service.

== Hanseatic diplomat ==
Patrick Colquhoun was appointed as Resident Minister and Consul general to Britain by the Hanseatic cities Hamburg in 1804, and Bremen and Lübeck shortly after in the following as the successor of Henry Heymann, who was also master of the Steelyard (In German: Stalhofmeister). Colquhoun was valuable to those cities through the time of their occupation by the French until 1814 since he also provided the indirect communication between Northern Germany and Whitehall, especially in 1808, when the three cities considered their membership in the Confederation of the Rhine. His son James Colquhoun was his successor as Consul of the Hanseatic cities in London.

== Meat and Soup Charity ==
The 'Meat and Soup Charity' began in 1797 to provide cheap meals to impoverished London East End residents. Colquhoun led a committee, formed at Lloyd's Coffee House to establish this initiative. The charity provided discounted hot meals, to be collected at eating houses, via a ticket system. Local officials vetted applicants to ensure they qualified, paying close attention to exclude anyone they thought suffered with alcohol addiction.

Colquhoun was motivated to start the initiative after visiting five 'sober and honest' families in Mile End, East London, who were struggling financially due to job loss. Across these five homes - which housed a total of 33 men, women and children - he found only four 'miserable' corded bedsteads.

Colquhoun's scheme provided relief to 10,000 individuals sustaining them with two meals per week over the course of the five months that the scheme lasted.

== Criticism ==
Marxist historian Peter Linebaugh posits another persona of Colquhoun, i.e., the agent of often violent oppression wholly in the service of an industrialist and property-holding class in the earliest incarnation of socio-economic warfare in the Atlantic economy. The capitalist, investor regime needed a laboring under-class in thrall to subsistence wages to maximize profits. And, as farming the Commons had been denied them, the increasingly desperate worker was feared by those keepers of the status quo. In 1806, in his A treatise on indigence (pp. 7–8), Colquhoun had written:

Poverty is ... a most necessary and indispensable ingredient in society, without which nations and communities could not exist in a state of civilisation. It is the lot of man — it is the source of wealth, since without poverty there would be no labour, and without labour there could be no riches, no refinement, no comfort, and no benefit to those who may be possessed of wealth — inasmuch as without a large proportion of poverty surplus labour could never be rendered productive in procuring either the conveniencies or luxuries of life.

Colquhoun was not immune to criticism from his contemporaries. Observations on a late Publication: intituled, A treatise on the police of the metropolis, for instance, published in 1800, criticised Colquhoun for fearmongering about the extent of crime in London, suggesting that doing so was "dangerous" because it tended "to produce innovations that were not merely useless, but that which may prove prenicious to the public body, and be paritularly grevious to individuals"; and that some of Colquhoun's "remedies ... are of a suspicious character, and ought to be treated with rigid scrutiny, lest in the adoption of them, real evils may be experienced while attempting to get rid of imaginary or trivial ones."

== Selected works ==
- Observations and facts relative to public houses (1764). 1st edition (1764); 2nd edition (no date).
- Heads of a plan for establishing a chamber of commerce and manufactures in the city of Glasgow and the places adjacent (1782).
- Case of the British merchants who traded to America previous to the late war (1787).
- Considerations relative to a plan of relief for the cotton manufactory (1788).
- A representation of facts relative to the rise and progress of cotton manufacture in Great Britain (1789).
- Useful suggestions favourable to the comfort of the labouring people (1795).
- A treatise on the police of the metropolis (1796). 1st edition (1796); 2nd edition (1796); 3rd edition (1796); 4th edition (1797); 6th edition (1800); 7th edition (1806).
- An Account of a meat and soup charity (1797).
- A general view of the causes and existence of frauds, embezzlements, peculation and plunder, of His Majesty's stores in the dock yards, and other public repositories (1799).
- A general view of the depredations committed on West-India and other property in the port of London (1799).
- A general view of the national police system (1799).
- A treatise on the commerce and police of the River Thames (1800).
- Suggestions offered to the consideration of the public for the purpose of reducing the consumption of bread corn (1800). 2nd edition (no date).
- A treatise on the functions and duties of a constable (1803).
- A treatise on Indigence (1806).
- A new and appropriate system of education for the labouring people (1806).
- The National Jubilee (1809).
- A treatise on the population, wealth, power and resources of the British Empire (1814). 1st edition (1814); 2nd edition (1815).
- Epitome of a scheme of finance (1816).
