= Madonna and Child with Saint Jerome and Saint Dorothy =

1516 painting by Titian

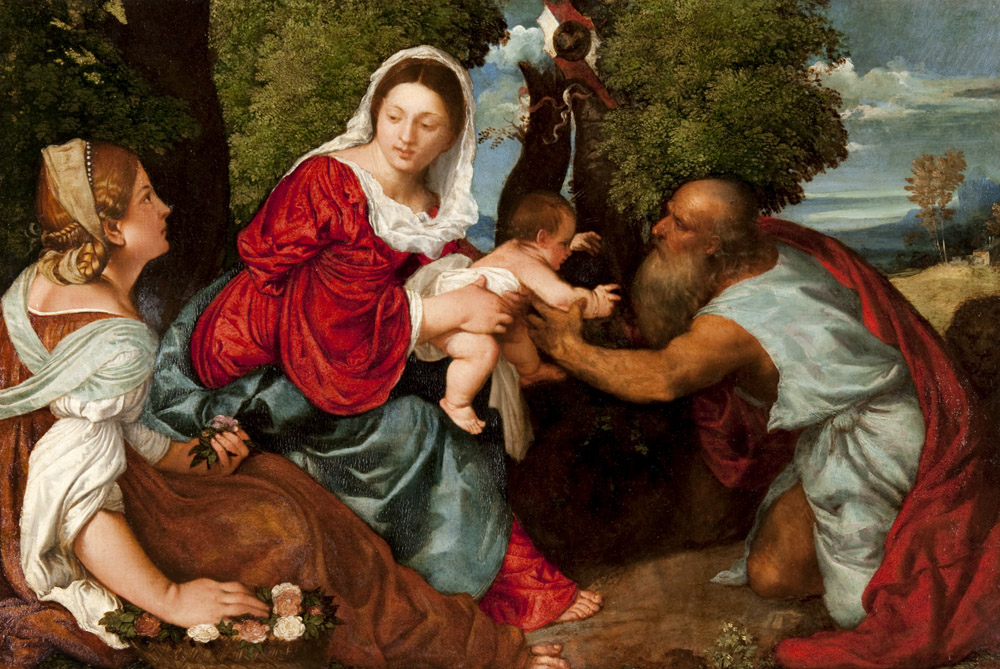

Madonna and Child with Saint Jerome and Saint Dorothy is a 1516 oil on canvas painting, now in the Kelvingrove Art Gallery and Museum in Glasgow, which purchased it from the McLellan collection in 1856. The Madonna's pose is based on that of Raphael's Esterhazy Madonna.

Its attribution is debated. It was previously attributed to the school of Titian, perhaps an autograph work by his brother Francesco Vecellio or by Polidoro Lanzani. It was later identified as an autograph work by Titian himself due to a 1680 print by Le Fébre attributing the image to Titian, though it has now been definitively attributed to Vecellio.
