= Seiyodo Tomiharu =

Japanese netsuke carver (1733–1810)

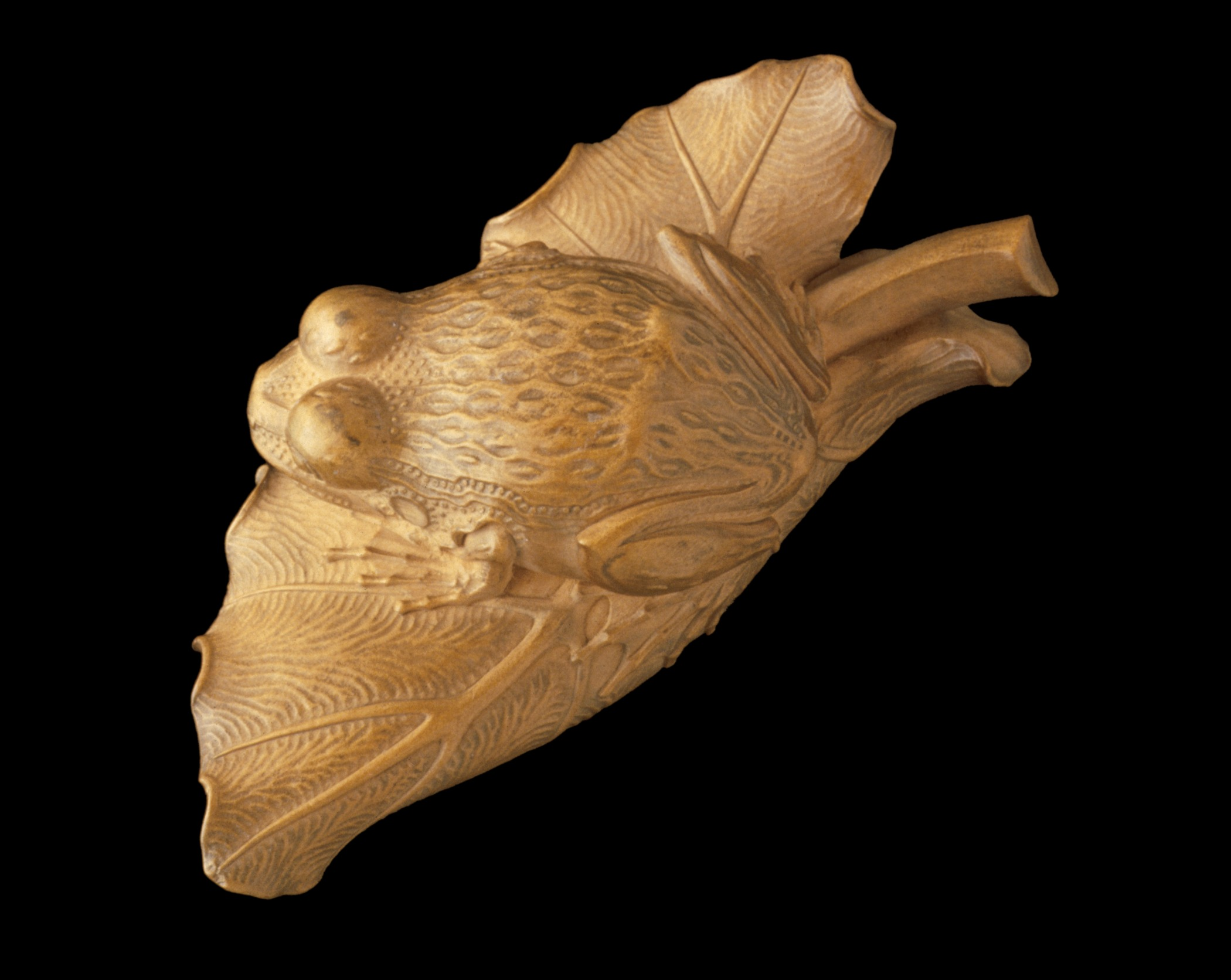
Frog on Taro Leaf netsuke out of boxwood, by Seiyōdō Tomiharu (1782)

Seiyōdō Tomiharu (青陽堂 富春 1733–1810) was a Japanese netsuke carver, and the leader of its Iwami school.

His daughter Seiyōdō Bunshōjo (1764–1838) became a renowned artist as well. A disciple of his school was Kanman (1793–1859).
