= Avant armour =

Complete armour set in Glasgow, Scotland

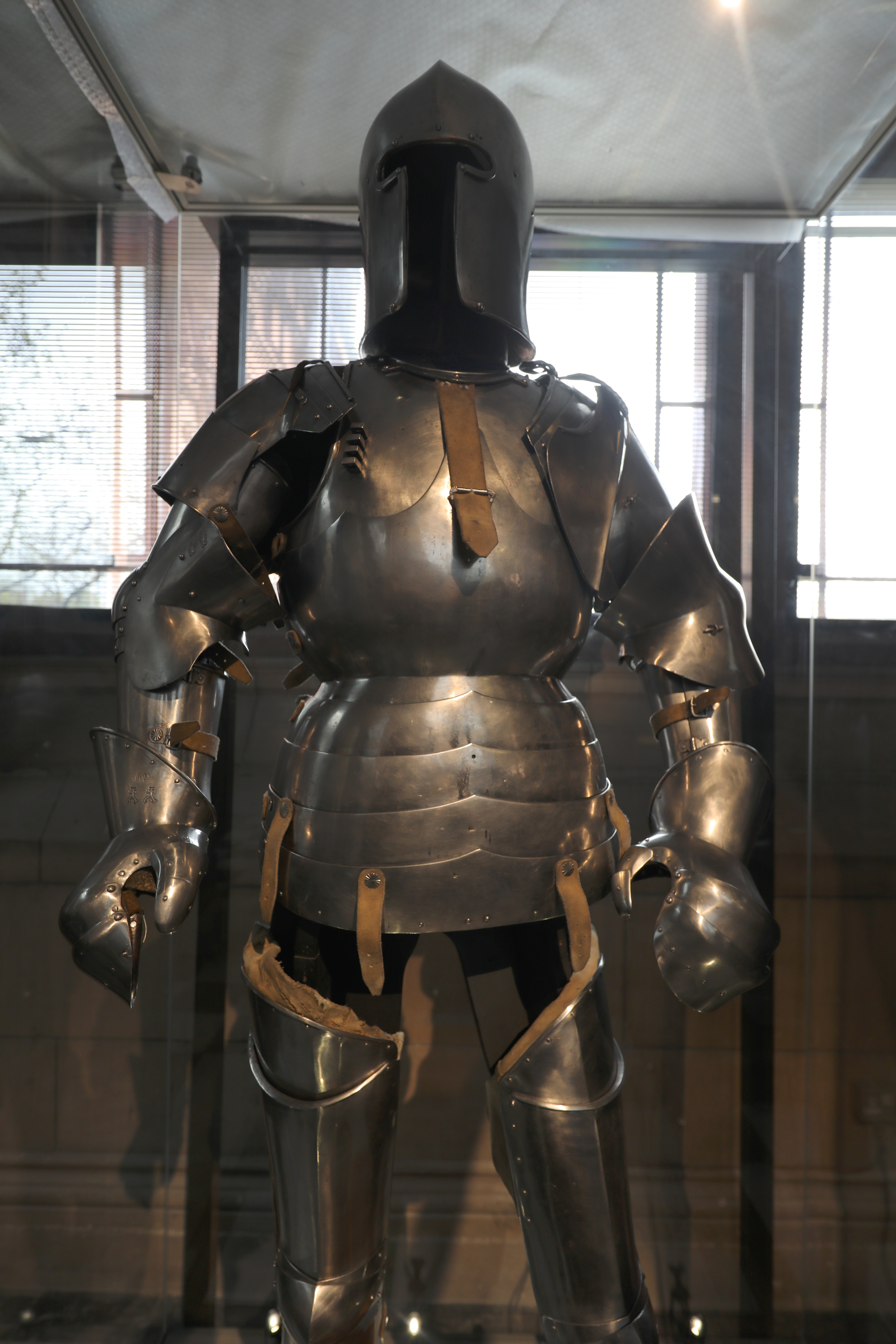
The upper part of the armour

The Avant Armour, in the R. L. Scott collection in Glasgow, is one of the oldest near-complete armours of its type in Europe. It is named after the repeating inscription on the breastplate – avant, meaning "forward". The armour was made between 1440 and 1445 for a member of the Matchs family of Churburg Castle.

The Avant armour was made in Milan, one of medieval Europe's most prolific armour-making cities by the armourer Giovanni Corio with the leg pieces made by Giovanni da Garavalle. The Avant armour is covered in armourer's marks – 51 in total – bearing the signatures of the skilled craftsmen who made it.

This armour displays characteristics typical of those produced in Northern Italy in the mid to late 15th century. The breastplate consists of two parts connected by a central strap, and the large pauldrons and couters provide significant overlap so as to protect the vulnerable areas between the plates. The armour is also notably asymmetrical, the left arm having more solid protection while the right arm is less bulky to provide greater mobility. These characteristics are shared with other Italian armours of the same period, such as the armour of Condottiere Roberto Sanseverino, and the armour found in the Sanctuary of the Madonna in Mantua.

Armours in this style were produced by Milanese craftsmen and exported all over Europe during this period. Records from the Wars of the Roses mention English knights acquiring 'armour of meleyn', referring to Milanese-crafted armour. Similar armour is also featured prominently in artwork by Andrea Mantegna and Piero della Francesca.

The currently displayed barbute helmet and right gauntlet are not original to the rest of the armour, but are authentic pieces. The left gauntlet was reproduced in the 20th century.
