= Francesco Vecellio =

Italian painter

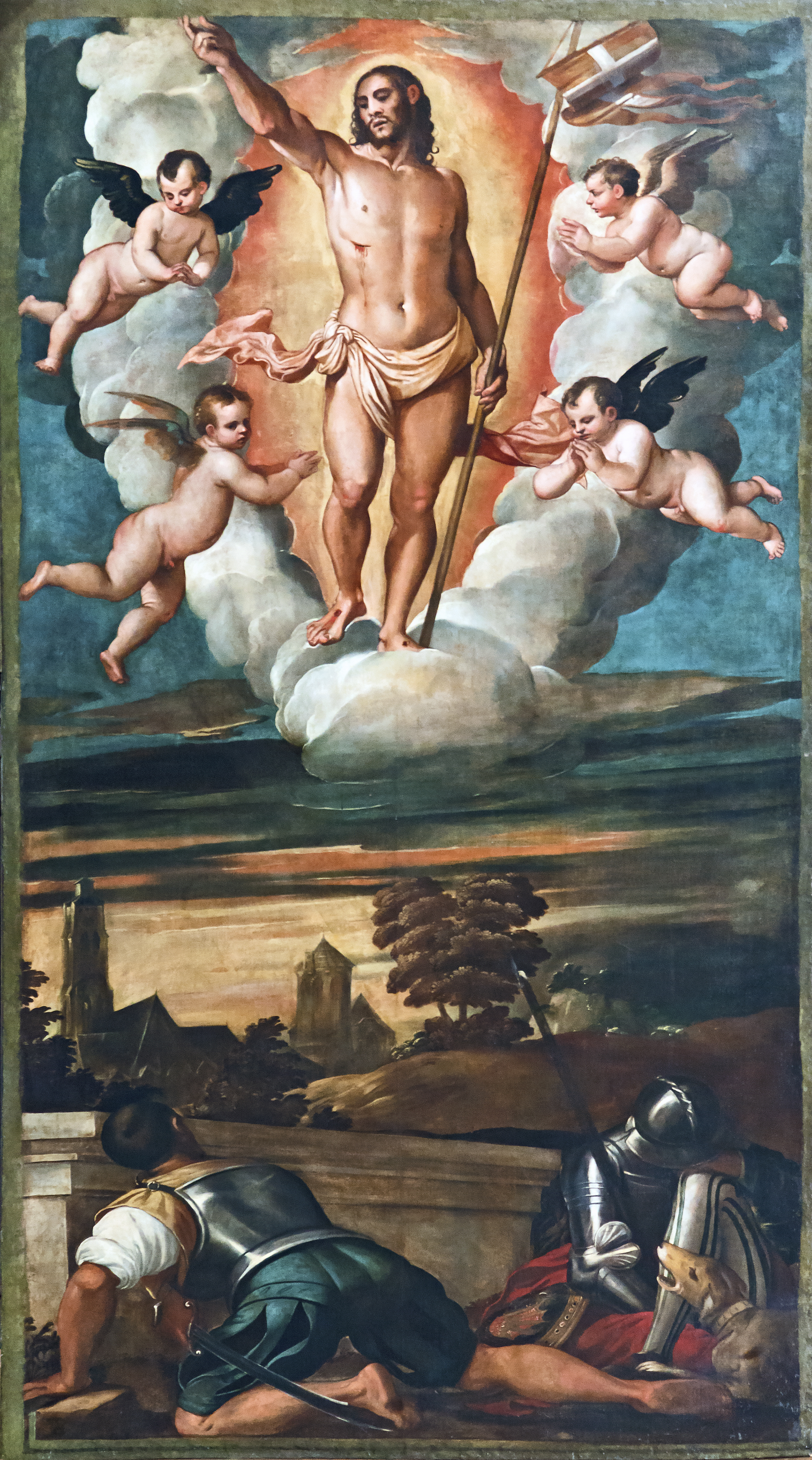
Resurrection - Church San Salvador Venice

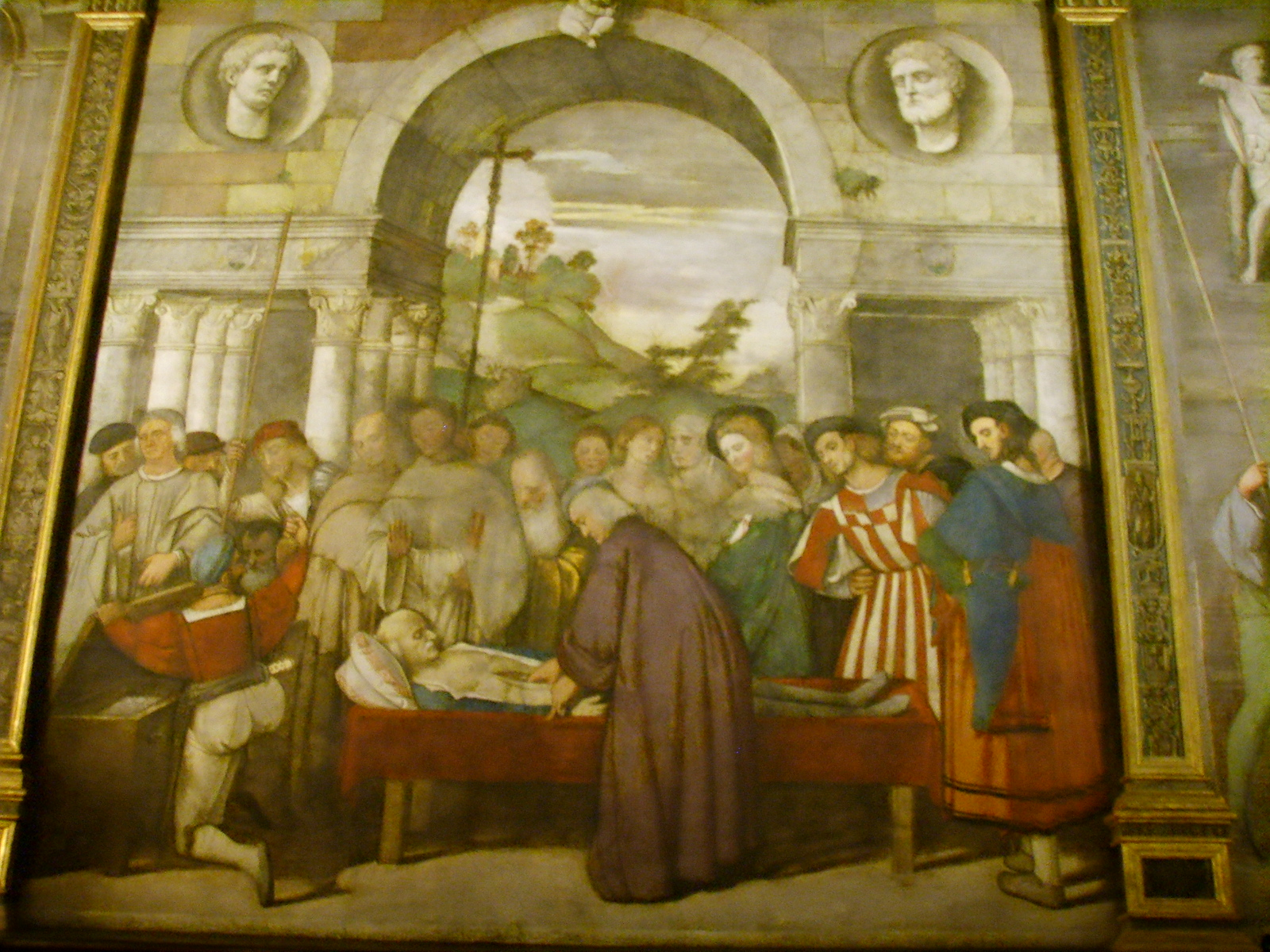
Attributed to Francesco Vecellio, Saint Antonio Searches with Great Interest for the Heart in the Coffin

Francesco Vecellio (c. 1475 – 1560) was a Venetian painter of the Italian Renaissance. Vecellio was born in Pieve di Cadore, in the Republic of Venice, in either 1475 or 1483; he was the elder brother and close collaborator of the painter Tiziano Vecellio ("Titian"). He was a soldier, and fought in battles at Vienna and at Verona. He then worked as a painter; in 1530 he painted the shutters of the organ of the church of San Salvador in Venice. From about 1534 he worked as a wood-engraver. He painted an Annunciation for San Nicola di Bari, now in the Gallerie dell'Accademia, along with Madonna and Child with Saint Jerome and Saint Dorothy (Glasgow).

He died in Pieve di Cadore in 1559 or 1560.
