= Anne Hull Grundy =

German-born British art collector and philanthropist

- Born: Anne Ullmann; December 9, 1926; Nuremberg, Germany
- Died: August 7, 1984 (aged 57); England
- Occupations: Art collector, philanthropist, writer
- Known for: Major donations of decorative arts, netsuke, and jewellery to the British Museum and other UK museums
- Spouse: John Hull Grundy (m. 1949)
- Parent: Philipp Ullmann

Anne Hull Grundy (née Ullmann, 9 December 1926–7 August 1984) was a German-born British art collector and philanthropist. Her 1978 gift to the British Museum comprised some of the finest netsuke and European decorative arts received by that museum.

== Early life ==
Anne Ullmann was born in Nuremberg, Germany in 1926 in a Jewish banking family. Forced to emigrate following the advent of the Nazis, her family settled in Northampton. Her father Philipp Ullmann's company Mettoy became famous for its metal toys, including the Corgi line of cars.

== Collections ==
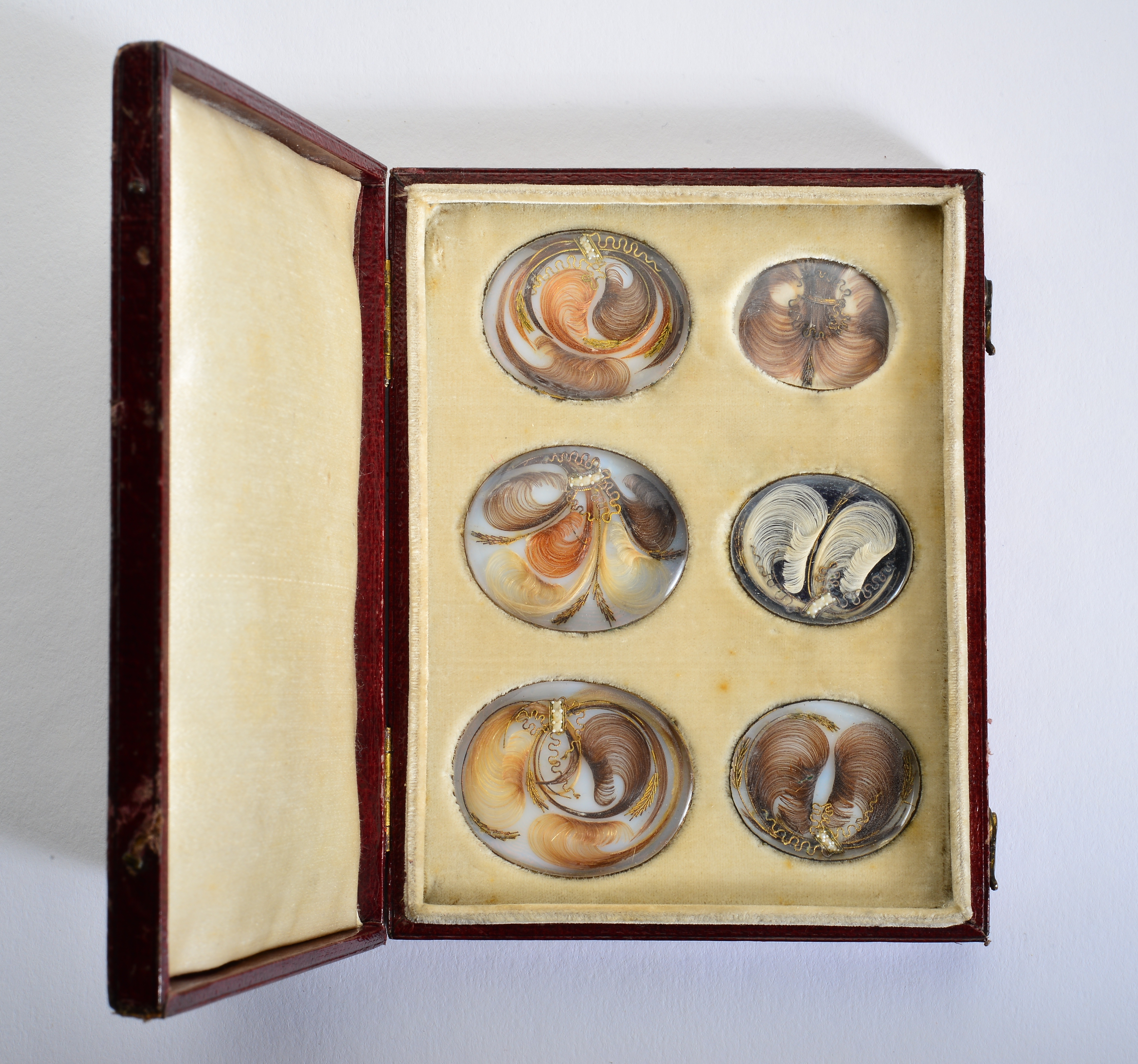
19th-century memorial jewellery made from human hair in a case, from the Hull Grundy collection, now in Harrogate Museum.

She had family wealth as well as income from the Keyser-Ullmann bank and this enabled Ulmann to collect art from the age of 11, especially ivory, ceramics, metalwork and jewellery.

She married John Hull Grundy (1926–1984), an entomologist and artist, in 1949. Shortly thereafter, she was debilitated by a chronic respiratory illness. Her purchases of fine art continued, with trusted dealers bringing the works to her sickbed. In many cases, she bought works via mail. Her focus of collecting became European jewellery and Japanese ivory.

A 1976 catalogue of an exhibition of decorative arts at the British Museum (Jewellery through 7000 years) made Grundy realise that the museum's collection ended in the 1700s. She resolved to update their holdings by acquiring 18th and 19th century objects. In 1978 she donated a large part of her collection to the British Museum. This possibly comprised the best of her collections as she had separately donated fine pieces to other museums in the UK, including the Fitzwilliam in Cambridge, Manchester and Glasgow. Some of the major pieces included a 1559 silver roundel by Lambert Suavius commemorating the Peace of Cateau-Cambrésis, and silver portrait medallions of Elizabeth I and James I by Simon de Passe. There were also cameos by Italian masters Pistrucci, Berini and Girometti. The value of her donation stemmed from the good documentation of the art works, especially those from European and American engravers and designers. From her Japanese collections were jizai okimono, articulated iron animals, as well as netsuke.

Another recipient of Grundy's gift was the Kelvingrove Art Gallery and Museum in Glasgow, which obtained nearly a thousand pieces of jewellery tracing the history of European jewellery over a period of two centuries. This included an Italian miniature Aladdin's lamp brooch from 1860 and English fuchsia gold and ivory drop earrings from 1835.

== Later life ==
Grundy wrote articles on the decorative arts both for the specialist and the popular press. Between 1958 and 1961 she contributed a 'collectors' column for The Times.

Grundy's husband died in 1984. She died the same year.
