= Alexander Kellock Brown =

Scottish landscape painter (1849–1922)

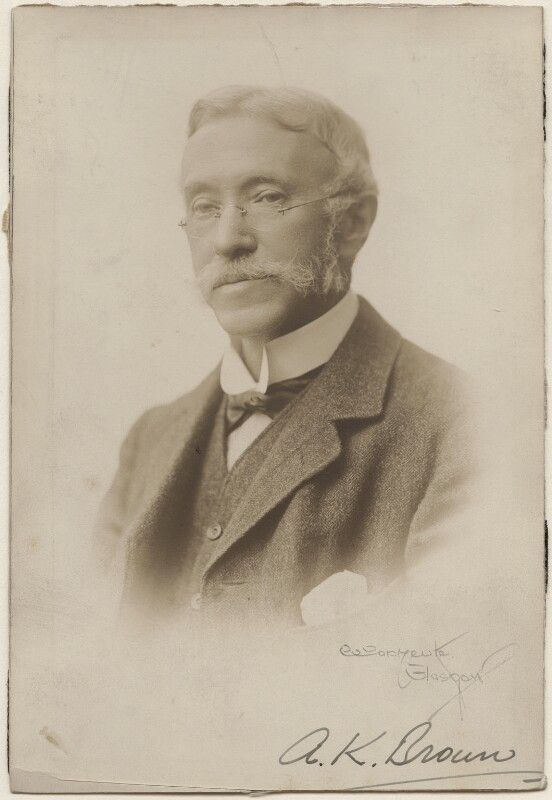
Alexander Kellock Brown by Unknown photographer, 1870s-1900s

Alexander Kellock Brown (11 February 1849 – 9 May 1922) was a Scottish painter of landscapes and brother of the sculptor William Kellock Brown. He painted in oils and water-colors and exhibited frequently at the Royal Scottish Academy exhibits between 1871 and 1922.

== History ==
Brown received his first drawing lessons in the Free Church Normal School, Cowcaddens. He took night classes at the Glasgow Art School taught by Robert Greenlees. Brown was an apprentice in the designing department of Inglis and Wakefield, calico printers, for seven years. Later, Brown studied at the Heatherly School in London.

Brown traveled and painted with such fellow artists as James Docharty and E. A. Walton

== Associations ==
Brown was involved in many art organizations in Scotland.

Royal Scottish Academy	associate (ARSA)
Royal Scottish Academy	academician (RSA)
Royal Institute of Painters in Water Colours	member
The Royal Glasgow Institute of Fine Arts	member
The Royal Glasgow Institute of Fine Arts	council member
The Glasgow Art Club	member
The Royal Scottish Society of Painters in Water Colours (RWS)	original member
Scottish Artists Benevolent Association	founding member, secretary, president
