= Glasgow Society of Lady Artists =

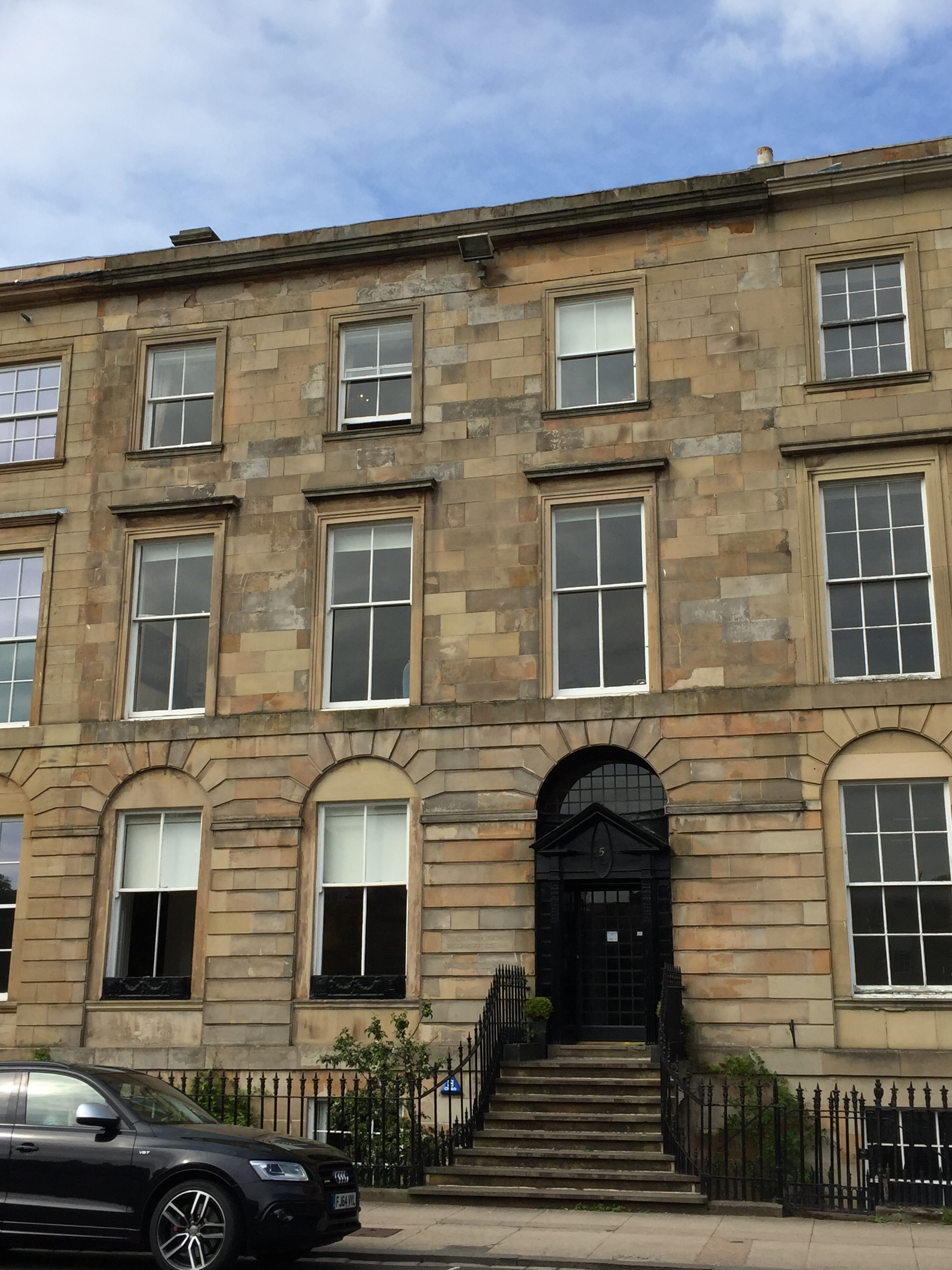
5 Blythswood Square, home to the Society until 1971.

The Glasgow Society of Lady Artists was founded in 1882 by eight female students of the Glasgow School of Art with the aim of affording due recognition to women in the field of art. It has been described by Jude Burkhauser as "the first residential club in Scotland run by and for women". In the early days of the club, they met at 136 Wellington Street, Glasgow.

The names of the founding members are somewhat under discussion, but they are thought to include: first president Georgina Mossman Greenlees, Mrs Joseph Agnew, Elizabeth Patrick, Margaret M Campbell, Henrietta Robertson, treasurer Frieda Rohl, Jane Nisbet, Helen Salmon, Jane Cowan Wyper, Margaret Macdonald (not Margaret Macdonald Mackintosh), Isabella Ure and Mrs Provan. They were all students or staff at Glasgow School of Art, and were successful artists, teachers and art workers. Their first meeting, in 1882, was held in the studio of Georgina Greenlees which she shared with her father, Robert Greenlees, who was the Head of Glasgow School of Art from 1863 to 1881. He helped the group write a book of rules and is considered by several sources to have encouraged the formation of the group. The object of the society was "The study of Art, to be promoted by means of life classes and monthly meetings at which members will be required to exhibit sketches, and by an annual exhibition of members' work".

The club moved to 22 Charing Cross Mansions, where they occupied three rooms, and by 1895, the group had accumulated sufficient funds to allow the purchase of a house at No. 5 Blythswood Square. Their new premises included a dining room, living room, bedrooms, studio space and a custom-designed gallery (added in 1895). Having bedrooms within the clubs premises allowed the ladies to have a safe place to stay, where the ladies could stay alone without any questions asked, or judged by other members. The Glasgow Art Club was based close by at 185 Bath Street, but it only offered membership to men (and would continue to do so until the 1980s after which ladies could become members).

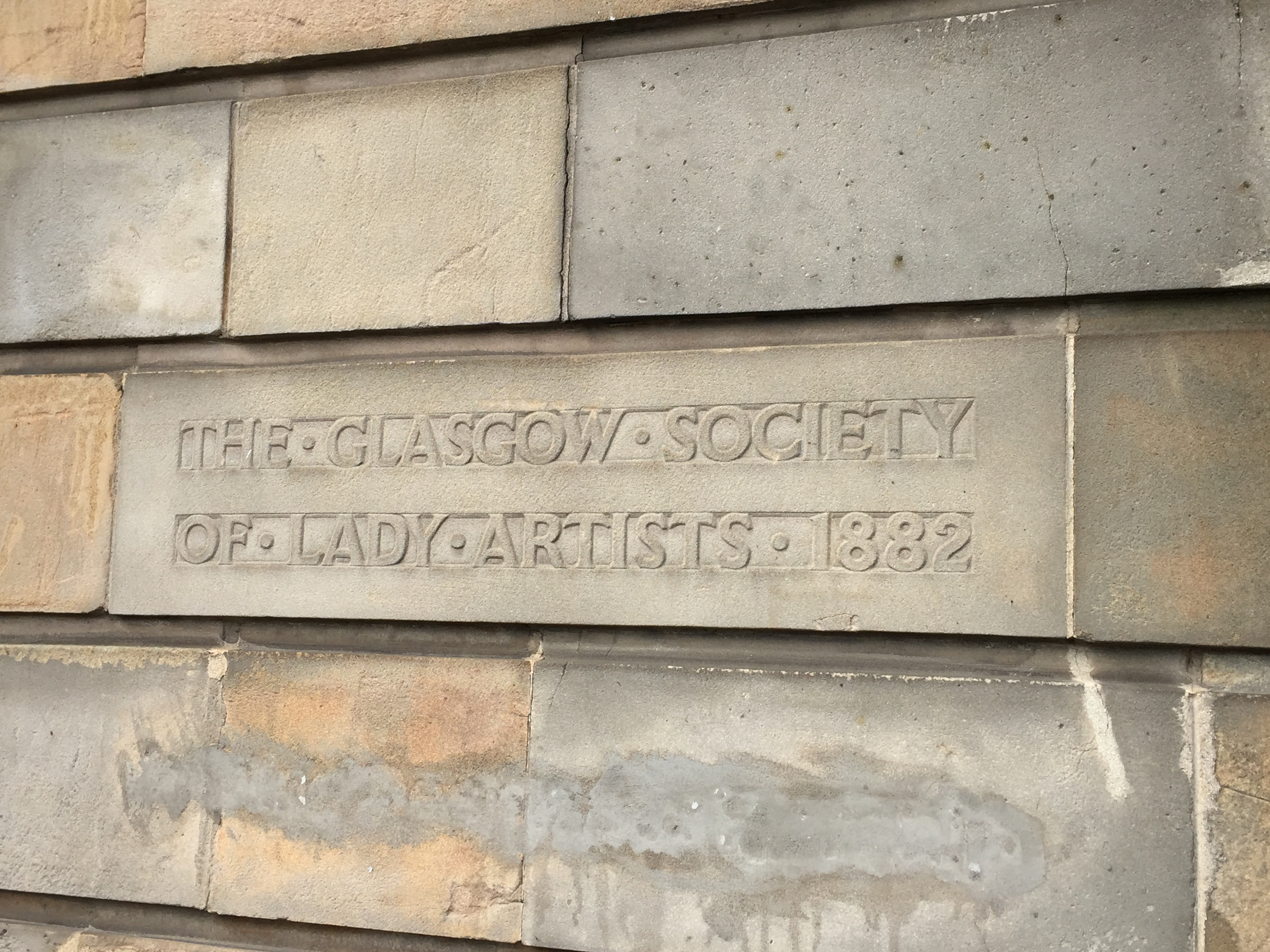
Glasgow Society of Lady Artists’ Club, external wall carving

By 1897 the partnership of George Henry Walton and Fred Rowntree had designed and constructed a gallery for the club's fourteenth annual exhibition. In 1898, a fire in the club buildings destroyed the early records of the club. Another disastrous fire on 27 May 1901 destroyed the gallery and pictures for a special summer exhibition mounted in conjunction with the International Exhibition at Kelvingrove Art Gallery and Museum. The gallery was rebuilt to the design of George Henry Walton and the first exhibition was held on 25 October 1902.

In 1907, a decoration committee commissioned Charles Rennie Mackintosh to carry out certain interior work and the striking black pedimented neo-classical front door. Also in 1907, the society celebrated their 25th anniversary with an exhibition opened by Sir D. Y. Cameron in October that year.

A legacy by Gertrude Annie Lauder produced the Lauder Prize. That prize went to the best adjudged work of the annual exhibition of the society.

The club thrived over the following 64 years until 1971 when the building was sold to the Scottish Arts Council in the expectation that it would continue to be an arts venue, but the council did not do so.

Some members were determined to revive the society, which duly happened in 1975 when it was renamed The Glasgow Society of Women Artists with a Centenary Exhibition being held in the Collins Gallery in 1982.

The society continues today as The Glasgow Society of Women Artists, its primary objective being : ″The promotion of interest in Art and particularly in the work of women artists, fostering this by regular exhibitions of members' work and other related activities.″

== Members ==
- Jane Cowan Wyper (artist) (1856–1898)
- Jane Nisbet (Stewart) (artist) (1862–1954)
- Janet Aitken (artist) (1873–1941)
- Janie Allan (1868–1968)
- Helen Paxton Brown (1875–1956)
- Katharine Cameron (1874–1965)
- de Courcy Lewthwaite Dewar (1878–1959)
- Annie French
- Norah Neilson Gray (1882–1931)
- Georgina Greenlees (1849–1932)
- Marjorie Kemp
- Jessie Keppie (1868–1951)
- Jessie M King (1875–1949)
- Ann Macbeth (1875–1948)
- Jessie Newbery (1864–1948)
- Dorothy Carleton Smyth (1880–1933)
- Stansmore Dean Stevenson (1866–1944)
- Amy Lawson Strongman (1870–1931)

== See also ==
- Edinburgh Ladies Art Club
