= Kellock =

Kellock is a surname. Notable people with the surname include:

- Alastair Kellock (born 1981), Scottish rugby union player and administrator
- Billy Kellock (1889–1958), English football player and manager
- Billy Kellock (footballer, born 1954) (born 1954), Scottish footballer
- Brian Kellock (1962–2025), Scottish jazz pianist
- David Taylor Kellock (1913–1988), Australian stained glass artist
- Fiona Kellock (born 1948), Scottish swimmer
- Lindsay Kellock (born 1990), Canadian equestrian
- Roy Kellock (1893–1975), Canadian Supreme Court Justice
- Thomas Kellock (1923–1993), British judge and politician

See also:

- Alexander Kellock Brown (1849–1922), Scottish landscape painter
- William Kellock Brown (1856–1934), Scottish sculptor
- Killough (surname)
