= De Courcy Lewthwaite Dewar =

Scottish metalwork designer (1878–1959)

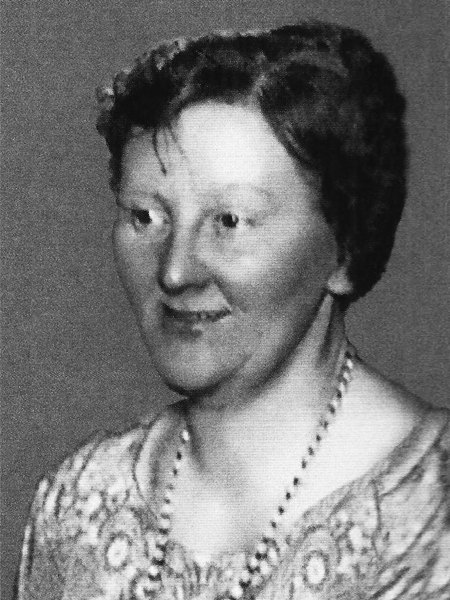
- Born: 12 February 1878; Kandy, Sri Lanka
- Died: 24 November 1959 (aged 81)
- Education: Glasgow School of Art
- Known for: Decorative Metalwork
- Style: Glasgow Style

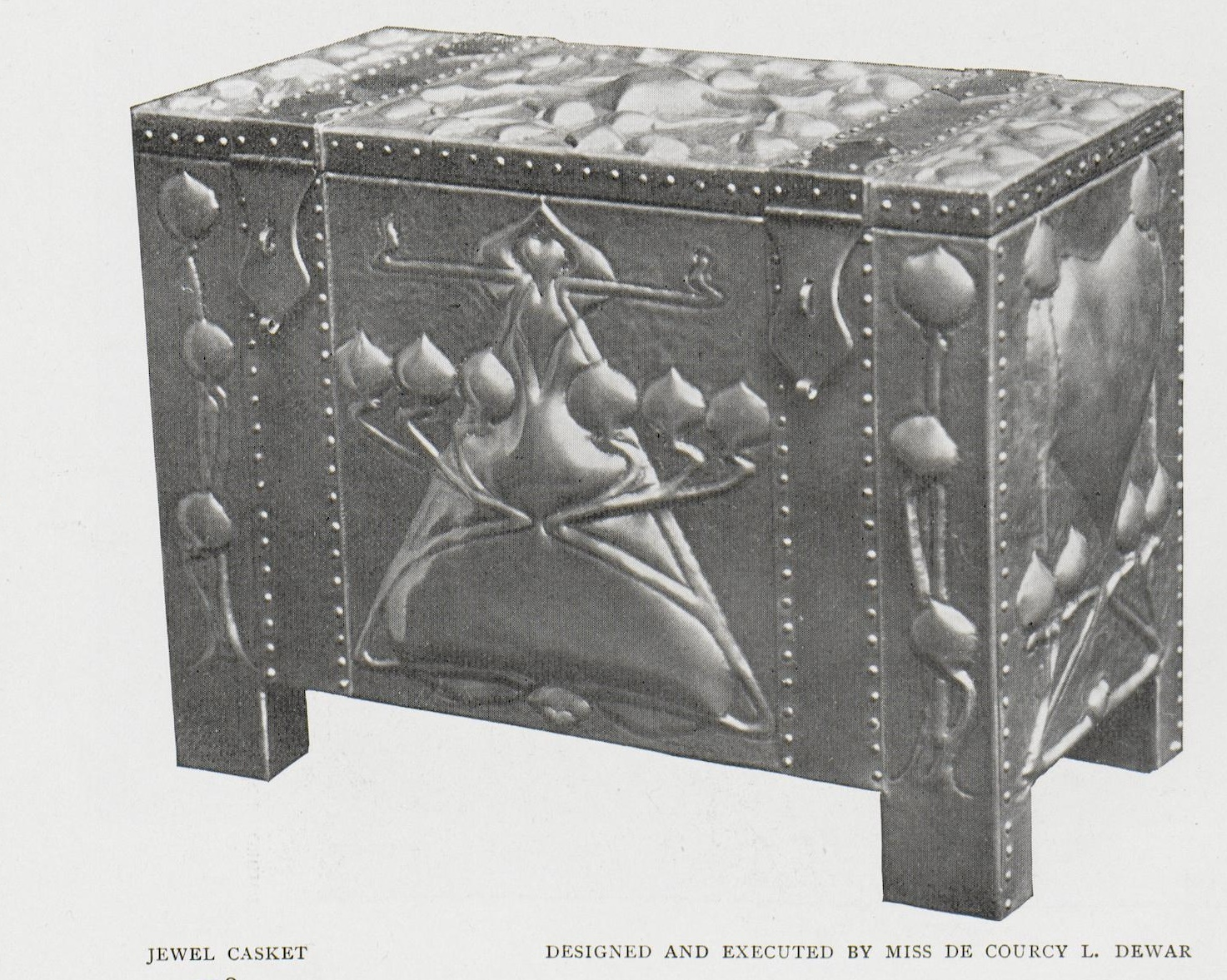
Image published in The Studio (magazine) vol 19 (1900)

De Courcy Lewthwaite Dewar (12 February 1878 – 24 November 1959) was a decorative metalwork designer, and member of the Glasgow Girls group of artists during the 1890/1900s.

== Early life ==
Dewar was born on 12 February 1878 in Kandy, Sri Lanka, which was then known as British Ceylon. Her father was a tea planter called John Lewthwaite Dewar and her mother's name was Amelia Cochrane. Her unusual first name is a family name, although she was also known by the pet name of Kooroovi, meaning small bird in Tamil. Dewar's sister, Margaret Cochrane Dewar, studied at Queen Margaret's College in Glasgow, and became one of the first women in Glasgow to graduate in Medicine, in 1894.

== Career ==
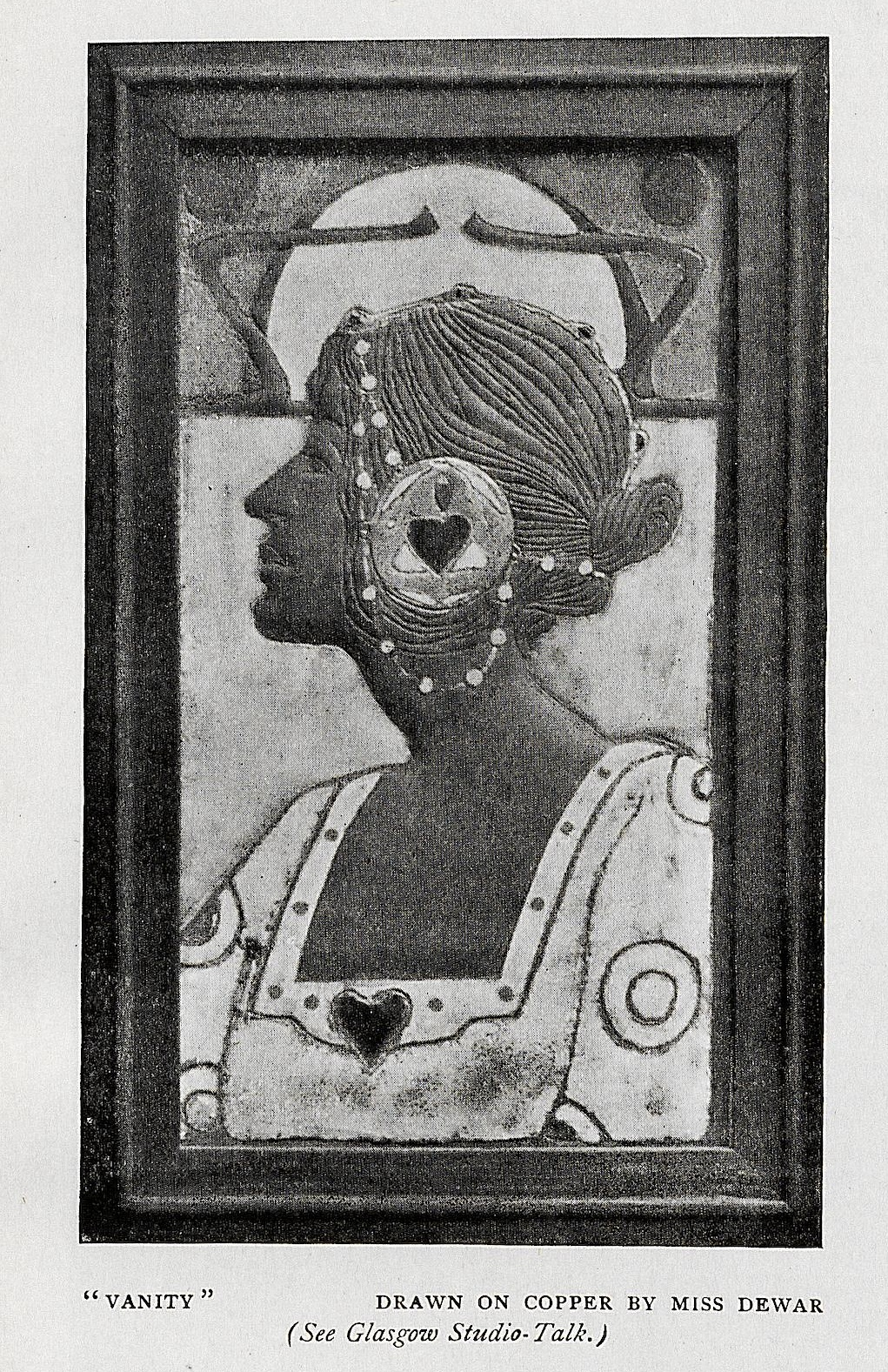
Image published in The Studio vol 24 (1902)

Dewar studied enamel and metalwork at Glasgow School of Art from 1891 until 1908 or 1909. She was taught metalwork by Peter Wylie Davidson. Her work was often illustrated in The Studio magazine. For thirty-eight years, De Courcy taught at Glasgow School of Art, being appointed instructor of enamels by Fra Newbery. She worked alongside fellow artists Ann Macbeth, Jessie M. King, Dorothy Carleton Smyth, Jean Delville, Peter Wylie Davidson, and Kellock Brown.

She instituted the Dewar Prize for enamels to be awarded at the Annual Exhibition of the Glasgow School of Art Club. She had a studio at Central Chamber, 93 Hope Street, Glasgow, where she worked independently from 1900 - 1926. After 1926, she continued to work in a studio at her home at 15 Woodside Terrace, Glasgow.

She is known for a style influenced by heraldic art and Celtic design, as well as developing a style influenced by Czechoslovak folk art. Her enamel work was exhibited at the Scottish Section of the Prima Esposizione Internazionale d'Arte Decorativa Moderna in Turin in 1902. Some of her decorative metalwork pieces were used for illustration in Applied Design in Precious Metals, a publication by her colleague Peter Wylie Davidson. One item featured in the book was a presentation casket featuring the coat of arms of Glasgow, made by Dewar in 1910. The casket was made of zinc and silver, and was decorated with moonstones and enamel panels. In 1935, this casket earned her the Lauder Prize of the Glasgow Society of Lady Artists. This casket is on long term loan to Glasgow Museums.

Dewar was involved with the women's suffrage movement. She designed a banner for the Women's Freedom League in 1908. It was decorated in "flaming red" with the words "Save the Bill". She also designed a banner for Glasgow and West of Scotland Association for Women's Suffrage in 1911 for use at the coronation of George V in London for a fee of 30 shillings. This banner, stating 'Let Glasgow Flourish' is now held at the Glasgow Museums Resource Centre in Glasgow.

Dewar and her friend operated a house for destitute women in the Bellshill, called Harkness House, which the Prince of Wales visited in the 1930s. Footage of De Courcy at the opening can be viewed online on the National Library of Scotland website. This may be the only footage there is of Glasgow suffragettes.

She wrote the History of the Glasgow Society of Lady Artists' Club, published in 1950. While writing this she was the president of the Glasgow Society of Lady Artists. The society is now known as the Glasgow Society of Women Artists.

De Courcy lived with her sister, Katharine, at 15 Woodside Terrace, Glasgow, until her death.

In 2024, artist Eleanor Carlingford created a mural entitled "Kooroovi" on the corner of Byres Road and Ruthven Street, Glasgow.

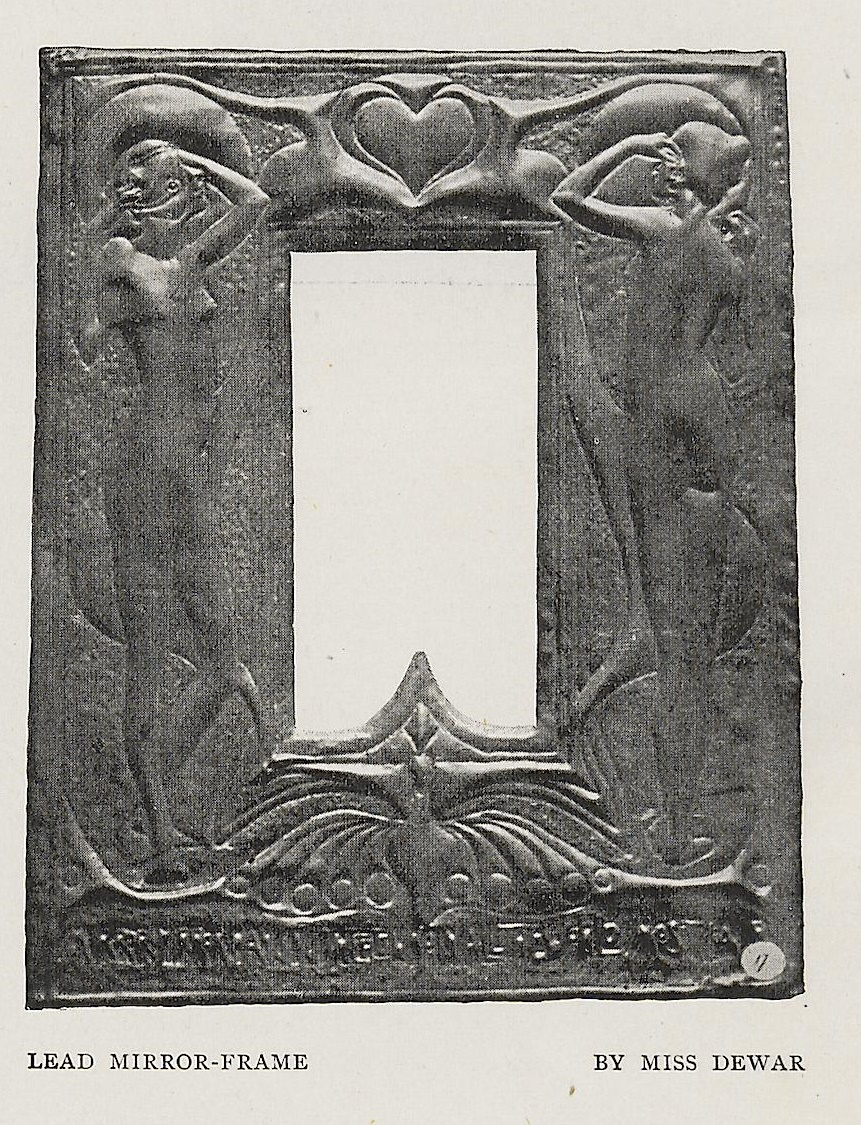
Image published in The Studio vol 15 (1899)

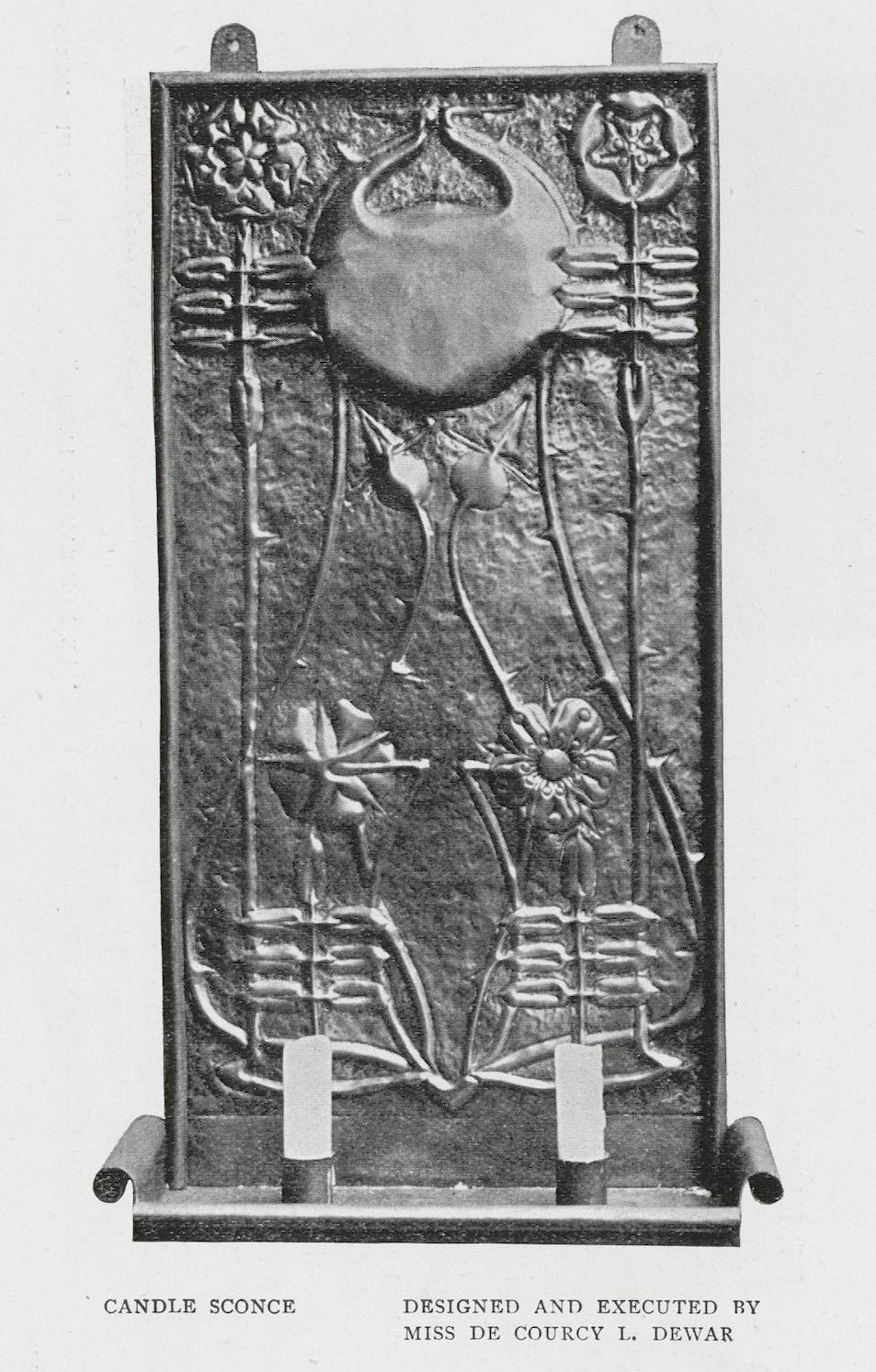
Image published in The Studio vol 19 (1900)

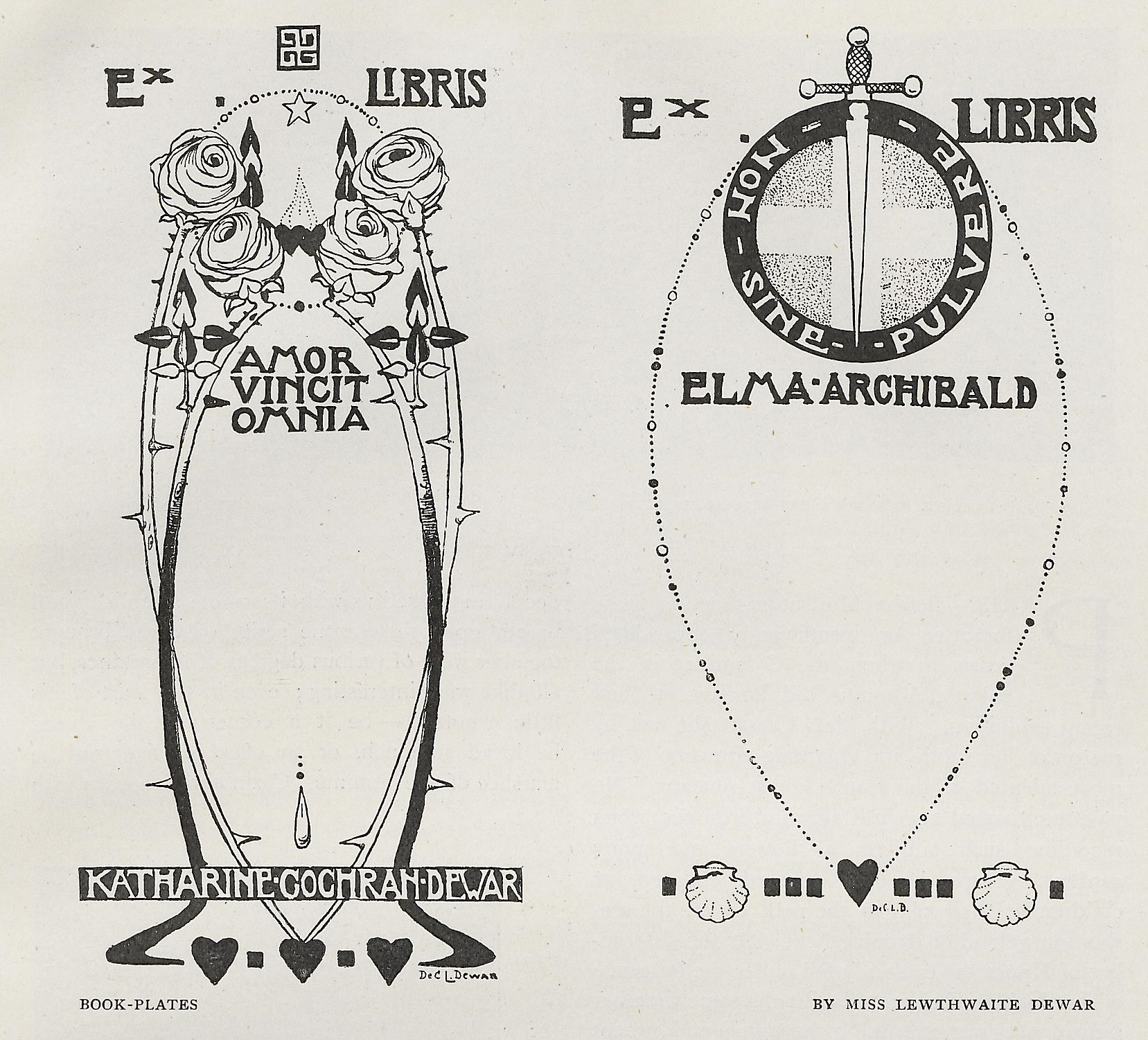
Image published in The Studio vol 42 (1908)

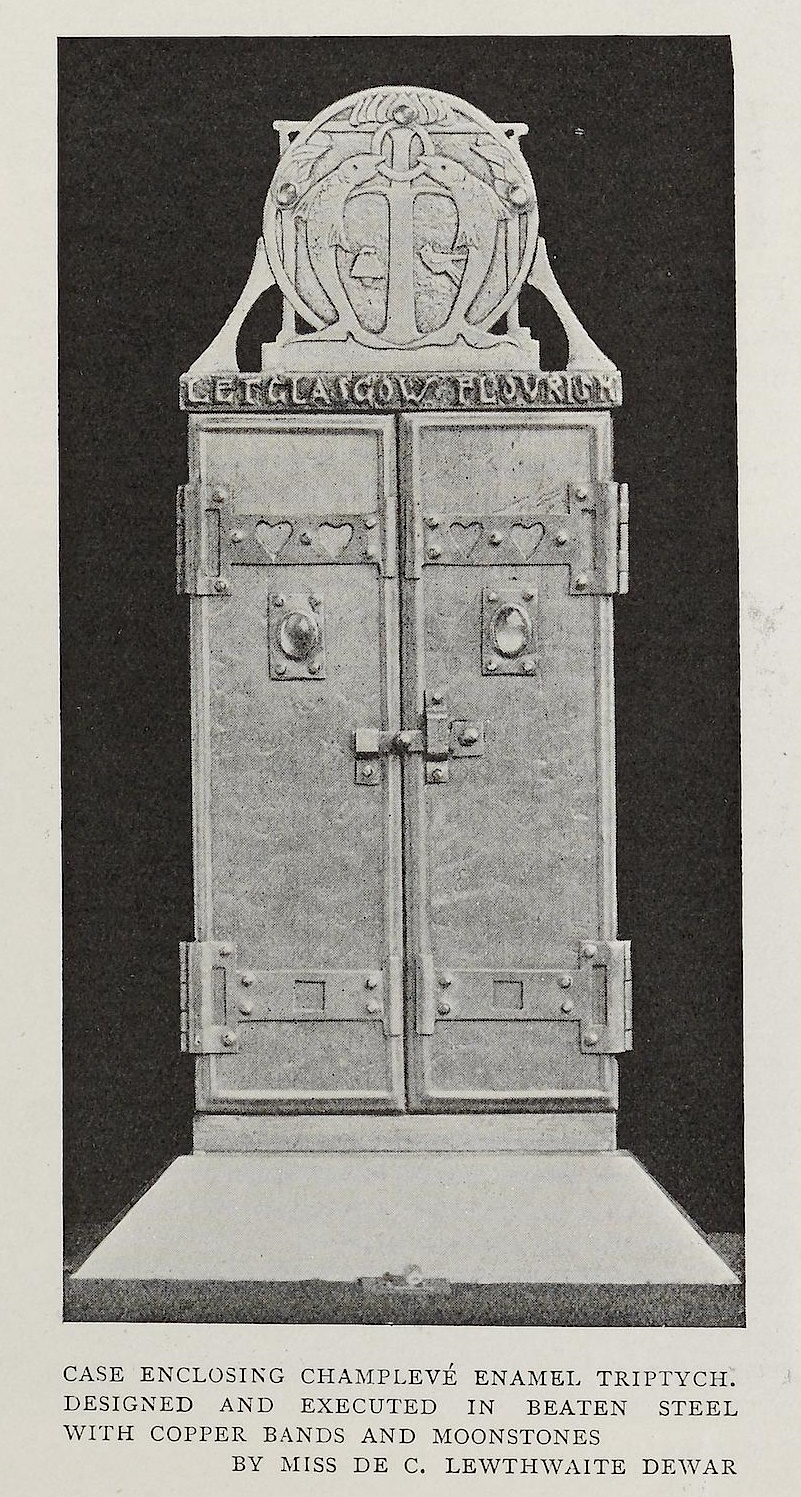
Image published in The Studio vol 47 (1909)

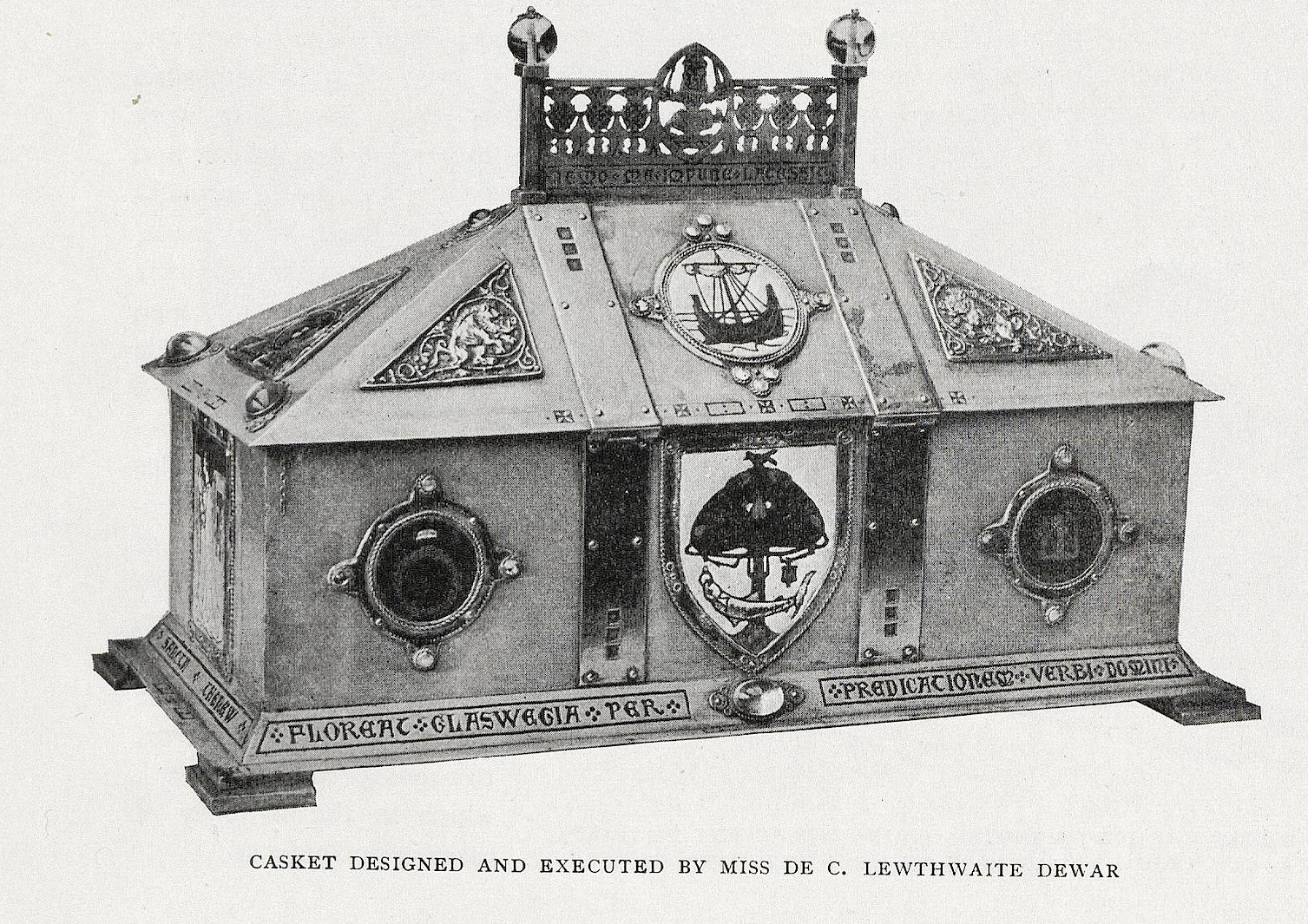
Image published in The Studio vol 66 (1915)

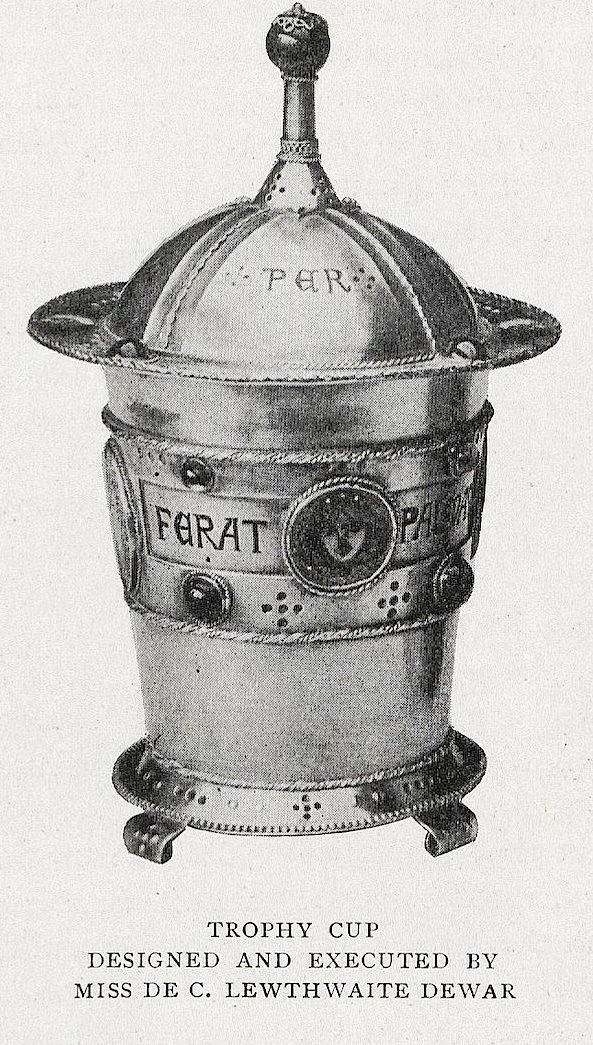
Image published in The Studio

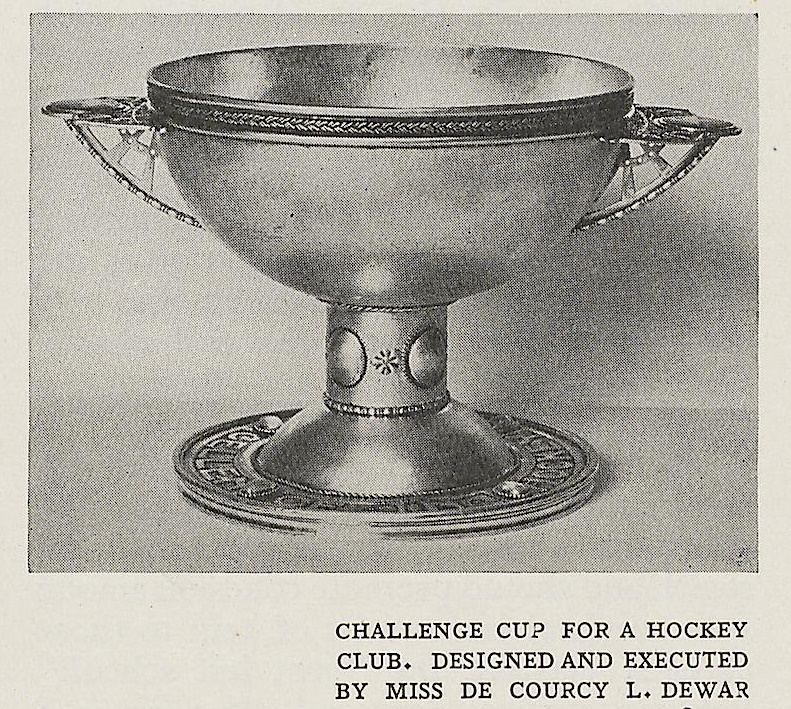
Image published in The Studio vol 86 (1923)

== See also ==
- List of Scottish women artists
- The Glasgow Girls
