= Peter Wylie Davidson =

Scottish sculptor, silversmith, and tutor at the Glasgow School of Art (1870-1963)

- Born: Peter Wylie Davidson; Bridge of Allan
- Education: Glasgow School of Art
- Occupation(s): Artist and Lecturer

Peter Wylie Davidson (1870–1963) was a Scottish sculptor and silversmith who taught decorative metalwork at the Glasgow School of Art from 1897 to 1935.

== Early life ==
Peter Wylie Davidson was born in Bridge of Allan in 1870. He was a student at the Glasgow School of Art from 1884-1903.

== Career ==
In the 1890s, Peter Wylie Davidson set up a metalwork and design studio with his brother William Armstrong Davidson in Glasgow. He taught various art practices during his time at the Glasgow School of Art including leatherwork and bookbinding, woodcarving and he was instructor and assistant master of the metalwork department led by the sculptor William Kellock Brown.

He tutored 'Kooroovi' De Courcy Lewthwaite Dewar, in metalwork in 1897 while she attended Glasgow School of Art becoming lifelong friends. He was part of the Glasgow Style, Britain’s Art Nouveau movement of the 1890–1910.

He retired from Glasgow School of Art in 1934/35.

== Publications ==
1. Educational metalcraft: a practical treatise on repoussé, fine chasing, silversmithing, jewellery, and enamelling (1913)
2. Decorative leatherwork (1923)
3. Applied Design in the Precious Metals (1929)

== Notable works ==
- Swallows Longcase clock circa 1902. Purchased for £18,750 by Glasgow Museums in 2011.
- Swallows in Flight silver brooch. Sold for £1,625 in 2012.
- Pair of candlesticks made to Charles Rennie Mackintosh’s design for Hous’hill, in Nitshill Glasgow, held by Hunterian Museum & Art Gallery, University of Glasgow.

== Exhibitions ==
The Swallows Longcase clock was exhibited as part of the Charles Rennie Mackintosh: Making the Glasgow Style temporary exhibition at Kelvingrove Art Gallery and Museum in Glasgow in 2018.

== Likeness ==
Painting by Ancell Stronach (1934)
