= Charles Doswell Hodder =

English painter

- Born: 15 May 1832; London, England
- Died: 12 June 1926 (aged 94); Edinburgh, Scotland
- Known for: Oils

Charles Doswell Hodder (15 May 1832 - 12 June 1926) was an English painter, who spent most of his work life in Scotland. He became the Trustee' Academy's Master of the academy after Robert Scott Lauder retired.

== Life ==
His father was John Hodder (born c. 1807), a cabinet maker, and Elizabeth Doswell (born c. 1808).

He married Frances Painter (c. 1830 - 13 March 1891) on 14 July 1857.

They had children:- Sophia, Frederick George, Lucy Doswell, Mary Elizabeth, John Doswell, Walter James and Alice Letitia Jane Hodder.

== Art ==
He became the Master of the Trustees' Academy when Alexander Christie died and Robert Scott Lauder retired. He joined the academy at a watershed moment. Robert Scott Lauder had taught a number of brilliant artists like McTaggart, Orchardson, Pettie and Chalmers among many others. However teaching in the Trustees' Academy was to be overseen from the South Kensington Department of Science and Arts from 1858, and at a dash all of the academy's almost 100 years of teaching of Scottish and continental art was left behind in favour of English methods.

This may have influenced Lauder's retiral from the academy. It may have been this new English instruction that prompted the board of trustees to appoint the English taught Charles Hodder.

This caused a schism in the academy and eventually the Antique department - which contained the Fine Arts - split from the Trustees' Academy to form a new Art School in Edinburgh; the School of Applied Arts in 1893.

This left Hodder the Master of a Trustees' Academy which now only had the Design department - a department based on Trades work. He continued to teach the English instruction but in 1903 the academy folded.

In 1864 he exhibited at the Royal Scottish Academy his works:- Sketch From Loch Lomond and Portrait.

In 1871 he exhibited at the Royal Scottish Academy his works:- Old Man's Head - Study; An Old Piper and Sophy.

== Death ==
He died on 12 June 1926 in Edinburgh. The value of his estate was £349, 3 shillings and 9 pence. He is buried in Hanley, near Stoke-on-Trent, in England.

== Works ==
His self portrait is in the National Galleries of Scotland. It was given to the Galleries by his daughter Alice Letitia Jane Hodder in 1943.
