= Kenlock =

Kenlock is a surname. Notable people with the surname include:

- Mark Kenlock (born 1965), English cricketer
- Myles Kenlock (born 1996), English footballer
- Neil Kenlock (born 1950), Jamaican-born British photographer and media professional

== See also ==
- Kellock
