= Alexander Brownlie Docharty =

Scottish painter

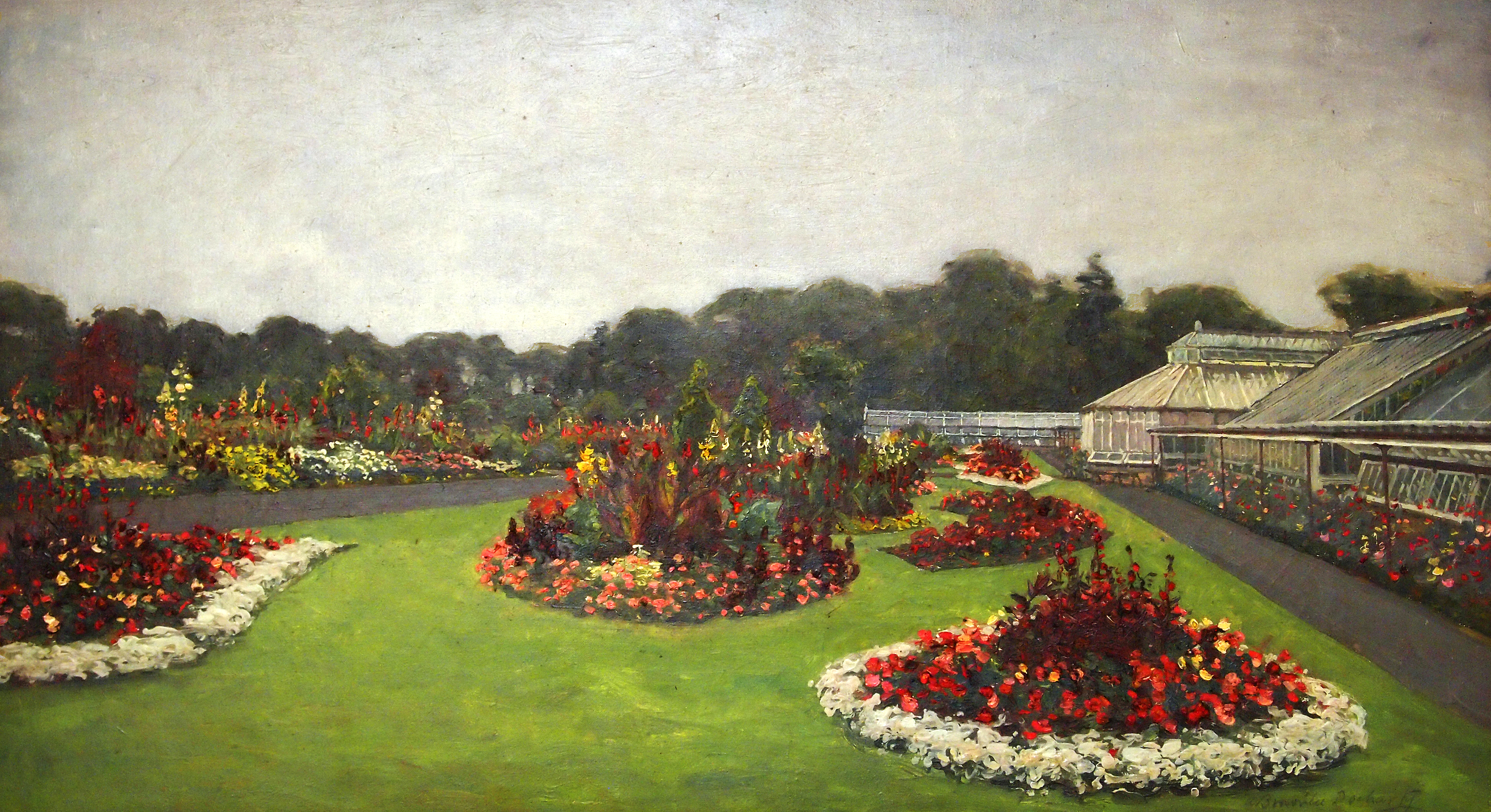
The Walled Garden, Clumber Park by Alexander Brownlie Docharty

Alexander Brownlie Docharty (1862–1940) was a Scottish painter, mainly in oils. He was the second son of Joseph Docharty and Elizabeth Brownlie. Joseph Docharty was a designer of calico prints; Alexander left school at the age of thirteen to join his father. He studied part-time at the Glasgow School of Art, attending Robert Greenlees' evening classes.

In 1878 Docharty's watercolour On The Cart- Pollockshaws was exhibited at the Royal Glasgow Institute of the Fine Arts. The Royal Academy accepted his painting Arran Cottages for exhibition in 1882.

In the early 1880s Docharty was a designer for Inglis and Wakefield, a printing firm based at Busby. He left that firm some time before 1885, when he was based at James Docharty's studio in Bath Street, Glasgow. James was Alexander's uncle.

Docharty moved to Paris in 1894 to study at the Academie Julien under Benjamin Constant and Jean-Paul Laurens. He subsequently lived at Kilkerran, Ayrshire. His Glen Falloch was exhibited in 1906 at the Glasgow Fine Arts Institute.
