= Andrew Wilson (artist) =

Scottish landscape painter (1780–1848)

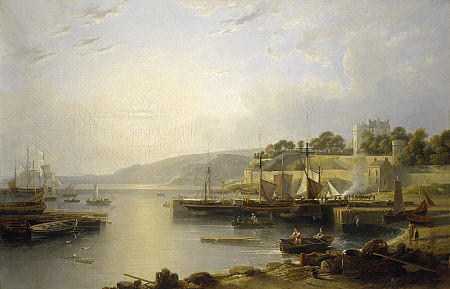
A View of Burntisland, about 1823.

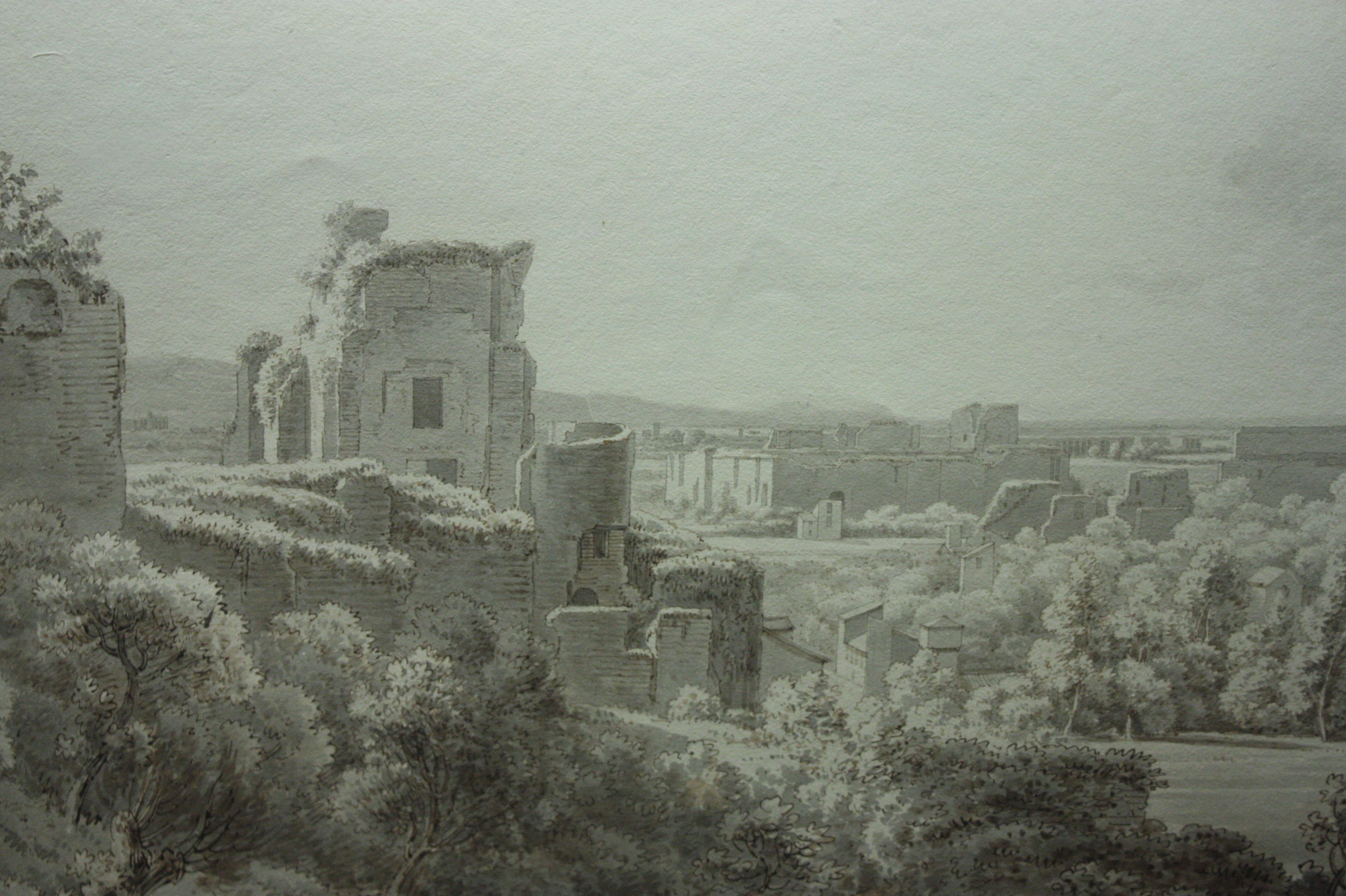
Andrew Wilson, View from the Palantine Hills, Rome, 1801

Andrew Wilson (1780–1848) was a Scottish landscape painter.

== Life ==
Born in Edinburgh, he came of an old Jacobite family. His father was Archibald Wilson, and his mother Elizabeth Shields. When quite young he began to study art under Alexander Nasmyth, and then, at the age of seventeen, went to London, where he worked for some time in the schools of the Royal Academy. He went to Italy in 1800, returning for two more tours, and studied the masters, and became acquainted with the collectors Champernown and Irving. He also made many sketches, principally of the architecture in the neighbourhood of Rome and Naples.

Returning to London in 1803, he saw the advantage of importing pictures by the old masters, and went back to Italy. Europe was at war again, but he reached Genoa, where he settled under the protection of the American consul and was elected a member of the Ligurian Academy. As a member of that society he was present when Napoleon Bonaparte visited its exhibition, and on some envious academician informing the latter, who had paused to admire Wilson's picture, that it was by an Englishman, he was met by the retort: ‘Le talent n'a pas de pays.’ In 1805 he returned through Germany to London with the pictures (over fifty in number) which he had acquired. Among them were Rubens's Brazen Serpent (now in the National Gallery of London) and Jacopo Bassano's Adoration of the Magi (in the National Gallery of Scotland).

Settling in London, he painted a good deal in watercolour, was one of the original members of the Associated Artists (1808), and held for a period the position of teacher of drawing in the Royal Military College, Sandhurst. Appointed in 1818 master of the Trustees' Academy, he moved to Edinburgh, where his pupils included Robert Scott Lauder, William Simson, and David Octavius Hill. While in London he had contributed to the Royal Academy, and in Edinburgh he supported the Royal Institution, of which he was the manager as well as an artist associate member.

In 1826 he received £100 from Peter Spalding via the "Spalding Fund" partly in recognition of his having relandscaped the section of Queen Street Gardens in Edinburgh opposite Spalding's home at 1 Heriot Row around a decade earlier. This windfall equates to around £8000 in current terms.

With this money. later In 1826, he took his wife and family to Italy. He again went south, and for the twenty years following lived in Rome, Florence, and Genoa. During this period he was consulted on art matters, collected pictures for Lord Hopetoun, Lord Pembroke, Sir Robert Peel, and others, and was instrumental in securing for the Royal Institution some of the works which later helped to form the National Gallery of Scotland. He also painted much in both oil and watercolours.

In 1847, leaving his family in Italy, he revisited Scotland, but, on the eve of returning, he died in Edinburgh on 27 November 1848.

== Family ==
In 1808 he married Rachel Ker, daughter of William Ker, descendant of the Inglis of Manner, and had a family of four sons and three daughters. The eldest son was Charles Heath Wilson.
