= William Delacour =

French painter

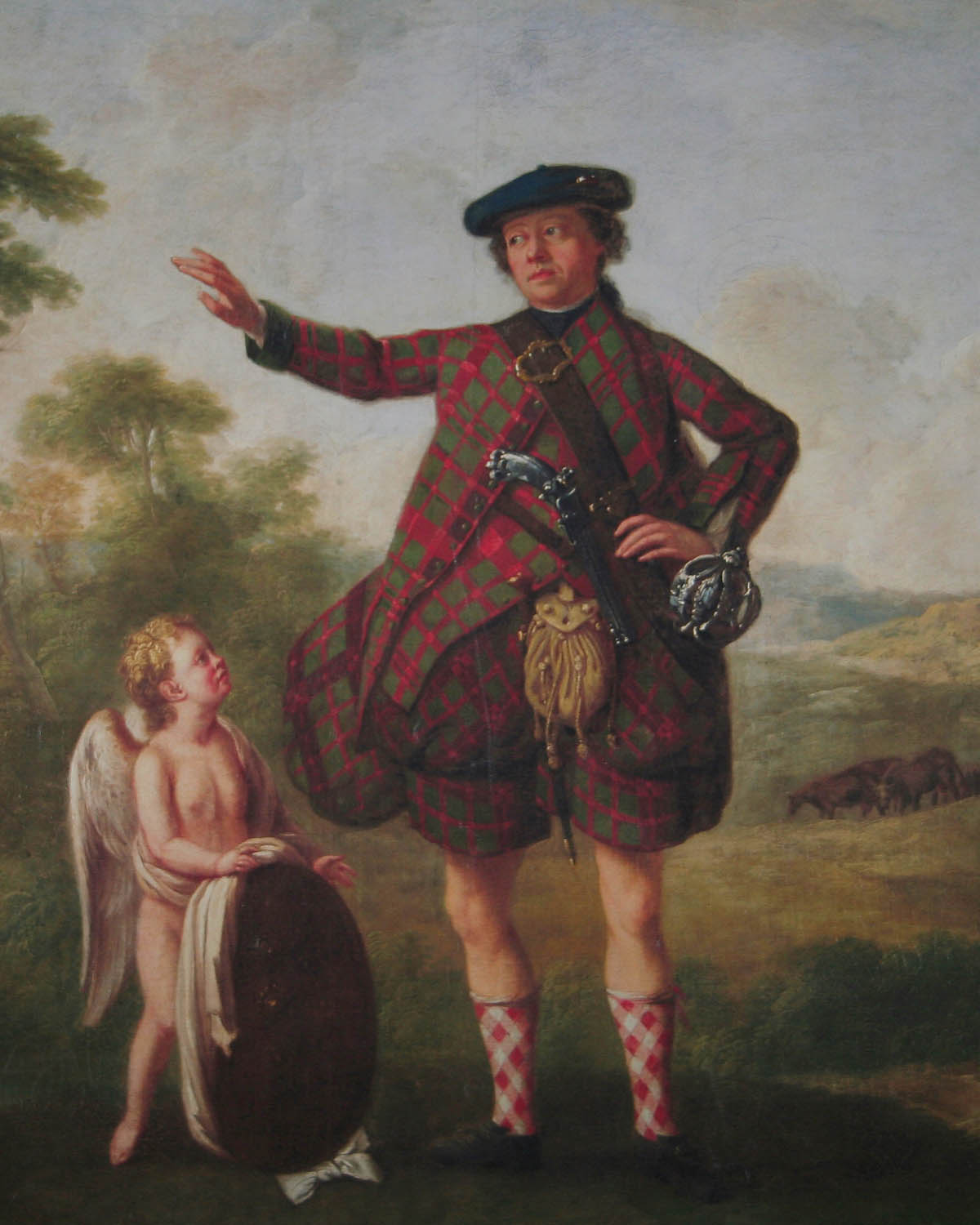
Detail of William Delacour's painting of Dr. Sir Stuart Threipland, of Fingask (1716–1805), physician to Bonnie Prince Charlie during the Jacobite rising of 1745, and President of the Royal Medical Society from 1766 to 1770

William Delacour (also known as William Delacourt or William De la Cour; 1700–1767) was a French painter. He was active from 1741 until 1767. His work is held in the collection of the Cooper-Hewitt, National Design Museum.

== Biography ==
William Delacour is believed to have been either born in France or in Great Britain to French parents. From historical record, it is known that he became active in Great Britain in 1740. It was then that he was painting theatrical scenery. He created scenery for operas by Giovanni Battista Pescetti. He also may have designed works for John Rich. Around 1750, he published eight different books, called Books of Ornaments, about Rococo design.

As of 1752, records show him calling himself a portrait painter. He worked in oil and pastels. He also painted landscapes in Dublin, Glasgow and Edinburgh.

He settled in Edinburgh in March 1760 and was appointed the first Master of the Trustees' Academy. He also worked for private clients, including interior decoration, such as the drawing room of Milton House on the Canongate.

Delacour died in 1767, in Edinburgh.
