= Peter Spalding =

Peter Spalding (1758–1826) was a Scottish colonial trader and philanthropist.

== Life ==
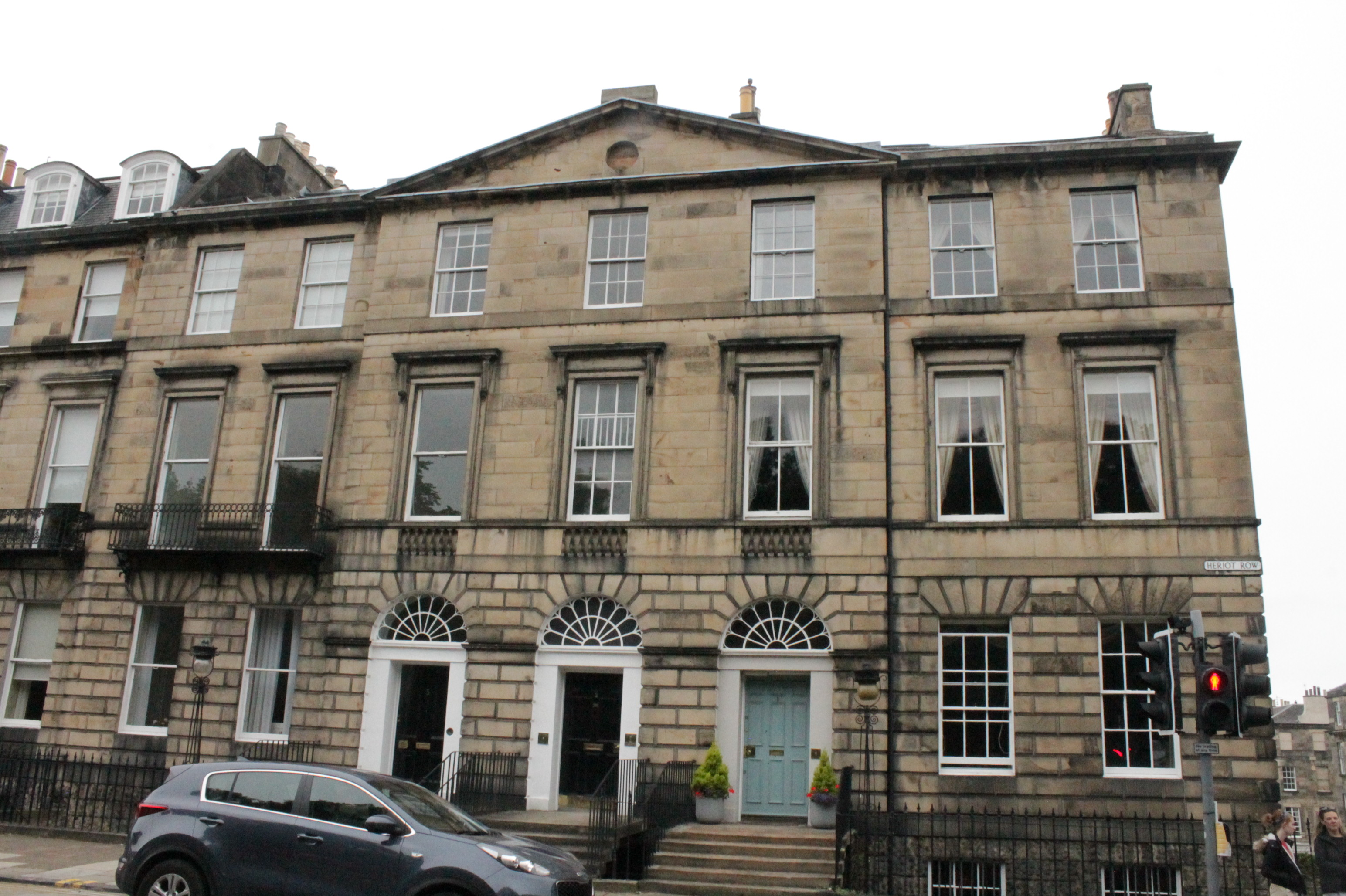
3,2,1 Heriot Row

He appears to have been born in Edinburgh around 1768. The only Spalding in the first Edinburgh Street Directory in 1773 is "James Spalding", a grocer on the High Street. This is presumably his father although some sources say his father was a jeweller, and Peter followed in that trade. Whether that is true or not, Peter ended up trading in India around 1785. He appears to have owned his own vessel and was probably trading in tea and/or spices. However, early in his trading life his ship and all its contents sank in the River Ganges and as he was uninsured, he had to start again. This appears to have inspired rather than dishearten him. He continued to trade and made very good business connections, His friendship with Governor Lord Cornwallis led to Peter being appointed Superintendent of the Calcutta Mint.

By 1785 his mother was living at the head of the West Bow on the Lawnmarket section of the Royal Mile in Edinburgh's Old Town. Peter returned to Edinburgh in 1801 and seemed to have returned to his mother, who moved in 1804 to a newly built apartment at Antigua Street at the head of Leith Walk. By 1805, his mother's tenure as the head of household ended. James Spalding, builder, is listed at the same address (Peter's eldest brother). A Walter Spalding is also listed as a builder at Shakespeare Square at the east end of Princes Street. The latter is probably an uncle or brother.

Whether through these builder connections or through the inheritance from his mother's death, Peter began investing in properties in Edinburgh. In 1808, he was the first occupant of no.1 Heriot Row, which stands on the corner of Heriot Row and Dundas street. This is an extremely elegant ground floor and basement house within the corner pavilion, and is now a category A listed building.

He died at Heriot Row in 1826. He was unmarried and childless but had several properties apart from his home: Atholl Place in the West End, Grassmarket. West Bow, Anchor Close (on the Royal Mile and a block on Lauriston Street. He left the proceeds of these (£6826, around half a million in current terms) to the Royal Institution to provide funds to impoverished or retired artists (on application). This fund was called the Spalding Fund. Two known to specifically benefit were Alexander Nasmyth who received £60 and Andrew wilson who he had commissioned to reladscape the section of Queen Street Gardens which his house looked onto, who received £100.

== Artistic recognition ==
Spalding's portrait by Sir John Watson Gordon is held by the Scottish National Portrait Gallery but is rarely displayed.
