= Henry MacManus =

- Born: c. 1810; Monaghan, County Monaghan
- Died: 22 March 1878 (aged 67–68); Dalkey, Dublin
- Resting place: Enniskerry, County Wicklow
- Known for: landscape painting and teaching

Headteacher of the Glasgow School of Art
- In office 1844 – 1848
- Succeeded by: Charles Heath Wilson

Personal details
- Occupation: Artist, educationalist

Henry MacManus (MRHA) (c. 1810 – 22 March 1878) was an Irish artist and teacher.

== Life ==
Henry MacManus was probably born in Monaghan around 1810. MacManus's friend, Charles Gavan Duffy, stated that he was orphaned when his father, who was a catholic soldier, was killed whilst serving with his regiment. Duffy went on to say that MacManus was then reared in the soldier's hospital in the Phoenix Park as a Protestant, the Royal Hibernian Military School. MacManus was living with Duffy in 1835, attempting to make a living as an artist. He died on 22 March 1878 at his home at 2 Leinster Terrace, Dalkey. He is buried at Enniskerry, County Wicklow.

== Career ==
MacManus's first contribution to the Royal Hibernian Academy (RHA) was in 1835, becoming a member of the Belfast Association of Artists in 1836, exhibiting four portraits with them. He also exhibited at the Royal Academy from 1839 to 1841 as well as the British Institute and the Old Water-colour Society. His paintings featured historical scenes and depictions of everyday Irish life, including works such as May-day at Finglas, Co. Dublin, (1839), and An Irish Market-day, Ballybay, Co. Monaghan (1841). MacManus was employed in London from 1837–1844 and was a head teacher at Somerset House before being appointed headmaster at the new Glasgow School of Design (now the Glasgow School of Art) in 1844. After receiving initial praise followed by a salary increase at the suggestion of the governors, difficulty erupted between MacManus and the school's committee of management. He resigned from the Glasgow School of Design in 1848 and moved to Dublin where he would hold the position as headmaster at the Dublin School of Art until 1862.

MacManus's tenure in Dublin was largely successful, with his establishment of classes for women one of his most noted achievements. Amongst his noted pupils was Mary Alment. He also organised the Royal Dublin Society (RDS) exhibition of arts and industries, and served as superintendent at the new women's industrial school at Carrickmacross, County Monaghan. After 1854, following a reduction in staff by the Department of Science and Art, MacManus complained that the school's reputation was being undermined and that he was overworked. However, the department felt that academic standards were suffering due to a decline in MacManus's health, and pressured the RDS into removing him. MacManus circulated a letter with the press dated 26 June 1862 when the RDS threatened to dismiss him unless he resigned. The letter rallied much support from his former students. He was dismissed by the RDS for improper conduct on 11 July 1862, but reinstated him after an apology. He finally was forced to retire on 30 September 1863, with the title of honorary professor of fine arts.

MacManus was featured regularly with the RHA, becoming an associate in 1835 and a full member in 1858. He was also the RHA professor of drawing from 1873 to 1878. In 1853, he exhibited two plaster sculptures, but he was primarily a landscape artist. Art historian Walter George Strickland stated that MacManus's work was "poor in colour, puerile and even ludicrous", but credits his earlier work with more merit. MacManus also illustrated books, including Hall's Ireland and Carleton's Traits and Stories of the Irish Peasants.

Alongside the sculptor John Hogan, MacManus presented Daniel O'Connell a National Cap at the monster meeting of Mullagh-mast, causing celebre as English journalists insisted on identifying the cap as the crown of Ireland.
