= Andrew Somerville =

Scottish artist (1808–1834)

Andrew Somerville RSA (1808– 14 January 1834) was a short-lived Scottish artist. He is particularly noted for his illustration of Border ballads and several portraits.

== Life ==
He was born in 1808 the son of Andrew Somerville, a wireworker on the Royal Mile in Edinburgh.

He was educated at the High School in Edinburgh, and then studied art at the Trustees Academy on Picardy Place, where he studied under William Simson.

He exhibited at the Royal Scottish Academy from 1830 and was elected an Associate in 1831 and a Fellow in 1833.

At the end of his life ‘’Andrew Somerville, portrait painter, Royal Academy’’ was listed as living at 4 James Square at the east end of Edinburgh's New Town. The property was demolished to build the St James Shopping Centre.

He died at Gloucester Place, Edinburgh on 14 January 1834.

== Family ==
He is thought to have been the nephew of David Somerville, engraver (f.1798-1825).

== Known works ==
See

- Bride of Yarrow
- Bonny Kilmeny (from a poem by James Hogg)
- Donnybrook Fair
- Cottage Children, (National Gallery of Scotland)
- Flowers of the Forest (illustrating the Battle of Flodden), Scottish Art Union
