= Georgina Greenlees =

Scottish artist (1849–1932)

- Born: 13 May 1849; Glasgow, Scotland
- Died: 6 February 1932 (aged 82); London
- Spouse: Graham Kinloch Wylie

Georgina Mossman Greenlees (1849–1932) was a Scottish artist known for her landscape painting. She was an advocate for art education and practice for women.

== Biography ==
Greenlees was the daughter of Robert Greenlees, headmaster of the Glasgow School of Art from 1863 to 1881. Greenlees married Graham Kinloch Wylie, a landscape painter, in October 1885. Greenlees attended the Glasgow School of Art in the early 1870s. She studied painting, design and drawing and was awarded a national Queen's Prize for a lace curtain design in 1870.

Greenlees often painted Scottish landscapes, and was also known for her depictions of women. Her works are held in public collections including A Little Waif, held by the McManus Gallery in Dundee, and a portrait of James Sellars in the Glasgow Museums collection.

Greenlees exhibited at the Royal Academy Summer Exhibition in London during 1878 and 1880. She also exhibited at Royal Glasgow Institute of the Fine Arts in 1867, when she was eighteen, and later at the Royal Scottish Academy. In 1879, Greenlees was elected to the Royal Scottish Society of Painters in Watercolour. She exhibited with the society from 1878, and her work was included in the Fourth Exhibition held in 1881.

Greenlees taught at the Glasgow School of Art from 1874 to 1881, when she was one of two women teaching at the school, who both resigned from their positions. Greenlees maintained a professional artistic career while continuing to teach privately, which was in direct opposition to the policies of the Glasgow School of Art.

Greenlees was a founding member and first president of the Glasgow Society of Lady Artists. The society was formed early in 1882 during a meeting at the studio Georgina shared with her father at 136 Wellington Street, Glasgow. The society was the first of its kind to be formed in Scotland and represented the need for women art practitioners to exhibit their work and socialise with other artists.
