= Charles Heath Wilson =

Anglo-Scottish art teacher and author

Headteacher of the Glasgow School of Art
- In office 1849 – 1863
- Preceded by: Henry MacManus
- Succeeded by: Robert Greenlees

Personal details
- Born: September 1809 London, England, British Empire
- Died: 3 July 1882 (aged 72) Florence, Italy
- Children: 3 daughters and 2 sons
- Parent: Andrew Wilson
- Education: Glasgow School of Art
- Occupation: Artist, educationalist

Charles Heath Wilson (September 1809 – 3 July 1882) was an Anglo-Scottish art teacher and author.

== Life ==
The eldest son of Andrew Wilson, the landscape-painter, he was born in London in September 1809. He studied art under his father, and in 1826 accompanied him to Italy.

After seven years, Wilson returned to Edinburgh, where he practised as an architect, and was for some time teacher of ornament and design in the school of art. In 1835, he was elected Associate of the Royal Scottish Academy, resigning in 1858. In 1840, he visited the continent to make a report to government on fresco painting.

When William Dyce, director and secretary of the recently established schools of art at Somerset House, resigned in 1843, Wilson, who had been director of the Edinburgh school, was appointed his successor. His position there was not much more comfortable than Dyce's had been, and in 1848 he also resigned.

In 1849, Wilson became headmaster of the new Glasgow School of Design. In 1864, the Board of Trade masterships were suppressed and Wilson was pensioned, but continued to live in Glasgow for some years longer, doing architectural work.

In 1869, Wilson and his family left Scotland and settled at Florence, where he was involved with a large literary and artistic circle. For services to art, the cross of the Corona d'Italia was conferred upon him by Victor Emmanuel II of Italy. He died in Florence on 3 July 1882.

== Works ==
His pictorial work was principally landscape in watercolour. He also etched a number of book illustrations, including for Paolo Pifferi's Viaggio Antiquario (Roma, 1832), and James Wilson's Voyage round the Coasts of Scotland (Edinburgh, 1842).

While in Edinburgh Wilson wrote with William Dyce, a pamphlet addressed to Lord Meadowbank, The Best Means of ameliorating the Arts and Manufactures of Scotland. In Glasgow he was occupied for nearly 10 years under the Board of Trade in superintending the filling of the windows of Glasgow Cathedral with Munich pictures in coloured glass. He selected the subjects and wrote a description of the work, which went through numerous editions.

Wilson was interested in Italian art, on which he wrote, and particularly in Michelangelo Buonarroti, on whom he published a biography (London and Florence, 1876; 2nd edit. London, 1881). It began as a compilation from Aurelio Gotti, and developed into an independent work of criticism.

== Family ==
Wilson was twice married: first, on 3 October 1838, in Edinburgh, to Louisa Orr, daughter of Surgeon John Orr, E.I.C., with issue one son and two daughters; and, secondly, on 16 August 1848, also in Edinburgh, to Johanna Catherine, daughter of William John Thomson the portrait-painter, issue a son and a daughter.

== Notes ==
Attribution

This article incorporates text from a publication now in the public domain: Lee, Sidney, ed. (1900). "Wilson, Charles Heath". Dictionary of National Biography. Vol. 62. London: Smith, Elder & Co.
