= Susan Ashworth =

British artist

Susan Ashworth was a 19th-century British artist and educator, active between 1860 and 1880, who divided her career between London and Edinburgh. Sources vary as to Ashworth's place of birth but agree that after spending time in Edinburgh she lived in London for a time before retiring to Edinburgh.

== Biography ==
Ashworth was baptised in 1829 in Salford, Lancashire, the daughter of Thomas Alfred Ashworth, a clerk in holy orders, and his wife Harriet, née Halstead. By the time Susan was eleven, her mother had moved, with Susan and her younger brothers Whitfield, Alfred, Horatio and Howard, to London, possibly as a result of Thomas Ashworth's embrace of the Irvingite doctrine. By the age of twenty-one Susan had been enrolled in classes for women at the Government School of Design in London for some years and had won prizes within the school's examinations, and exhibited designs for fabrics at the 1851 International Exhibition. She was among the first female students to be awarded a scholarship to further her studies in 1852.

Returning to Edinburgh, Ashworth was appointed head of the Trustees' Academy, a Government School of Art and now part of the Edinburgh College of Art, on the retirement of Robert Scott Lauder in 1861. Ashworth painted flowers, landscapes and still-life pieces in both oils and watercolours and between 1864 and 1873 was a regular exhibitor with the Royal Institute of Painters in Watercolours, showing some 27 works there. She also exhibited at least two pieces with the Royal Society of British Artists at their Suffolk Street gallery in London between 1874 and 1880.

Ashworth returned to London in the mid-1870s and continued to paint, exhibiting at the Society of Female Artists until 1880. She died in Hampstead in 1894.
