= Mary Alment =

Irish landscape and portrait artist

- Born: 9 April 1834; Derry, Ireland
- Died: 11 April 1908 (aged 74); Blackrock, Dublin, Ireland
- Known for: landscape and portrait painting

Mary Alment (9 April 1834 – 11 April 1908) was an Irish landscape and portrait artist.

== Life ==
Mary Martha Alment was born on 9 April 1834 in Derry. She was the daughter of William F. Alment and granddaughter of John Alment a Huguenot scientific and mathematical instrument maker. Alment was a student of Henry MacManus whilst attending the Royal Dublin Society (RDS) School of Design. She lived for many years at 47 Carysfort Avenue, Blackrock, Dublin, with Elizabeth Alment her niece and fellow artist. The two Alments both taught art in Dublin. Alment died on 11 April 1908 at home.

== Artistic work ==
Alment worked primarily in watercolour, producing landscapes and portraits. Alment exhibited with the Royal Hibernian Academy from 1858 to 1908. She was also exhibited by the Watercolour Society of Ireland, the Dublin Sketching Club, the RDS Art Exhibition in 1858, the Exhibition of Fine and Ornamental Art in Dublin 1861, and the Irish Artisans' Exhibition in Dublin, 1885. Three of her landscapes were shown at the 1888 Irish Exhibition in London. Many of her works depicts Dublin and north Wicklow, particularly the area around the River Dodder. She also painted scenes from north Wales, as from 1873 she made regular visits there. Alment had studios at 29 and 54 Dawson St, Dublin. The location of many of her works is currently unknown.
