= Trustees' Academy =

Art school in Edinburgh, Scotland

- Type: Art school
- Active: 1760–1903
- Location: Edinburgh, Scotland

The Trustees' Academy was an independent art and trade school in Edinburgh, Scotland, providing tertiary education in art and design. The academy was founded in 1760, reduced in scope in 1892 by a schism, then became defunct in 1903.

Initially the academy was continental in outlook and training, but the fourth Master of the academy David Allan also introduced a Scottish style. Latterly in 1858, English instruction was forced on the school and this initiated a schism. The art school side of the academy split off separately in 1892 as the School of Applied Art and the Trustee Academy solely became a trade and design school. This lasted until 1903 when the Trustees' Academy became the Architecture wing of the School of Applied Art. In 1907 the Scottish Education Department became responsible and founded the new Edinburgh College of Art under Scottish direction once again.

== History ==
Allan Ramsay founded the first 'Art School' in Scotland by opening the Academy of St. Luke in Edinburgh in 1729.

A 'Foulis School' of Design was opened by the University of Glasgow in 1753. It boasted Pierre-Alexandre Aveline and Jean-Pierre Payen as the Masters of the School. A whole session of the college term cost students a guinea and a half.

A similar design school was founded in 1760 by the board of trustees for the Encouragement of Manufacturing in Scotland for Edinburgh. It was originally sited in Picardy Place.

As a manufacturing board set up the design school the original intention was to found a trade school for pupils to learn the likes of house painting, carving, cabinet making, engraving and printing. It promoted art as a means to design patterns for the wool and cotton industries.

The Master of the Academy was however always a fine artist; and this meant that painters as well as engravers and other designers were attracted to the Trustees' Academy as well as tradespeople.

The Fine Arts did become formally established in its own right at the academy in 1798 when a separate Drawing Academy department was introduced.

Like the Academy of St. Luke and the Foulis School of Design before it, the Trustees Academy largely looked to the European continent for inspiration. The French artist William Delacour was the first Master of the Academy; and later the classical training of the Italians was adopted.

The Trustees' Academy moved to the Royal Institution building in 1826.

It held onto that building until the Trustees' Academy became defunct in 1903; when it became an architecture wing of the School of Applied Art. Later when the new Edinburgh College of Art was founded in 1907, the Architecture wing moved there. The Royal Scottish Academy took over the old Royal Institution building in 1911.

=== Decline and end ===
The RSA had long sought the rooms and the teaching space of the Trustees' Academy. In 1858, they persuaded the Trustees that they begin teaching a 'Life School' in Art in the academy building, so that the Antique School became a more elementary Art course. Thus more advanced students took the RSA Life School courses.

In practice, the Trustees' Academy downgraded its art teaching and the Royal Scottish Academy got a foothold in the old Royal Institution building.

Another measure of the Trustees' Academy downgrade was the enforced measure of instruction by the Department of Science and Arts in South Kensington in London. The validation of instruction did help new Art Schools like the Stirling Art School; but the change of focus from Scotland and continental Europe to that of England only hindered the much older Trustees' Academy. Its distinctive character was lost.

This was to cause a schism. The Arts branch of the academy split off and became its own separate school, the School of Applied Art, as Sir Robert Rowand Anderson was dissatisfied with the new teaching; and thus the new art school reverted to traditional Scottish and European teachings.

The Trustees' Academy was now solely a Trade and Design academy. It limped on under English instruction, before it finally became defunct in 1903. The recently founded School of Applied Art consumed the last of its old school as its architecture wing that year. In 1907 the Scottish Education Department became the responsible body, re-cementing the Scottish educational outlook. The SED founded a new art school that year, the former School of Applied Art including a new architecture wing, as the Edinburgh College of Art.

The old Royal Institution building was given over to the Royal Scottish Academy by the National Galleries of Scotland Act in 1906.

== Masters of the Academy ==
Each Master of the Academy was a fine artist that taught students. Each Master brought their own style to bear in their teachings.

- William Delacour, a French artist and the first Master of the Academy.
- Another French artist, Charles Pavillon (1726–1772), was the second Master from 1768. He died on 14 June 1772.
- Alexander Runciman, the third Master of the Academy. He challenged the trade rationale of the academy and sought to promote the fine arts instead.
- David Allan, the fourth Master, normalised tensions at the academy by promoting both branches of trade and art. He was said to introduce a Scottish style to the Trustees' Academy.
- John Wood, the fifth Master did not survive long after the Drawing Academy department was set up. He was dismissed in 1800 just two years later.
- John Graham who was originally in charge of the Drawing Academy in 1798 became the sixth Master of the Academy on Wood's dismissal in 1800.
- Andrew Wilson became Master of the Academy in 1818. He had a broad knowledge of Italian art.
- William Allan was the seventh Master of the Academy. During his tenure the Trustees' Academy moved into the Royal Institution building in 1826. (The building now hosts the Royal Scottish Academy.)
- Alexander Christie was the following Master of the Academy but during his tenure standards began to slip. The RSA, growing in power, convinced the Trustees to split the roles of Design (Trades) and Antique (Arts). In 1851 this was done, and Christie was downgraded to a Director of Design.
- Robert Scott Lauder, the new Director of the Antique, was a harsh but very enthusiastic teacher and under him the Fine Arts teaching and the pupils flourished.
- Christie died in 1860. Charles Doswell Hodder took over as Master of the Academy. He was an English painter, versed in the now mandatory English instruction.
- Lauder retired from teaching in 1861 and was replaced by Susan Ashworth that year.

== Notable alumni ==
- John Brown, painter
- Francis Legat, engraver
- Alexander Nasmyth, painter
- William Simson, painter
- David Octavius Hill, painter and activist
