= William Simson =

Scottish painter (1799–1847)

- Born: 17 October 1799; Dundee, Scotland
- Died: 29 August 1847 (aged 47); London, England

William Simson (17 October 1799 – 29 August 1847) was a Scottish portrait, landscape and subject painter.

== Biography ==
Simson was born at Dundee in on 17 October 1799 and baptised there on 20 October 1799. His parents were Alexander Simson and Jean Wilson. He studied under Andrew Wilson at the Trustees' Academy on Picardy Place in Edinburgh, and his early pictures of landscape and marine subjects found quick sales. He then turned his attention to figure painting, producing the Twelfth of August in 1829, which was followed by Sportsmen Regaling and a Highland Deer-stalker in 1830.

Once finished his studies at the Trustees Academy, he adopted a teaching role there, his pupils including Andrew Somerville RSA.

In 1830 he was elected as a member of the Scottish Academy. Having acquired some means by portrait-painting, he spent three years in Italy. On his return in 1838 he settled in London, where he exhibited his Camaldolese monk showing Relics, Cimabue and Giotto Dutch Family and Columbus and his Child at the Convent of Santa María de la Rábida.

Simson was most talented as a landscapist; his Solway Moss Sunset, exhibited in the Royal Scottish Academy of 1831 and now in the National Gallery in Edinburgh, ranks as one of the finest examples of the early Scottish school of landscape. His elder brother George (1791–1862), a portrait-painter, was also a member of the Royal Scottish Academy, and his younger brother David (died 1874) practised as a landscape-painter.

He died in London on 29 August 1847.

== See also ==
- Robert Scott Lauder
