= Killough (surname) =

Killough is a surname of Irish or Scottish origin. Notable people named Killough include the following:

- Ann Killough (born 1947), American poet
- Beth Killough Chapman (born 1962), American politician
- Clint Killough (born 1993), American football coach
- Lee Killough (born 1942), American novelist
- Lucy Winsor Killough (1897–1989), American economist
- Peter Killough (born 1960), American lawyer
- Stephen Killough, designer of the Killough platform

== See also ==
- Killough, an Irish village, site of Killough railway station
- The Killough massacre, a violent incident in 1838 Texas
- Killough Lewisville High School North, a school in Denton County, Texas
- Kellock, a surname of similar origin and sound
