= Gertrude Annie Lauder =

Scottish painter

- Born: Gertrude Annie Ashton on or aft. 9 August 1855; Camden Town, London, England
- Died: 8 August 1918 (aged 62); Thorntonhall, Scotland
- Known for: Paintings, Miniatures
- Spouse: Charles James Lauder
- Awards: Lauder Prize, founder

Gertrude Annie Lauder (née Ashton; 1855 - 8 August 1918) was an English-born Scottish painter, born in Camden Town, England. She moved to Glasgow, Scotland: where she joined the Glasgow Society of Lady Artists; married the artist Charles James Lauder; and exhibited in the Royal Scottish Academy. On her death she left legacies to the Scottish Artists Benevolent Association, gave a fund to the Glasgow Art Club and left a fund to the Glasgow Society of Lady Artists to encourage art by women. The Lauder Prize, named for the best work adjudged in the Glasgow Society of Lady Artists annual exhibition, is named after her.

== Life ==
Lauder was the daughter of a stockbroker. Her parents were Alfred Ashton (born c. 1822) and Mary Hyatt (born c. 1833). They had 5 children, including Gertrude.

After studying at the Royal Female School of Art in London, sometime after 1891, she moved to Scotland. She joined the Glasgow Society of Lady Artists.

In 1902 she was staying at 257 West George Street, Glasgow.

She married Charles James Lauder (1843 - 27 April 1921) on 30 September 1903. They had married in Haslemere in Surrey. She was Charles' second wife, his first wife was Mary McCallum.

The couple obtained another house 'Asolo' in Thortonhall, South Lanarkshire. They still used the West George Street address as a city address when needed.

== Art ==
Lauder went to the Female School of Art in Queensquare, London. She won the second prize for her studies of flowers and another 4th place prize in 1880. In the 1881 census in England her occupation is listed as Art Student.

In 1902 she exhibited a case of miniatures at the Royal Scottish Academy exhibition.

She exhibited King William's State Bedroom, Hampton Court Palace at the RSA in 1907.

The following year in 1908 she exhibited A Fishing Quarter, Venice.

Her last exhibit at the RSA was Don Carlos' Palace, Venice in 1910.

At the Glasgow Society of Lady Artists exhibition in March 1911 at 5 Blythswood Square, Lauder exhibited 'several clever watercolour sketches'.

In 1913, Lauder had an exhibition of her work at Annan's Gallery in Sauchiehall Street, Glasgow. The Queen, a newspaper for women, reported it:

Pictures by Mrs Gertrude Lauder. An interesting collection of pictures by Mrs Gertrude Lauder, whose husband is also a well known painter, is at present on view at Annan's Gallery, Sauchiehall Street, Glasgow. The pictures shown are watercolours, and the subjects have been well chosen and skilfully treated by the artist, who has made much of her travels in various lands. Some of the most charming examples of Mrs Lauder's work are Italian, and, like others who have lived in that land of surpassing beauty, she has obviously fallen completely under the fascinations of its old beautiful buildings, sunlit skies, and magic atmosphere. Venice especially has enthralled her, and the results of her stay in that dear city of lagoons are calculated to delight all who visit the exhibition. The Great Tower, St. Mark’s almost as a matter of course, receives a place of honour. The Mother Church, Torcello, The Double Pulpit and The Baptistry are other subjects ably treated, while Venice Looking to St. Giorgio is a delightful bit of work. Rome, Athens, Jerusalem all receive loving attention. Mrs Lauder, however, does not confine herself entirely to painting sunny southern scenes, but has also some pleasing pictures of picturesque corners in England and Scotland. Crail in Miniature is a dainty and pleasing picture of the well-known Scottish seaport.

The March 1914 exhibition of the Glasgow Society of Lady Artists saw Lauder exhibit more paintings of Venice and Rome.

== Death ==
She died of a cerebral haemorrhage on 8 August 1918 at her home 'Asolo' in Thorntonhall. Her age on the death certificate is recorded as 62, indicating that her date of birth was in the period 9 August - 31 December 1855.

The Daily Record of 8 April 1921 reported on Gertrude Lauder's legacies:

HELP FOR SCOTS ARTISTS. Two legacies, amounting to £6422, have been left to the Scottish Artist Benevolent Association by the late Mrs. Gertrude Annie Lauder, Glasgow. One legacy, amounting to £1422, is solely for the relief of distressed lady artists and their dependants. The capital fund of the association, apart from the Mrs. Lauder Fund, amounts to £24,902, an increase of £7805 since last year, stated Mr. J. Whitelaw Hamilton, presiding at a meeting of the association yesterday.

The value of her estate in the Scottish National Probate Index was found at £10,984, 11 shillings and 7 pence.

The Weekly Dispatch of London gave a further breakdown of Lauder's legacies:

Legacies to encourage art. Legacies left by Mrs Gertrude Annie Ashton Lauder of Thorntonhall, Lanarkshire, whose personal estate was valued at £10, 984, include: £1000 to Glasgow Art Club for a Gertrude Annie Lauder fund for younger artist members of the club. £250 to Glasgow Ladies Artist Club for a Gertrude Annie Lauder fund to encourage art. £1500 to Scottish Artists Benevolent Association for a Gertrude Annie Lauder distress fund.

== The Lauder Prize ==
The annual Glasgow Society of Lady Artists exhibition named a prize in Lauder's honour. The Lauder Prize went to the best adjudged work of their annual exhibition. The first award of the Lauder Prize was in 1921 to Jessie King with her work Pipes of June.

== Works ==
Works such as Feeding the Pigeons outside The Palace, and The Market, Knaresborough are known.

TheSketch of Captain Cook's cottage, Staithes, Yorkshire is in the National Library of New Zealand.
