= James Docharty =

Scottish landscape painter (1829–1878)

James Docharty ARSA (1829–1878) was a Scottish landscape painter.

He was born at Bonhill, near Dumbarton, in 1829. He first worked for his father as a designer of calico fabric. Docharty did not turn to art till 1862. His works appeared at the Edinburgh Academy, the Glasgow Institution, and the Royal Academy. In 1876 failing health caused him to visit the Continent and the East. He did some promising sketches in Egypt in 1876. Docharty was elected an Associate of the Royal Scottish Academy in 1877. He was the uncle of Alexander Brownlie Docharty, who was based at James' studio in 1885. He died from pulmonary illness in Glasgow in 1878. Amongst his best works are:

- The Haunt of the Red Deer. 1869.
- The Head of Loch Lomond. 1873.
- Glencoe. 1874.
- The River Achray. 1876.
- A Good Fishing Day. 1877.
- A Salmon Stream. 1878.

== Critical commentary ==
Critics said he used colour effectively, while his weak point was composition. He depicted nature with realism.
