= Alexander Christie (artist) =

Scottish painter

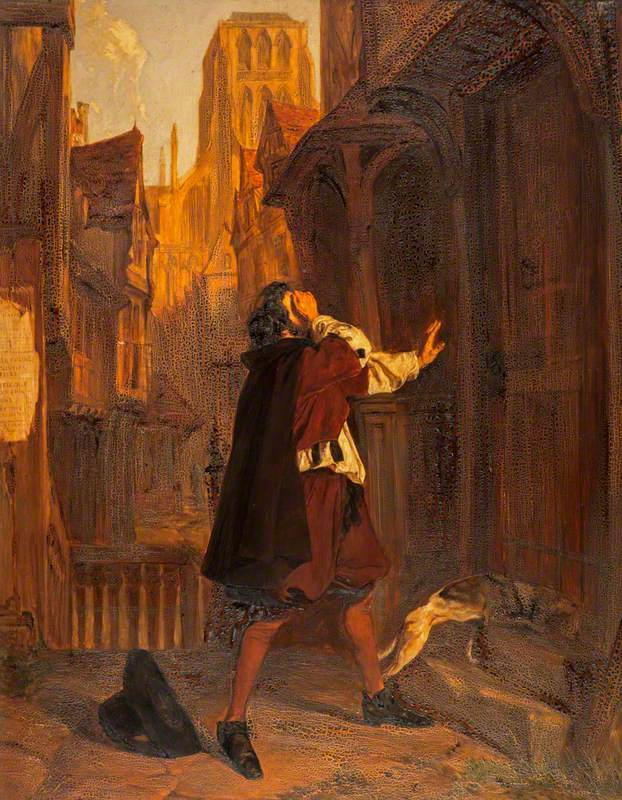
- "An Incident in the Great Plague of London", by Alexander Christie in 1840
- Born: 12 April 1807; Edinburgh, Scotland
- Died: 5 May 1860 (aged 53); Edinburgh, Scotland

Alexander Christie (12 April 1807 – 5 May 1860) was a Scottish painter.

== Life ==
He was eldest son of David Christie. His mother was Isabella Don. David and Isabella married on 14 October 1803 in Edinburgh.

Alexander was a grand-nephew of Hugh Christie, and was born in Edinburgh on 12 April 1807.

He was educated at Edinburgh Academy and the University of Edinburgh. Intended for the law, he served an apprenticeship to a writer to the signet, but was never admitted to the Society.

== Art ==
His father's death allowed Christie to follow his own wishes and concentrate on art. Giving up his legal prospects, in 1833 he entered as a pupil at the Trustees' Academy in Edinburgh, then under the direction of Sir William Allan. After studying in London and Paris he returned to Edinburgh and settled there.

In 1843, Christie was appointed an assistant, and in 1845, in succession to Thomas Duncan, RSA, first master or director of the ornamental department of the School of Art, under the board of trustees for manufactures in Scotland. In 1848, he was elected an associate of the Royal Scottish Academy, where for some years one or more of his pictures appeared in every exhibition. He exhibited only once in the Royal Academy in London, sending in 1853 A Window-seat at Wittemburg, 1526—Luther, the married priest.

== Death ==
He died on 5 May 1860 in Edinburgh.

He was buried on 10 May 1860 in Canongate Cemetery, Edinburgh.

== Works ==
One of his pictures, An Incident in the History of the Great Plague, went to the National Gallery of Scotland, as did the artist's copy of a large picture painted as an altar-piece for the chapel at Murthly Castle, The Apparition of the Cross to Constantine. Several of the illustrations of the Abbotsford edition of The Bride of Lammermoor are from his designs.

Christie delivered courses of lectures at the Philosophical Institution in Edinburgh, and elsewhere, on subjects connected with art. A paper by him On the Adaptation of previous styles of Architecture to our present Wants was in the Transactions of the Architectural Institute of Scotland, vol. iii. (1854).
