= Dorothy Carleton Smyth =

Scottish artist (1880–1933)

Dorothy Smyth
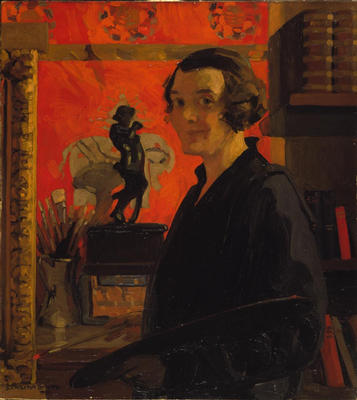
- Self-portrait, age 41 (1921) oil on canvas
- Born: 1 March 1880; Cambuslang, Scotland
- Died: 15 February 1933 (aged 52); Cambuslang, Scotland
- Education: Manchester School of Art, 1892-1893; Glasgow School of Art, 1898-1902
- Known for: Theatre, Costume Design
- Movement: Arts and Crafts Movement; Golden Age of Illustration

Dorothy Carleton Smyth (1880 – 16 February 1933) was a Scottish artist, a compatriot of Charles Rennie Mackintosh, active in theatrical and costuming design, and one of the leading lights at the Glasgow School of Art during the post WWI period. Her association with the Arts & Crafts Movement in England and Scotland, together with her work in fine book-binding, illustration, and faculty leadership at the GSA, place her at the hub of the Golden Age of Illustration. Named, in 1933, as GSA's first female director—by a unanimous vote of the School's governing board—her tragic early death by brain hemorrhage in that same year deprived Scotland of an accomplished, active and internationally respected proponent of Scottish art.

== Early life and family ==
Smyth was born in Cambuslang near Glasgow in 1880 to Elizabeth Ramage and a jute manufacturer, William Hugh Smyth; her parents originated from France and Ireland, respectively. Although the family moved to Manchester in the 1880s, Smyth returned to Glasgow to study, as did her sister, Olive (1882–1949), who also became an artist . A third sister, Rose, became a composer.

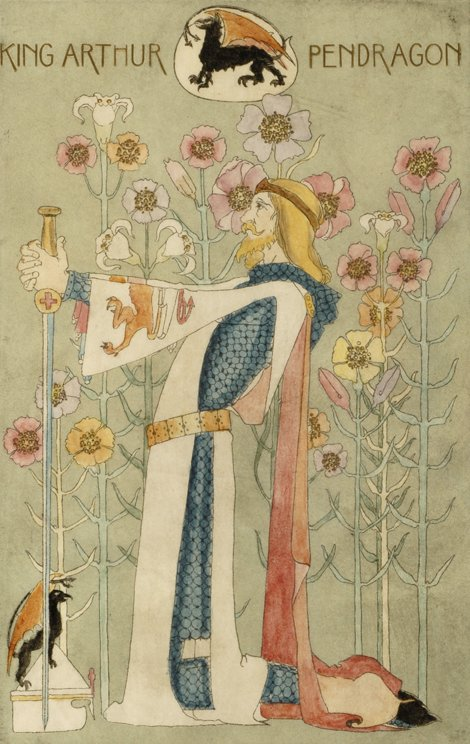
The Poems of Alfred, Lord Tennyson (1899), cover art by Dorothy C. Smyth, front cover

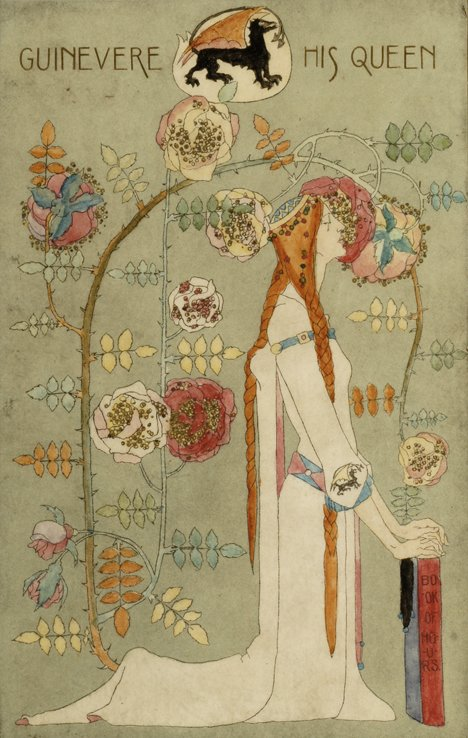
The Poems of Alfred, Lord Tennyson (1899), cover art by Dorothy C. Smyth, back cover

== Education: The Arts & Crafts Movement ==
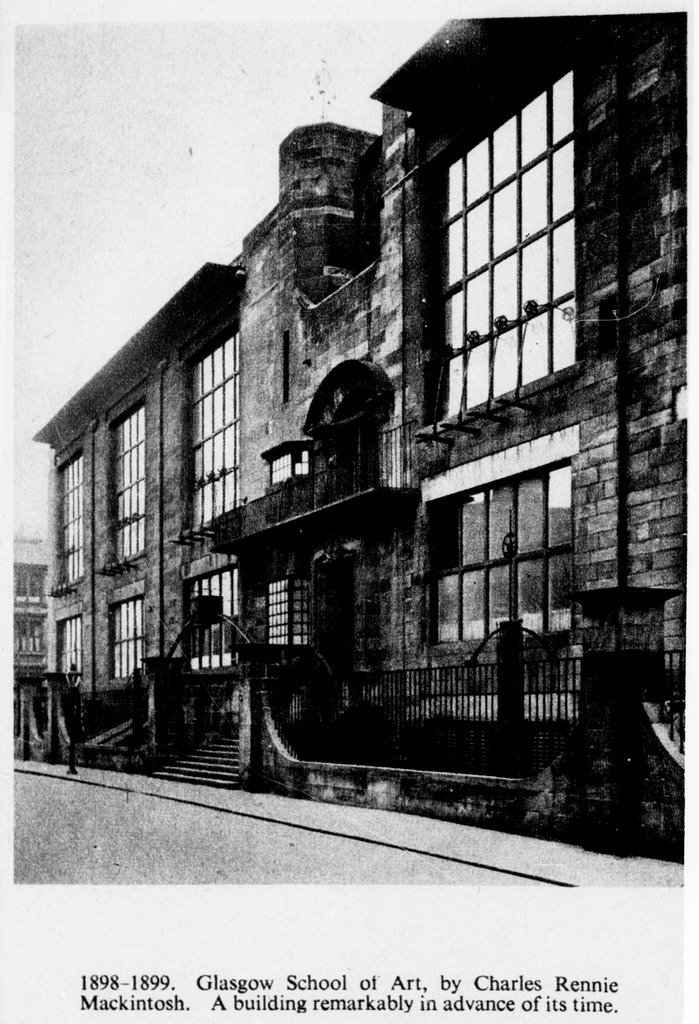
The Glasgow School of Art, where Smyth studied and later taught.

Between 1885 and 1893 Smyth attended the Colonel Clark's School in Manchester and the Manchester High School for Girls. She studied under Walter Crane at the Manchester School of Art between 1893 and 1897. Crane, an advocate of the Arts and Crafts Movement, espoused the practical application of the arts for books, clothing, and the use of artisanal craft in all aspects production.

Smyth's work during this period for bookbinder Cedric Chivers, a publisher of handcrafted editions of popular works such as The Poems of Alfred, Lord Tennyson and The Jungle Book by Rudyard Kipling, was a natural extension of her work with Crane. Smyth was already such an accomplished illustrator that she was entrusted with interior design-work (as in her illustrations to Chivers's Jungle Book edition) as well as designs for the elaborately hand-colored covers of these vellucent books.

The Arts and Crafts Movement was additionally an advocate for developing a sense of place; it is therefore not surprising that, following these first years of training, Smyth,, chose, at the age of 18, to return to Scotland and her early home, to continue her studies at the Glasgow School of Art (GSA).

By the time she had begun her study at Glasgow (1898), Smyth's interest had become focused on theatre and costume design, "her fascination with exotic clothes" leading her to active participation in the many student-produced plays and masques within the school.

== Career ==
Smyth's work, with its elegant, art nouveau aesthetic, stood out from her student days. Her stained glass window Tristan and Iseult was selected for exhibition at the Glasgow International Exhibition (1901), even before she had received her diploma. Following her graduation from GSA (1902), an anonymous female patron paid for her membership in the Glasgow Society of Lady Artists and financed her travel to Florence, Paris, and Switzerland to "study the European masters". In 1903, she was commissioned by Craibe Angus to exhibit in Turin, Cork, Toronto and Budapest. Later that same year, through the GSLA, Smyth would meet F.R. Benson, a theatrical producer who hired Smyth for his touring company. She would spend the next decade traveling and producing costume-work.

=== Touring with the Theatre Companies, 1904-1914 ===
Smyth's work for Benson including the costumes for a number of Shakespearean festivals in Stratford, for Benson and other theatrical companies, as well as work for pageants, festivals, and the "tableaux" that remained popular during this period.

Alongside this travel, Smyth retained her Glaswegian connections. In 1912, she was in Glasgow, organizing the committee for a holiday "pageant tableau," working for the Glasgow Repertory Company, and the Quinlan Opera Company. With her sister, Olive, and several other female artists from Glasgow, Smyth helped found the Sister Studios which offered classes in a variety of disciplines including metalwork, embroidery and ceramic decoration. This work gave Smyth detailed managerial experience that would serve her well on her permanent return to Glasgow to take up a teaching post at her old school.

=== Gallery: Theatrical Costumes ===
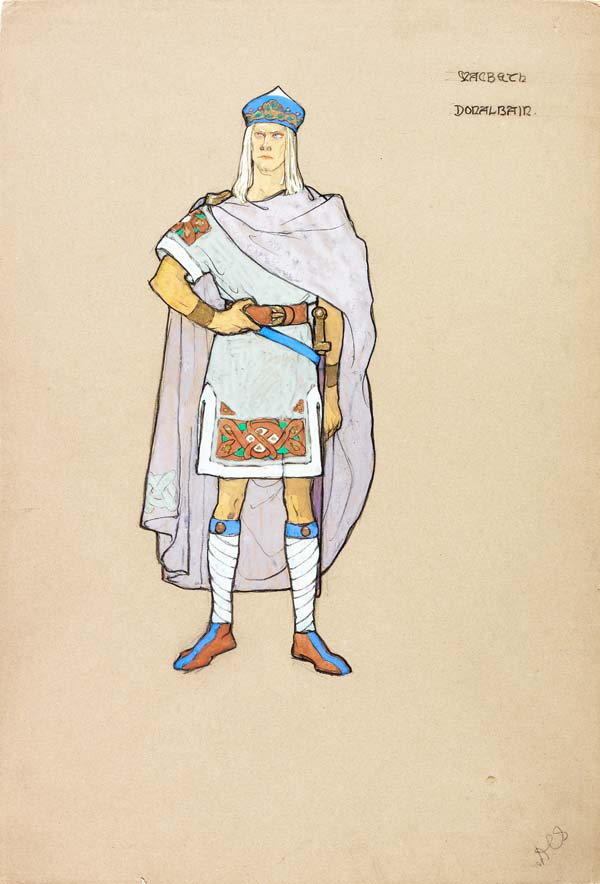
Costume design for Donalbain.

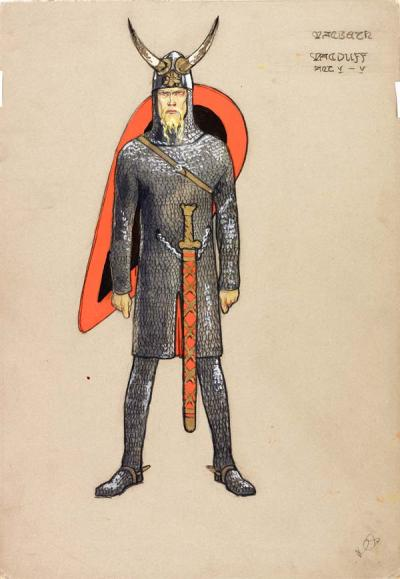
Costume design for Macduff, from Shakespeare's Macbeth.

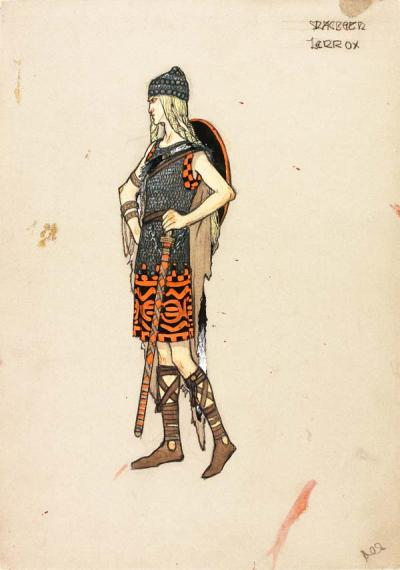
Costume design for Lennox, from Shakespeare's Macbeth.

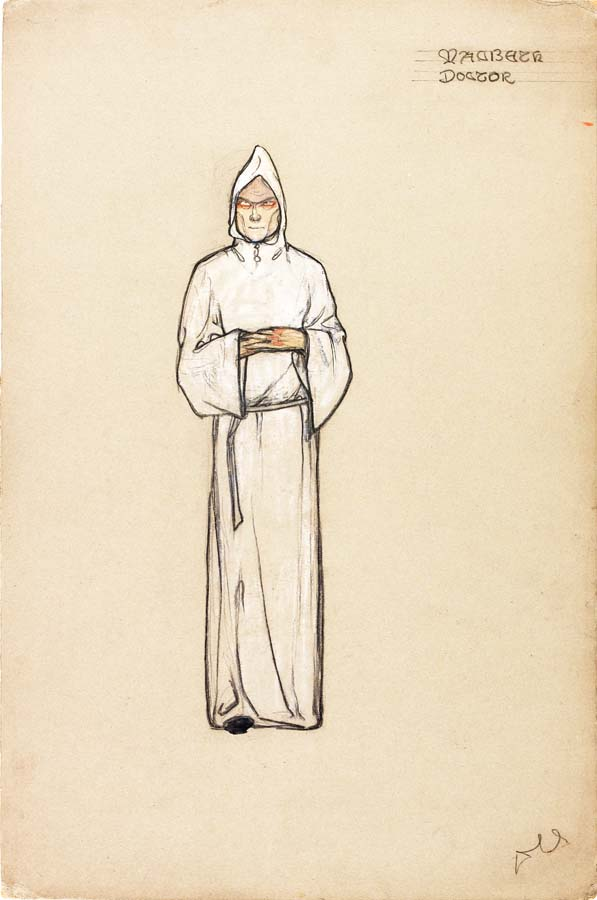
Costume design for the English Doctor, from Shakespeare's Macbeth.

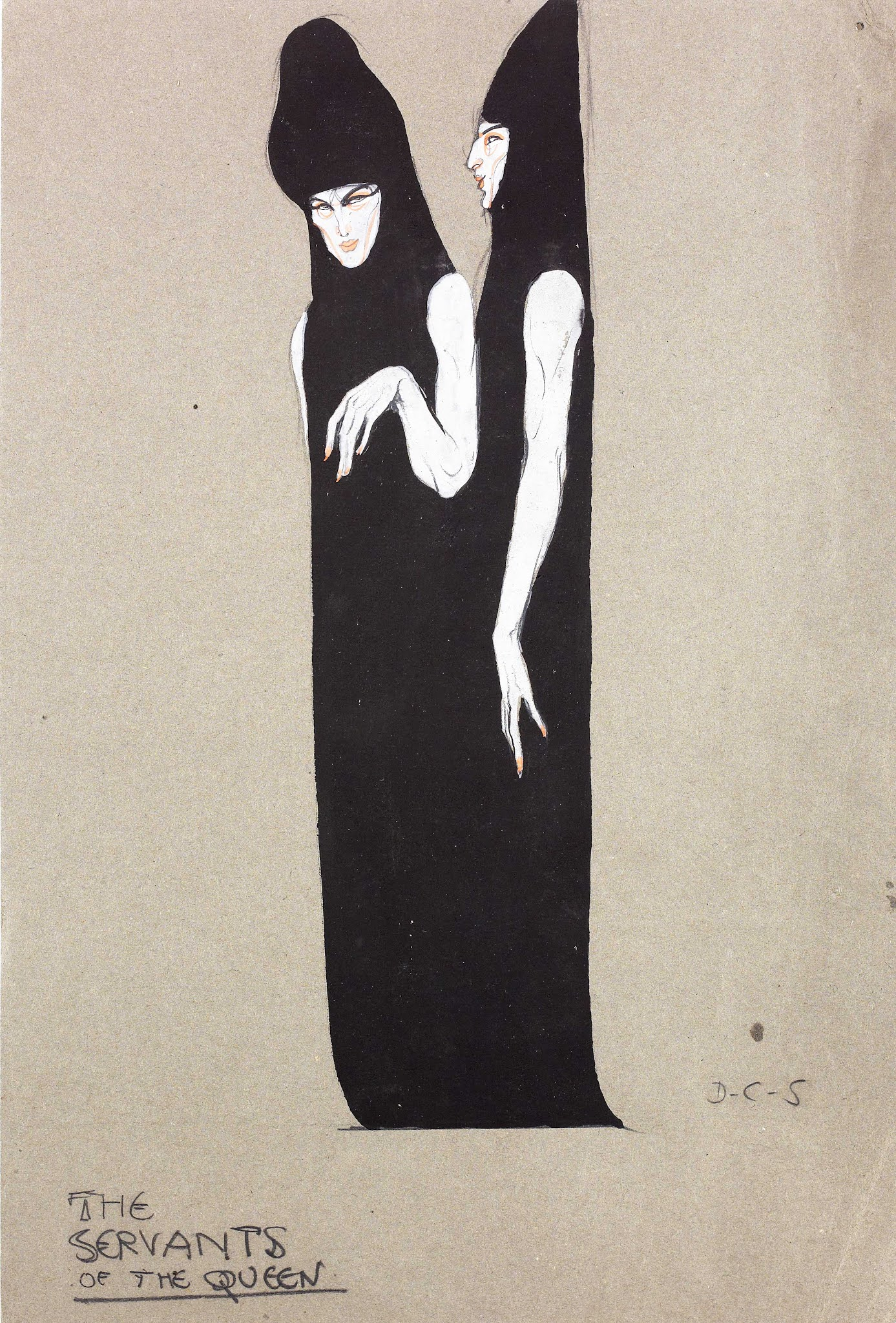
Dorothy C Smyth, Servants of the Queen, Costume Design for Oscar Wilde's Salome

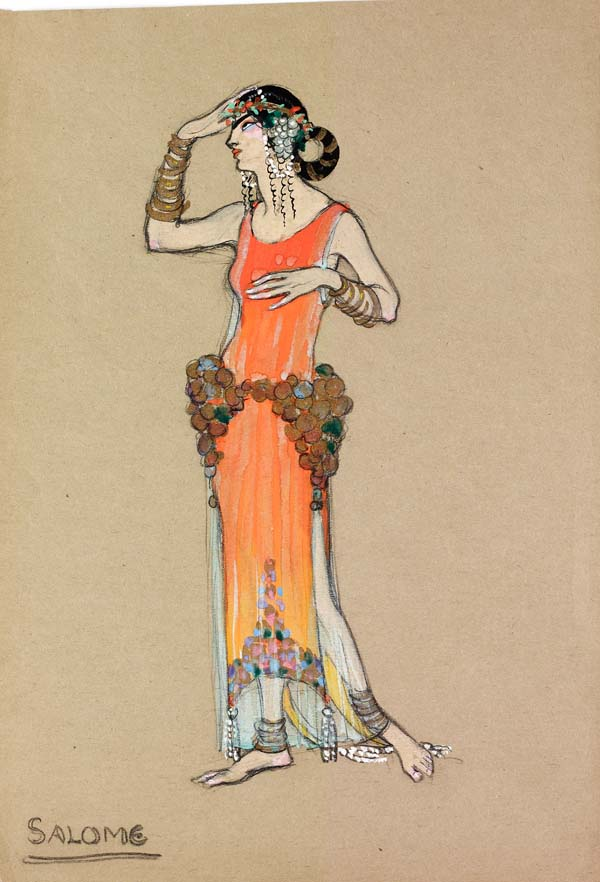
Dorothy C Smyth, Salome, Costume Design for Oscar Wilde's Salome.

=== Teaching and Work in Illustration ===
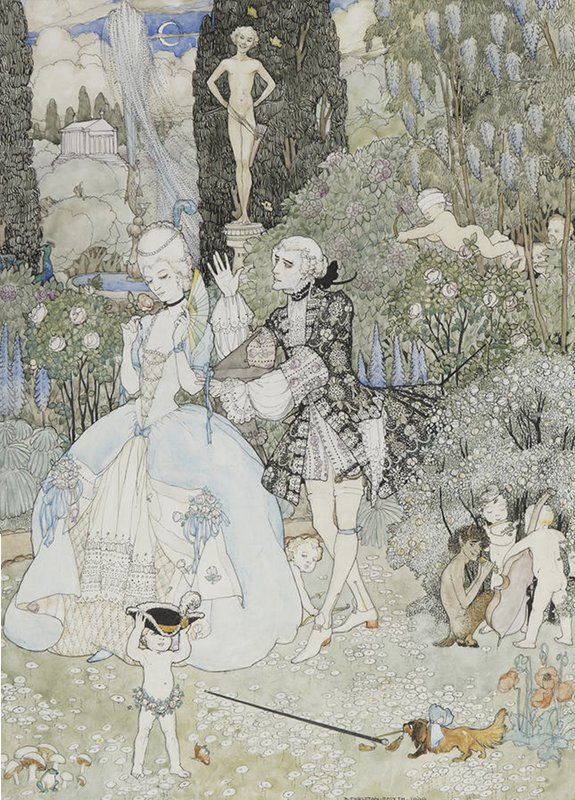
Dorothy C Smyth, Cupid's Garden (1909)

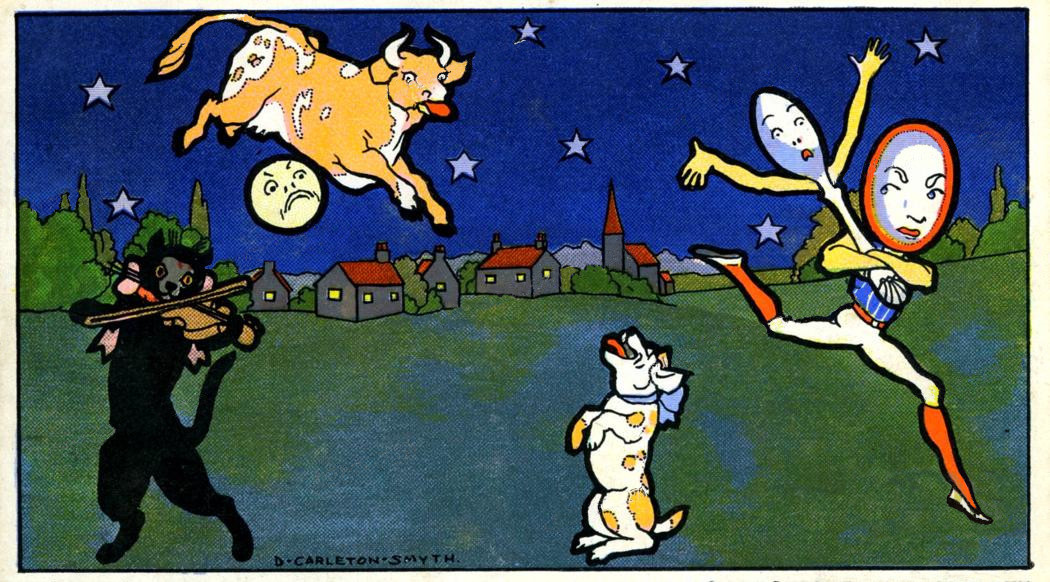
Dorothy C. Smyth, "Hey Diddle Diddle."

In 1914, she returned to GSA to teach, simultaneously continuing her work as a professional artist creating "book illustrations, sculptures, silverwork and portraits" for commercial businesses and private individuals.

=== Leadership Appointments at the GSA ===
In 1927, Smyth was appointed head of the Commercial Art Department (1927), where she remained until 1933.

In early 1933, Smyth was offered the full Directorship of GSA, "perhaps the first women to be offered such a post within a higher education institution." Smyth accepted, however, she died little more than a month later, from a massive brain hemorrhage.

== Legacy ==
Smyth lived with her sisters for much of her life. Olive Smyth was also at GSA during this period, teaching fashion.

In 1921, aged 41, she painted Self Portrait. This piece shows her in her studio with brushes, canvas and paint palette, and smiling at the onlooker. Olive Carleton Smyth presented the painting to Glasgow Museums in 1948.

Following Smyth's untimely death on February 16, 1933, in her Cambuslang home, W.O. Hutchinson took up GSA Directorship. Considering "the glowing reports regarding her work and teaching. We can only wonder what the School would have been like now if it had had its first female director in 1933!"

Olive took up the position of Head of Design at GSA.

She was highly praised and supported by Fra Newbury. Her circle has posthumously been described as the 'Glasgow Girls' group of artists.
