= Robert Greenlees =

Scottish artist and educationalist

Headteacher of the Glasgow School of Art
- In office 1863 – 1881
- Preceded by: Charles Heath Wilson
- Succeeded by: Thomas Simmonds

Personal details
- Born: 1820
- Died: 6 September 1894 (aged 73–74)
- Education: Glasgow School of Art
- Occupation: Artist, educationalist

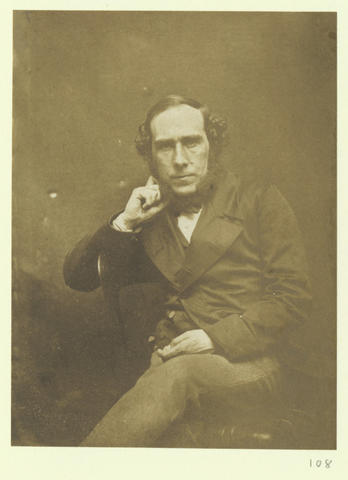
Robert Greenlees, teacher and educationalist and Headmaster of the Glasgow School of Art in 1881. This image was taken by Duncan Brown, a janitor and keen amateur photographer at the GSA.

Robert Greenlees (1820– 6 September 1894) was a Scottish artist and educationalist. He was employed at the Glasgow School of Art as a pupil teacher, both teaching and studying. Greenlees taught drawing in the elementary classes, and became the Second Master. In 1863 the headmaster of the school, Charles Heath Wilson, retired and Greenlees was appointed his successor. He was the headmaster until 1881.

Initially Greenlees worked in stained glass. He later moved to landscape painting in oils and watercolours.

Greenlees advocated for the attendance of women pupils at life classes, and appointed four female teachers at the school. His daughter Georgina was one of the teachers. Greenlees also introduced the teaching of nautical draughtsmanship – a number of designers at the Clyde shipyards were graduates of the school. One of his pupils was the landscape artist Alexander Brownlie Docharty while another was the noted landscape artist Archibald Kay.
