= William Kellock Brown =

British sculptor

- Born: William Brown; 15 December 1856; Glasgow, Scotland
- Died: 20 February 1934 (aged 77); Glasgow, Scotland
- Education: Glasgow School of Art; Royal College of Art; Royal Academy Schools
- Known for: Sculpture

William Kellock Brown (15 December 1856 – 20 February 1934) was a Scottish sculptor prominent in late Victorian Glasgow, with many public works. His brother was the landscape artist Alexander Kellock Brown. He exhibited at the Royal Academy and Royal Scottish Academy. His sculptures are frequently simply initialled WKB. He was commissioned to create several Scottish war memorials in the early 1920s. He received an important commission from Glasgow Corporation in 1905–06, adding ornament to several public libraries in the city.

== Biography ==
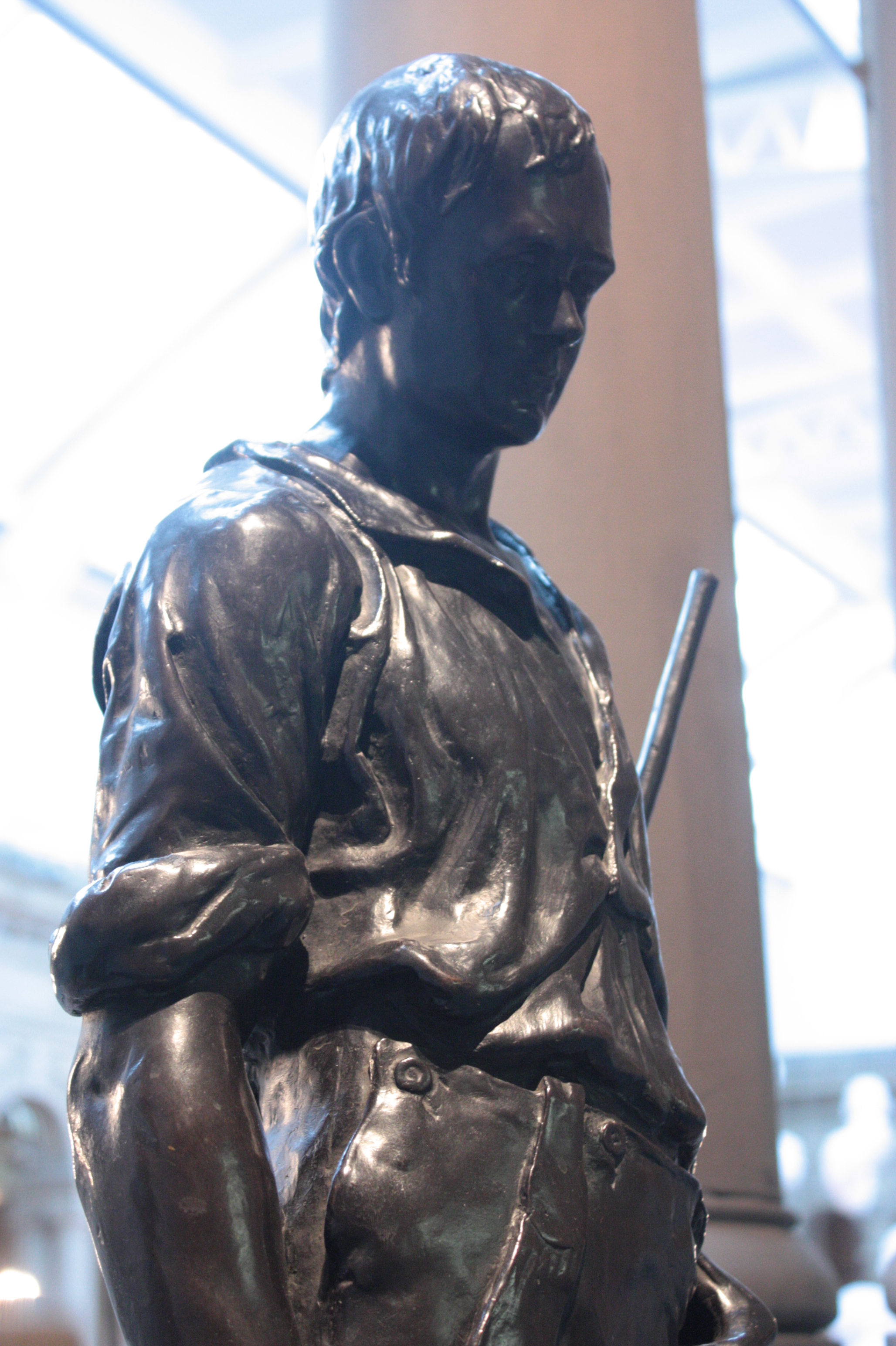
Robert Burns the Thresher, 1890

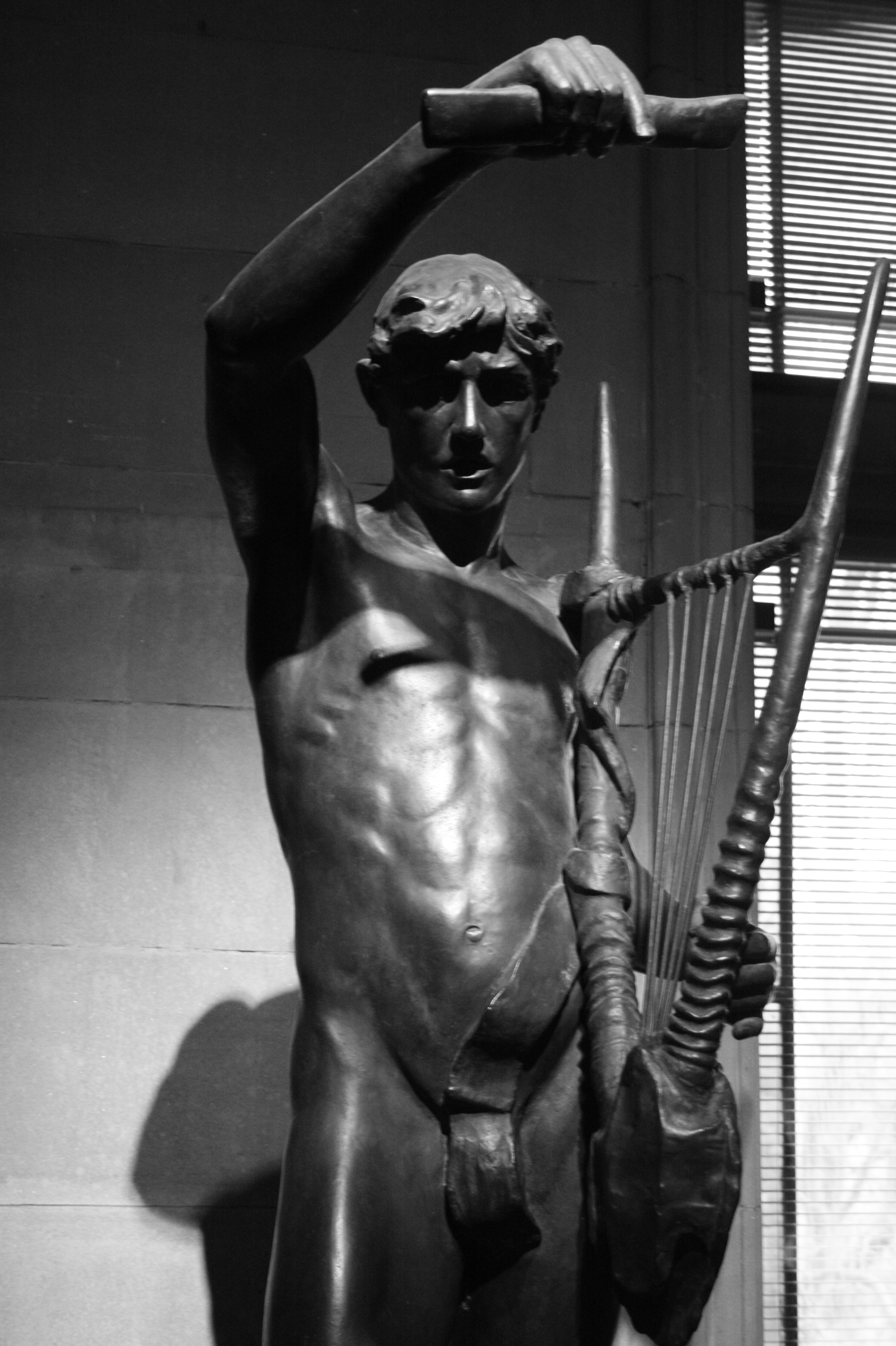
Melody, 1894, Kelvingrove Art Gallery and Museum

Born William Brown in Glasgow on 15 December 1856 (some sources state 1859) he later adopted the name Kellock, from his mother's family, to distinguish himself from other William Brown's active in the region. His father was originally a journeyman brass worker in Edinburgh but around 1853 he relocated to Glasgow to become a partner in Kenny & Brown, a firm of art metal workers.

William Kellock Brown studied at the Glasgow School of Art from 1867 and later under Édouard Lantéri at the Royal College of Art in London and then at the Royal Academy Schools. While studying in London he created decorative balconies for the Savoy Hotel in 1888 and also exhibited a work in Liverpool. Later that year he returned to Glasgow, where he taught modelling at the Glasgow School of Art until 1894, immediately prior to its relocation to the building designed by Charles Rennie Mackintosh.

Throughout the 1890s and 1900s Kellock Brown, working in Glasgow, created portrait busts, figure studies and larger works including a memorial sculpture to Thomas Carlyle in Kelvingrove Park. During his career he completed a number of architectural commissions in Glasgow. These included figures for the Athenaeum in Buchanan Street completed in 1893, a series of classical figures for the parapet of the People's Palace between 1893 and 1898 and the external decoration for six Glasgow Corporation libraries. Smaller memorials by Kellock Brown, including one to the victims of the Titanic Disaster in 1912 and a statue of David Livingstone in 1913, were followed by a number of war memorials after the First World War.

From 1892 Kellock Brown was a member of the Art Workers Guild and was associated with the Scottish Society of Art Workers and exhibited works at the Royal Scottish Academy. In 1898 John Lavery nominated him as a member in the Royal Society of British Sculptors. Kellock Brown died of a heart attack in 1934 in Cambridge Street, Glasgow.

== Selected works ==
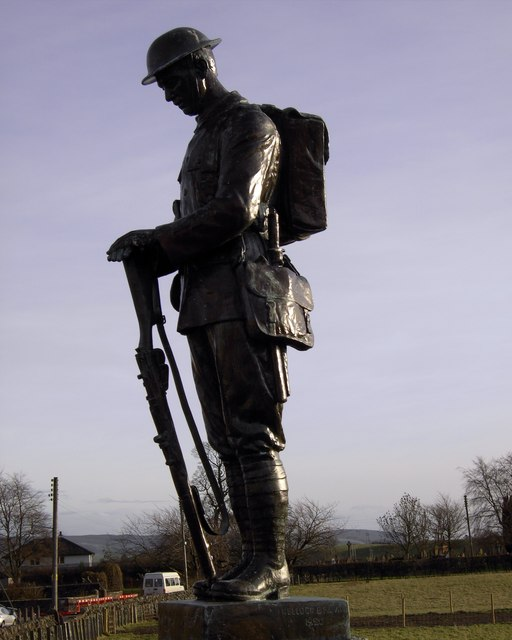
Penpont war memorial, 1920

- Ornamental ironwork on the Savoy Hotel in London (1888)
- Statue of Robert Burns as "The Thresher", Kelvingrove Art Gallery, Glasgow (1890)
- Monumental figures on J J Burnet’s New Athenaeum, 179 Buchanan Street, Glasgow (1892)
- John Watson Memorial Fountain, Hamilton (1893)
- Monumental figures on the Sanitary Chambers, Montrose Street, Glasgow (1895)
- Monument to Rev Dr George Stewart Burns, Glasgow Cathedral (1896)
- Monumental figures on the People's Palace, Glasgow (1898)
- Statue of Flora MacDonald (1898)
- Monumental figures on the Castle Chambers, 59–69 Renfield Street, Glasgow (1900)
- Entrance pediment, Parkhead Library, Glasgow (1904–1906)
- Sculpture on Woodside District Library, Glasgow (1905)
- Sculpture on Govanhill District Library, Glasgow (1906)
- Sculpture on Bridgeton District Library, Glasgow (1906)
- Sculpture on Dennistoun District Library, Glasgow (1906)
- Portrait statuette of Cameron of Lochiel (1911)
- Cenotaph to John Robertson, Glasgow Necropolis (1912)
- The Titanic Disaster Memorial, in the former Institute of Engineers and Shipbuilders, Elmbank Crescent, Glasgow (1913)
- Statue of David Livingstone, Livingstone Memorial Church, Blantyre (1913)
- Sketch model of Frederick Roberts, 1st Earl Roberts (1915)
- Memorial to Thomas Carlyle in Kelvingrove Park, Glasgow (1916)
- Statue of General Maximo Gomez, Liberator of Cuba (1919)
- Penpont War Memorial (1921)
- Kilmaurs War Memorial (1921)
- Monument to Thomas Andrew Millar, Glasgow Necropolis (1922)
- Alyth War memorial (1922)
- Inverary War Memorial (1922)
- Largs War Memorial (1922)
- Johnstone War Memorial (1924)
