= Stansmore Dean Stevenson =

Scottish painter (1866–1944)

- died 1944
- Born: Stansmore Richmond Leslie Dean; 3 June 1866; Glasgow, Scotland
- Died: 15 December 1944 (aged 78); Castle Douglas, Scotland
- Education: Glasgow School of Art
- Alma mater: Glasgow School of Art; Académie Colarossi
- Notable work: Meditation, Pensive, Neil Munro
- Movement: Glasgow Girls
- Spouse: Robert Macaulay Stevenson

Stansmore Richmond Leslie Dean Stevenson (3 June 1866 – 15 December 1944) was a Scottish artist known for her oil paintings. She was a member of a group of women artists and designers known as the Glasgow Girls.

== Biography ==
Stansmore Richmond Leslie Dean was born in Glasgow on 3 June 1866, the youngest of six children of Jean Leslie and Alexander Davidson Dean (1814–1910). Her father was an artist and engraver from Aberdeen who co-founded the Gilmour and Dean Ltd printing company in 1846. She studied at the Glasgow School of Art from 1883 to 1889 where her contemporaries included Bessie MacNicol and Charles Rennie Mackintosh. In 1890 she was the first female student to win the School's Haldane Travelling Scholarship bursary which she used to travel to Paris to study with Gustave Courtois at the Académie Colarossi. Courtois shared a studio with Pascal Dagnan-Bouveret and Dean may have been influenced by his paintings of women in traditional costumes.

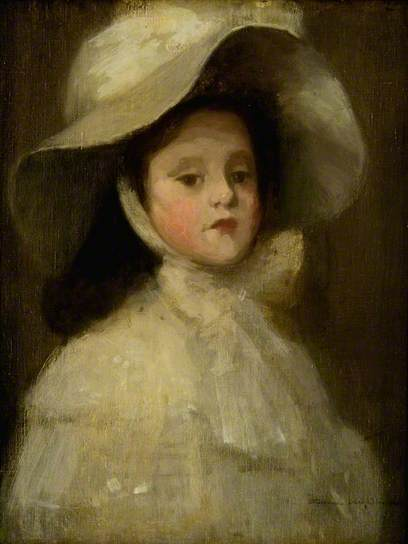
Dean's portrait of Jean Macaulay Stevenson, her step-daughter

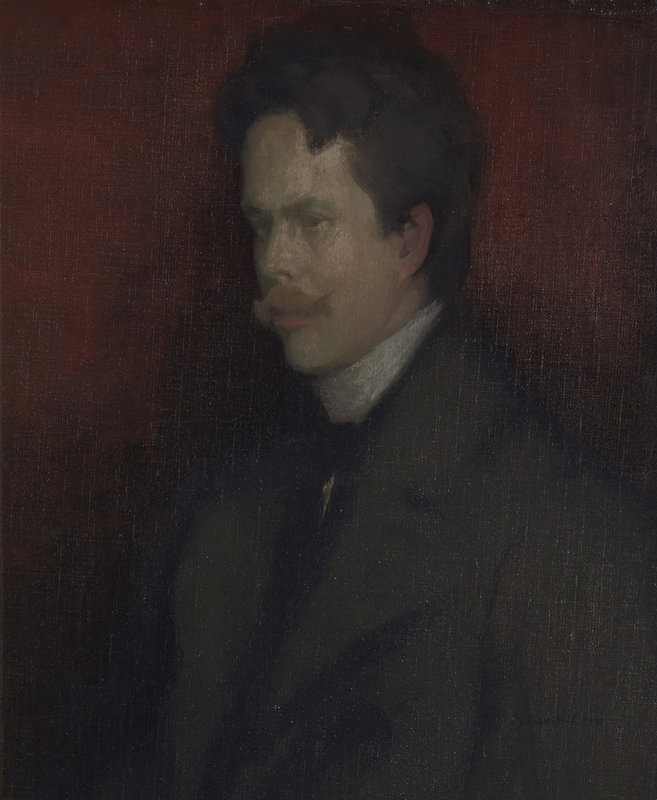
Dean's portrait of Neil Munro

Stevenson first exhibited her work in 1894 at the Glasgow Institute and exhibited there regularly until 1910. She also exhibited in Paisley, the Walker Art Gallery in Liverpool, at the Royal Scottish Academy and twice at the International Society in London. Her early work may have been influenced by the Society's president James McNeill Whistler. In 1899, her painting Pensive was accepted at the salon of the Société Nationale des Beaux-Arts in Paris. When exhibiting she was sometimes mistakenly thought to be a man due to her given name Stansmore.

On returning from studying in Paris Stevenson opened a studio in 1894 at West Regent Street, Glasgow. She regularly spent the summer months in France and the Netherlands and while in the artists' colony at Volendam she created oil sketches, drawings and portraits of men and women in traditional costumes. Her 1895 painting Byway, Old Holland shows the distinctive Dutch kraplap chemise and peaked lace hat.

On 30 April 1902 Dean married the artist Robert Macaulay Stevenson and was step-mother to his daughter Jean. They lived at Stevenson's house, Robinsfield, near Bardowie Loch at Milngavie. The artists each had studios at Robinsfield.

In 1905 she painted a portrait of the Scottish author Neil Munro which is now at the Scottish National Portrait Gallery in Edinburgh.

Dean was a member of the Glasgow Society of Lady Artists' Club. She was elected to supervise the alterations to the Club's premises on Blythswood Square and she selected Charles Rennie Mackintosh as the designer. The Club's President and Council disagreed with Dean's choice of Mackintosh and as a result she resigned her position in protest.

In 1910 Dean and Stevenson moved to Montreuil-sur-Mer in France where they stayed until 1926. During World War I they helped the needs of soldiers as they passed through the town on their way to the front.

In 1932 she and her husband moved to Kirkcudbrightshire where she made use of the Greengate studios of the artist Jessie M. King. By then Dean's eyesight was beginning to fail and she painted less often.

Dean died at Castle Douglas, Kirkcudbrightshire on 15 December 1944.
