= William Somerville Shanks =

Scottish artist (1864–1951)

- Self portrait of William Somerville Shanks (c.1910)
- Born: 28 September 1864; Gourock, Scotland
- Died: 28 July 1951 (aged 86); Glasgow, Scotland

William Somerville Shanks ARSA, RSA, RSW (28 September 1864 – 28 July 1951) was a Scottish artist who was a tutor in painting and drawing at the Glasgow School of Art for 29 years. His painting Tiddley Winks sold for £181,250 at Sotheby's in 2008, a record for the artist.

William Somerville Shanks was born in Gourock in Renfrewshire in 1864 to Helen and John Shanks (1923-1913), a horse proprietor who worked as a clothier and tailor in his native town of Paisley where generations of his family had been weavers. According to the 1871 census they were living at 1, George Place in Gourock with their four children: Mary, William, Agnes and Archibald. The 1881 census reveals that by then the family were living in Glasgow where William Somerville Shanks was working as a pattern designer for a curtain manufacturer. However, William Shanks had ambitions to be an artist, and after attended evening classes at the Glasgow School of Art under Francis Henry Newbery he made painting his career, in 1889 travelling to Paris to improve his skills, studying for three years at the Académie Julian under Jean-Paul Laurens and Benjamin Constant. In Paris Shanks became influenced by the paintings of Édouard Manet. His painting Tiddley Winks was exhibited at the Royal Glasgow Institute of the Fine Arts in 1897 and at one time was owned by Eliot Hodgkin who sold it to art dealer Charlotte Frank, the aunt of Anne Frank; Sir David Montagu Douglas Scott obtained it from her in 1962 for £60. On loan to the Fitzwilliam Museum in Cambridge from 2007 to 2008, it sold at Sotheby's in 2008 for £181,250, a record for the artist. Shanks was to become a regular exhibitor at the Royal Glasgow Institute of the Fine Arts and the Royal Scottish Academy.

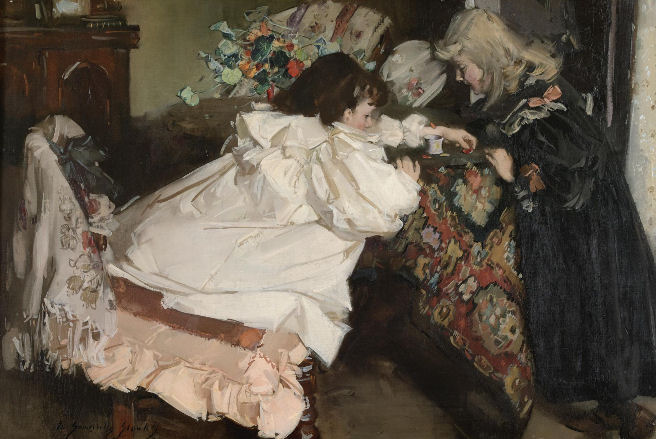
'Tiddley Winks' (1897) - Shanks' most important work

Later Shanks was to return to the Glasgow School of Art (GSA) as a tutor of painting and drawing, remaining there for the next 29 years. A painter in oil and watercolours of portraits, interiors and still life but who preferred to work in oils, at the GSA Shanks was Assistant Professor (Drawing and Painting) Antique and preparatory life 1910 to 1911; Assistant Professor (Drawing and Painting) Life, head life, portrait and costume model, painting, antique and still life 1913 to 1914 and 1924 to 1925; Lecturer (Drawing and Painting) Drawing, painting and composition 1925 to 1926 and 1929 to 1930; Drawing and Painting (School of Design, Pictorial and Commercial Art) 1930 to 1931; Drawing and Painting (Drawing and Painting) 1934 to 1935. In 1922 he received a silver medal at the Société des Artistes Français.

Although not a member of the Glasgow Boys Shanks was clearly influenced by their work and would have known Edward Atkinson Hornel and George Henry. Shanks was elected an Associate (ARSA) of the Royal Scottish Academy in 1923 and elected Member of the RSA in 1933.

Shanks lived at 8 Parkgrove Terrace in Glasgow. A self portrait (see above) is held in the Collection of National Galleries of Scotland.
