= Percy William Gibbs =

British painter

- Born: 3 June 1873; Poplar
- Died: 1955 (aged 81–82)
- Alma mater: Royal Academy Schools
- Occupation: Painter

Percy William Gibbs (1873–1955) was a British painter.

He was born in 1873 in Poplar, east London, and trained at the Royal Academy Schools from 1892 to 1897, where he won the 1894-1895 Creswick Prize for landscape painting. He subsequently exhibited at the RA, Glasgow Institute of Fine Art and at the Walker Art Gallery.

He had a home at East Molesey, Surrey.

He died in 1955.

He signed some of his works 'P.W. Gibbs'. His oil painting Landing the Catch in the Museums Sheffield collection.

In June 2019 his painting of a young woman in a silk kimono was shown on an episode of the BBC Television programme Antiques Roadshow. It was described as "an incredibly sophistcated painting".
