= Robert Macaulay Stevenson =

Scottish painter (1854–1952)

- Born: 4 June 1854; Glasgow, Scotland
- Died: 20 September 1952 (aged 98); Glasgow, Scotland

Robert Macaulay Stevenson (4 June 1854 – 20 September 1952) was a Scottish painter associated with the Glasgow Boys.

== Biography ==
Robert Macaulay Stevenson was born in Glasgow in 1854. He was one of four sons and three girls born to Jessie Macaulay and John Stevenson, an engineer. His brother Sir Daniel Macaulay Stevenson was a Liberal politician, Lord Provost of Glasgow and Chancellor of the University of Glasgow.

Stevenson initially studied engineering however later changed to study art at the Glasgow School of Design. He was influenced by the French style of painting in particular the work of the Barbizon school and especially by the French portrait and landscape painter Jean-Baptiste-Camille Corot.

In 1881 he exhibited at the gallery of Kay & Reid in Glasgow.

He worked from studios in Glasgow, at Montreuil-sur-Mer in France, at Kirkcudbright, and at Bardowie Loch, near Milngavie.

In 1890 Stevenson married Jean Shields. She died giving birth to their daughter Jean Macaulay Stevenson. On 30 April 1902 Stevenson married the Scottish artist Stansmore Dean.

Stevenson died in 1952.

== Awards ==
- Gold medal at the first Munich Secession exhibition, 1893.
- Diploma of honour at the second General Exposition of Fine Arts (Exposición General de Bellas Artes) in Barcelona, 1894.
- Silver medal at Brussels International Exposition, 1897.
