= Helen Paxton Brown =

Scottish artist (1876–1956)

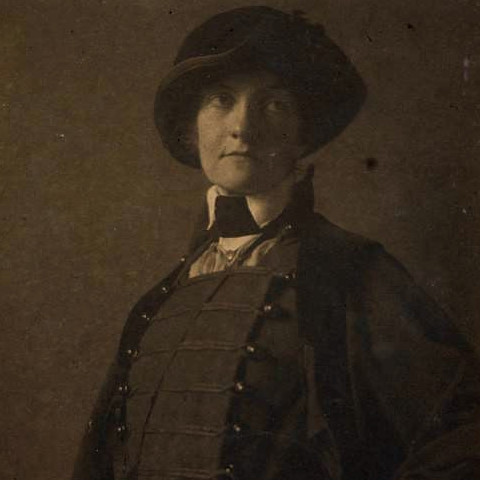
- Born: 1876; Glasgow, Scotland
- Died: 20 March 1956 (aged 79–80); Glasgow, Scotland
- Education: Glasgow School of Art
- Known for: Embroidery, bookbinding
- Movement: Arts and Crafts

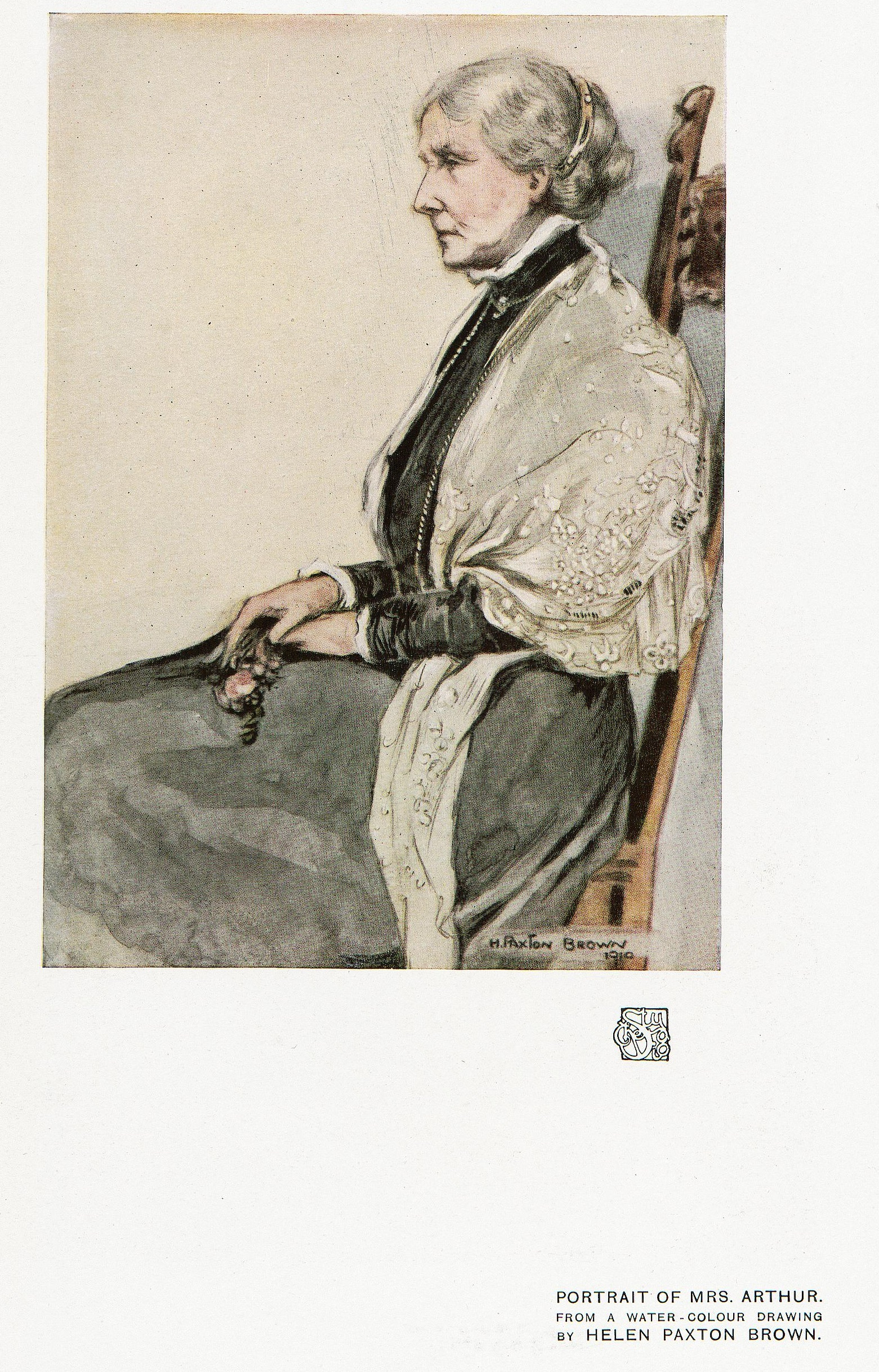
Portrait of Mrs Arthur by Helen Paxton Brown studio1915a 0207 (1)

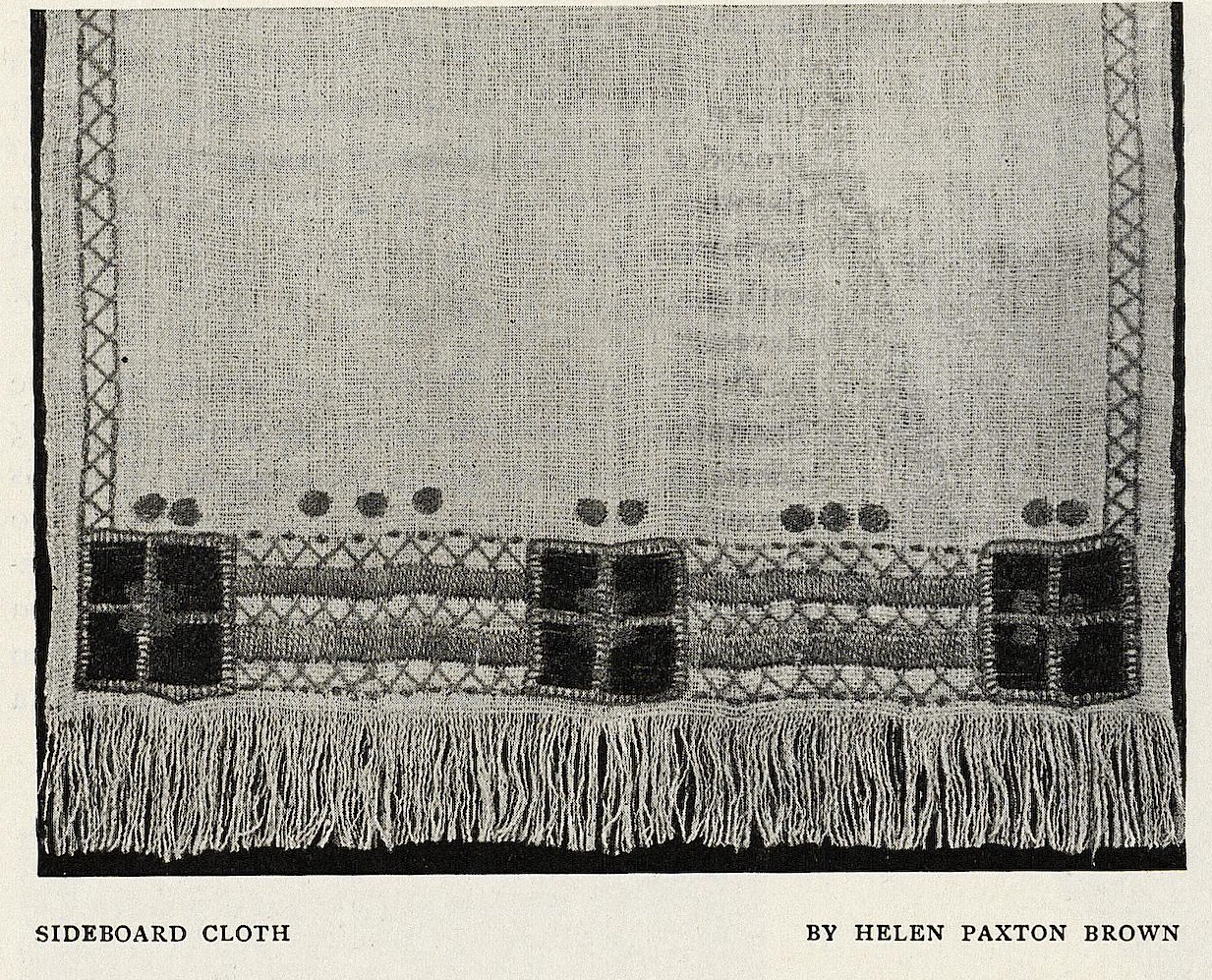
Sideboard Cloth by Helen Paxton Brown studio1910b 0152

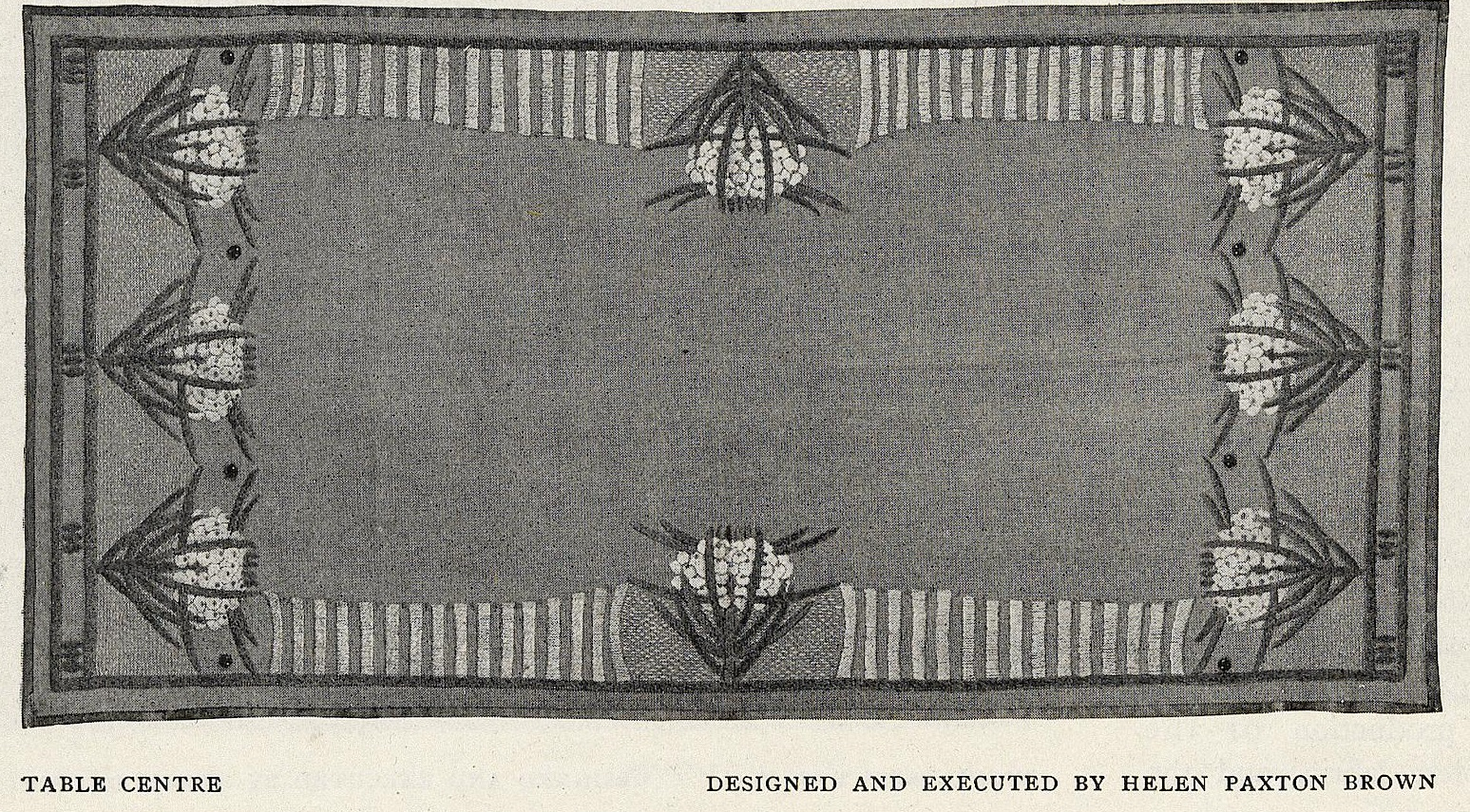
Table Centre by Helen Paxton Brown studio1910b 0157

Helen Paxton Brown (1876 – 20 March 1956) also known as "Nell", was an artist associated with the Glasgow Girls. Born in Hillhead, Glasgow to a Scottish father and English mother and she spent most of her life in Glasgow. Best known for her painting and embroidering she also worked in a range of mediums such as leather, book binding and also painted china.

== Education and career ==
Brown studied at Glasgow School of Art (GSA) from 1894 to 1901 under directorship of the progressive Fra. H Newbery. She was a student of Ann Macbeth at GSA and then went on to teach art embroidery to teachers at GSA from 1904 to 1907 (embroidery being an important part of GSA craft at that time) and then book binding from 1911 to 1913. It was whilst studying at GSA that she met her good friend Jessie M. King who she shared a studio flat with at 101 St Vincent Street, Glasgow from around 1898 until 1907 when King got married. The women's friendship was longlasting and strong despite the different trajectories of their careers. King attracted international acclaim but despite some early notice Brown had less success. The two women often modelled for each other and were inseparable companions during the years they lived together.

After GSA Brown went to Paris to attend sketching classes and was an admirer of the free style of French Impressionists and would continue to visit Paris throughout her career. Her work mainly captures people out enjoying life, capturing atmosphere and café scenes (reflecting her interest in fashion and clothes), but she also painted landscapes and flowers too.

She is quoted as saying that she chose embroidery because she enjoyed "playing with colour" but also because it would sell as "art for art's sake is the road to starvation nowadays". She was reportedly vivacious and noted for her witty wisecracks

In the 1900s Patrick Geddes and Fra Newberry led a number of Scottish masques and pageants relating to Pan-Celtic events involving a range of Arts and Crafts designers from Edinburgh and Glasgow. Helen Paxton Brown was involved in the "historical" pageant production at the University of Glasgow.

== Exhibitions and commissions ==
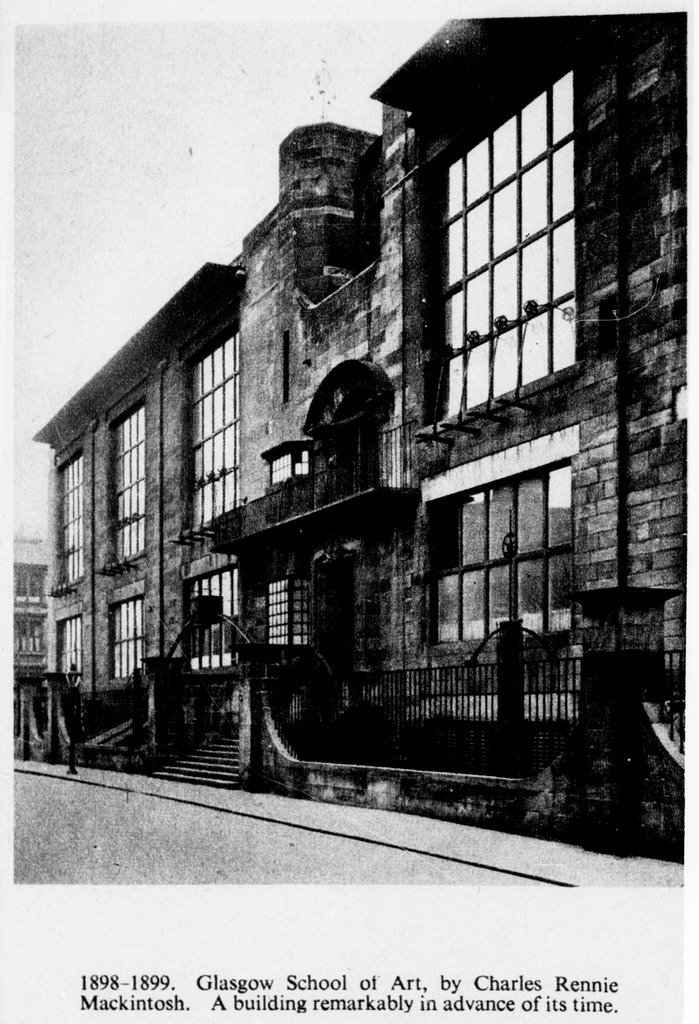
Glasgow School of Art

Brown joined "The Glasgow Society of Artists" (started by physician Alexander Frew, husband of painter Bessie MacNicol) which women could join unlike the all-male Glasgow Art Club. Although short-lived, the society provided an alternative for those painters dissatisfied with the Glasgow establishment. She was also a member of the Glasgow Society of Lady Artists from 1905 and became an honorary member in 1948 where her work could often be found as well as at the Glasgow Art Institute.

From 1920s Brown started using more bright colours and bolder designs in both her painting and embroidery. This development was shown in a joint exhibition with Jessie M. King at the Glasgow Society of Lady Artists’ exhibition in April 1931 called "Spring in Three Room" which not only showed their paintings but saw them taking over three rooms which were decorated in bright yellows and creams showing different home decoration, in stark contrast to the then contemporary style of dark furniture. Jessie M. King and Paxton Brown exhibited their work on several occasions together.

In 1925 she received a commission from Mount Blow, Dalmuir to paint 12 mural panels of nursery rhymes, through the Glasgow Corporation Welfare Scheme.

Examples of her work can now be seen in the Kelvingrove Art Gallery and Museum in Glasgow.
