= Jessie Alexandra Dick =

Scottish artist and teacher (1896-1976)

- Self Portrait in the Studio
- Born: 13 July 1896; Largs, Scotland
- Died: 16 August 1976 (aged 80); Clarkston, Scotland
- Education: Glasgow School of Art
- Known for: Painting and teaching

Jessie Alexandra Dick, known as J Alix Dick, (13 July 1896 – 16 August 1976) was a Scottish artist and teacher. She was known as a painter of portraits and still-life pieces in both oils and watercolours.

== Biography ==
Dick was the youngest daughter in a family of eleven children. She was born in Largs where her father was the head gardener on the estate of Lord Kelvin. She studied at the Glasgow School of Art from 1915 to 1919 and joined the teaching staff of the School in 1921. Holding a variety of posts, but mainly teaching painting and drawing, she remained on the staff of the School until her retirement in 1959. She was an active member of the Glasgow Society of Lady Artists and, in 1960, was elected an associate member of the Royal Scottish Academy. She was also a regular exhibitor with the Royal Watercolour Society, with the Royal Society of Painter-Etchers and Engravers and at the Royal Glasgow Institute of the Fine Arts. Dick died in 1976 after a fall at the home in Clarkston she shared with one of her sisters. For many years a large portrait of her, Self Portrait in the Studio, hung in the Glasgow School of Art but was destroyed in 2014 when fire engulfed the building. After her death, several fine watercolours by Dick were saved by a neighbour when about to be thrown away. The McLean Museum and Art Gallery in Greenock holds examples of her work.

== Glasgow School of Art ==
From 1922 until her retirement in 1959, Alix Dick taught at the GSA in various roles:

- 1922/23–1924/25: Assistant Professor (Drawing & Painting Dept) Landscape and figure composition, mural & decorative painting, portrait and costume model, painting antique and still life
- 1925/26–1929/30: Lecturer (Drawing & Painting Dept) Drawing, painting, composition
- 1930/31–1931/32: Drawing & Painting (School of Design) pictorial and commercial art
- 1932/33: Drawing & Painting (Lower School, general course) drawing, painting, composition
- 1933/34: Drawing & Painting (Lower School, general course) Still life painting, oil & watercolour
- 1934/35–1937/38: Drawing & Painting, still life painting, oil & watercolour
- 1938/39–1959/60: Drawing & Painting lecturer (Drawing & Painting Dept)
