= Eleanor Allen Moore =

Scottish-Irish painter (1885–1955)

- Detail from self_portrait
- Born: 26 July 1885; Glenfield, Glenwherry, County Antrim
- Died: 17 September 1955 (aged 70); Edinburgh
- Education: Glasgow School of Art
- Occupation: Artist

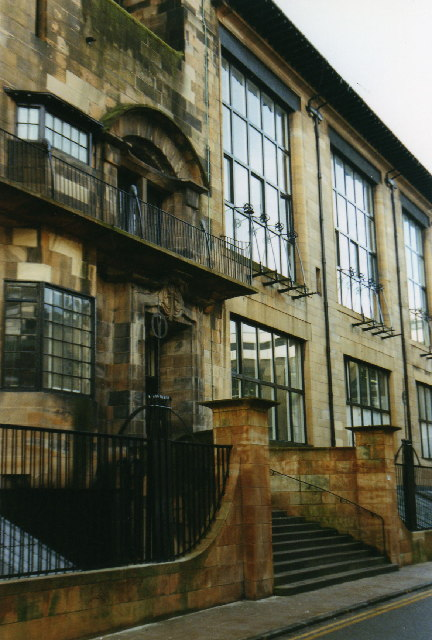
Glasgow School of Art, where Moore studied drawing and painting

Eleanor Allen Moore (26 July 1885 – 17 September 1955) was a British painter who was born in Northern Ireland, but became one of the group of painters known as the "Glasgow Girls".

== Early life and education ==
Moore was born in Glenfield, Glenwherry, County Antrim in 1885. In 1888 she moved with her family to Ayrshire, Scotland, where her father worked as a minister at Loudoun Old Parish Church. She attended Kilmarnock Academy. From 1902 to 1907 she studied drawing and painting at the Glasgow School of Art, where she was a contemporary of Norah Neilson Gray.

== World War I and later ==
During World War I Moore served as a Voluntary Aid Detachment nurse at Craigleith Hospital in Edinburgh. In 1922, Moore married Dr Robert Cecil Robertson and she gave birth to their daughter, Ailsa, the following year. In 1925, the family moved to Shanghai, China, where Robertson was appointed with the Shanghai Municipal Council. Moore continued to paint in Shanghai, where she was inspired by the street scenes and by the Yangtze River Delta. Moore and her daughter were evacuated from Shanghai to Hong Kong during the Sino-Japanese War in 1937, and returned to Scotland soon after, though she had stopped painting. Her husband, Dr Robertson, remained in Hong Kong until his death in 1942.

== Death and legacy ==
Moore died in a hospital in Edinburgh in 1955. Moore and her husband were the subject of an exhibition in 1997 which was held at the Dick Institute, Kilmarnock, which holds several of her works including a large three quarter length self-portrait. Moore was included in the Glasgow Girls exhibition in Kirkcudbright in 2010 and a book on the Glasgow Girls by Alisa Tanner, Tanner is Moore's daughter.
