= William Kennedy (painter) =

Scottish painter (1859–1918)

- Born: 17 July 1859; Glasgow, Scotland
- Died: 11 December 1918 (aged 59); Tangier, Morocco

William Kennedy (17 July 1859 – 11 December 1918) was a Scottish painter associated with the Glasgow School.

== Biography ==
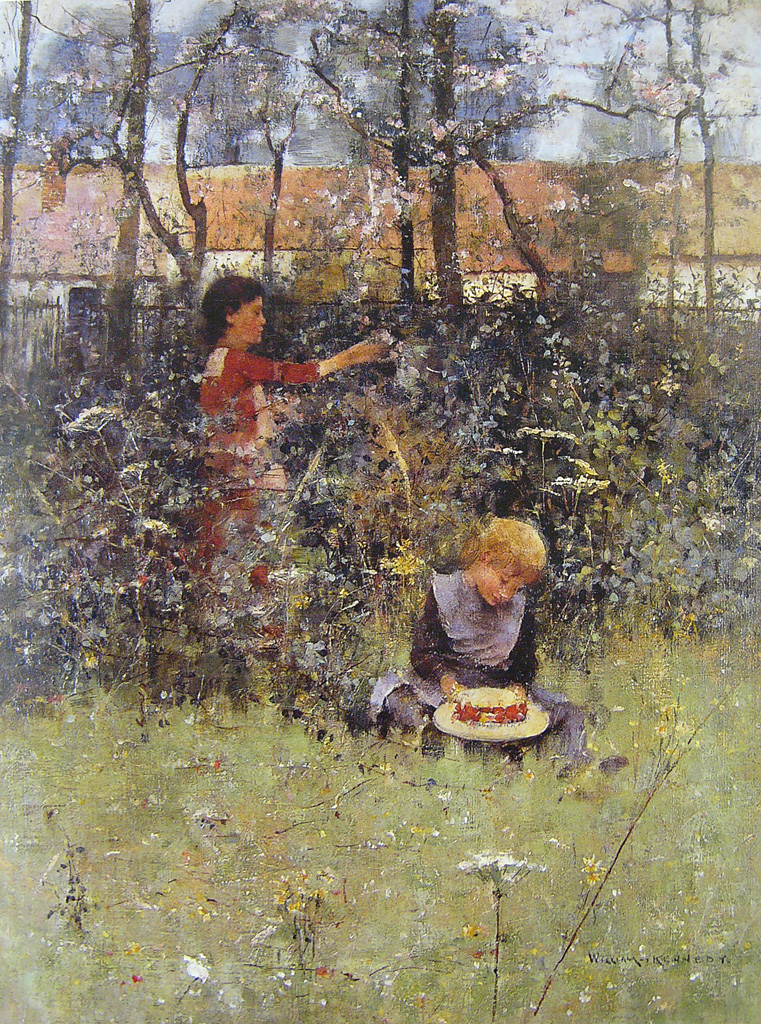
Spring, 1882

William Kennedy was born in Hutchesontown, Glasgow on 17 July 1859, and attended the Paisley School of Art. In the early 1880s he moved to Paris, where he attended the Académie Julian and studied with artists such as Jules Bastien-Lepage, William-Adolphe Bouguereau, Raphaël Collin, Gustave-Claude-Etienne Courtois, and Tony Robert-Fleury.

He established a studio in Stirling and painted rural landscapes, as well as boldly-colored depictions of Highland soldiers at Stirling Castle.

Kennedy became a prominent member of a group of artists known as the Glasgow Boys. In 1887 he was elected president of a society formed by the group's members.

He moved to Berkshire in the 1890s, and married fellow painter Lena Scott in 1898. He moved to Tangier in 1912, for health reasons. While living there, his art featured scenes from Moorish life.

Kennedy's wife Lena died in October 1918, and he died in Tangier in December.
