= Anna Dixon (artist) =

Scottish artist (1873–1959)

- Born: 1873; Scotland
- Died: 6 February 1959 (aged 85–86)
- Education: Royal Scottish Academy

Anna Dixon (born 1873 – 6 February 1959) was an artist from Edinburgh. She was known for her paintings, mostly watercolours and oil paintings which feature Western Scottish villages and crofts, birds, flowers, animals, and children with horses or donkeys.

== Biography ==
Dixon was born in Edinburgh, Scotland in 1873. She lived in Edinburgh for her whole life and died in 1959.

== Education ==
Dixon studied at the Royal Scottish Academy. At Royal Scottish Academy Life School, Dixon studied under E A Walton, Charles Mackie and William Walls.

== Career ==
Dixon's work often featured images of Scottish landscapes, flowers, and children.

Dixon exhibited her work across a period of 64 years. She produced many paintings, which were exhibited across Scotland and the rest of the United Kingdom, including:

- The Royal Academy (94 works between 1894 and 1958)
- The Royal Glasgow Institute of the Fine Arts (107 works between 1904 and 1958)
- The Royal Scottish Academy
- Aberdeen Artists Society (1898-1935)
- Walker Art Gallery
- Royal Society of Women Artists

Dixon successfully sold her work during her life and posthumously. In 1991 her painting Donkey Carts (oil on canvas) sold for £2,640. In 1994 her work Summer Days (1893, oil on canvas) sold for £1,610, and Donkeys on Portobello Beach (1905, oil on canvas) sold for £4,600. In 1996 the painting Ducks by a River (watercolour) sold for £1,207. In 2002 Potter's Wheel (1904, oil on canvas) sold for £2,000.
