= Annie French =

Scottish artist (1872–1965)

- Born: 6 February 1872; Govan, United Kingdom
- Died: 27 January 1965 (aged 92); Saint Helier, Jersey
- Known for: Painting, Illustration, Design
- Movement: Art Nouveau
- Spouse: George Woolliscroft Rhead (m. 1914–1920)

Annie French (6 February 1872 – 27 January 1965) was a Scottish painter, engraver, illustrator, and designer associated with the Glasgow School.

== Biography ==
French was a student of Jean Delville and Fra Newbery at the Glasgow School of Art from 1896 to 1902. She shared a studio with artist Bessie Young and fellow Glasgow School painter Jane Younger from 1906 to 1914. She returned to the Glasgow School to teach ceramic decoration from 1909 to 1912. She published books of black and white illustration in the style of Beardsley. The Picture Book and The Plumed Hat were republished in elite art publications in 1906 and 1900 respectively. French was married to painter, engraver, and illustrator George Woolliscroft Rhead from 1914 until his death in 1920. She died at St Helier on the island of Jersey on 25 January 1965.

== Art ==
As a member of a group of designers and artists known as the Glasgow Girls, French was best known for black-and-white illustrations in the Art Nouveau style. Her influences included Aubrey Beardsley, Jessie M. King, and Charles Rennie Mackintosh.

French's work was exhibited at the Royal Academy and published in The Studio.

== Gallery ==
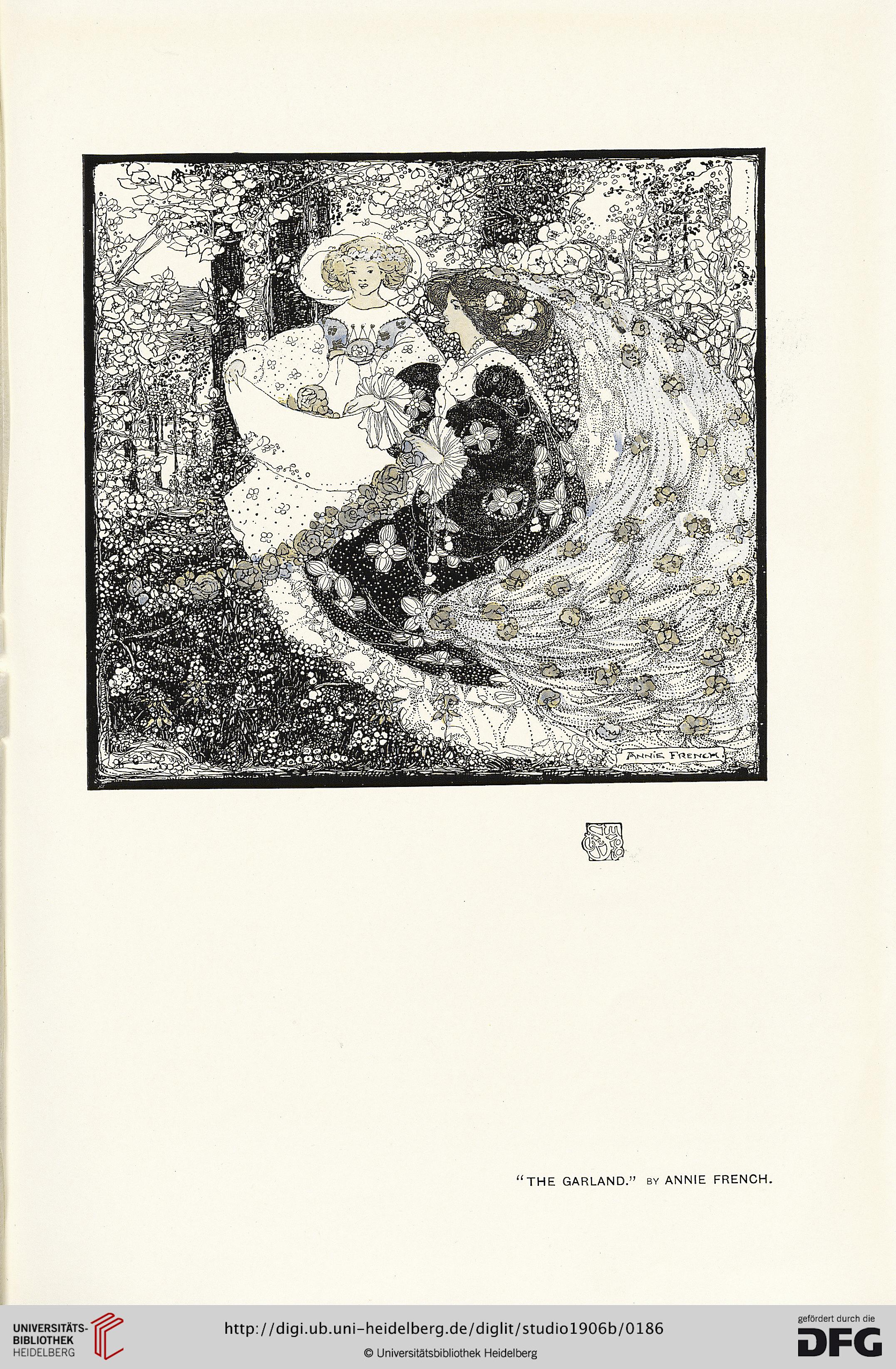
"The Garland", published in The Studio vol 38, 1906

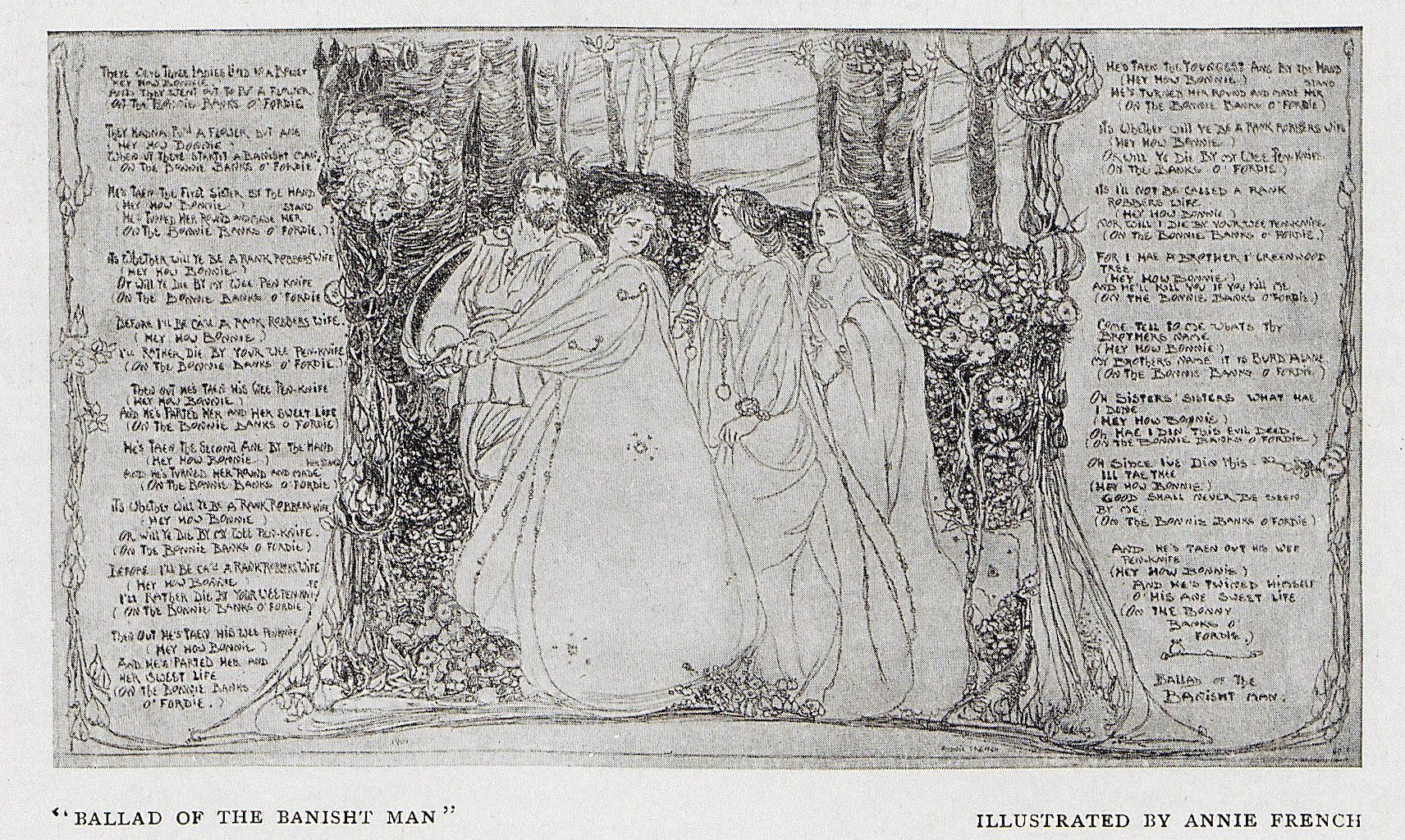
Illustration for "The Ballad of the Banish’t Man", displayed at 1902 exhibition of the Glasgow School of Art, and published in The Studio.

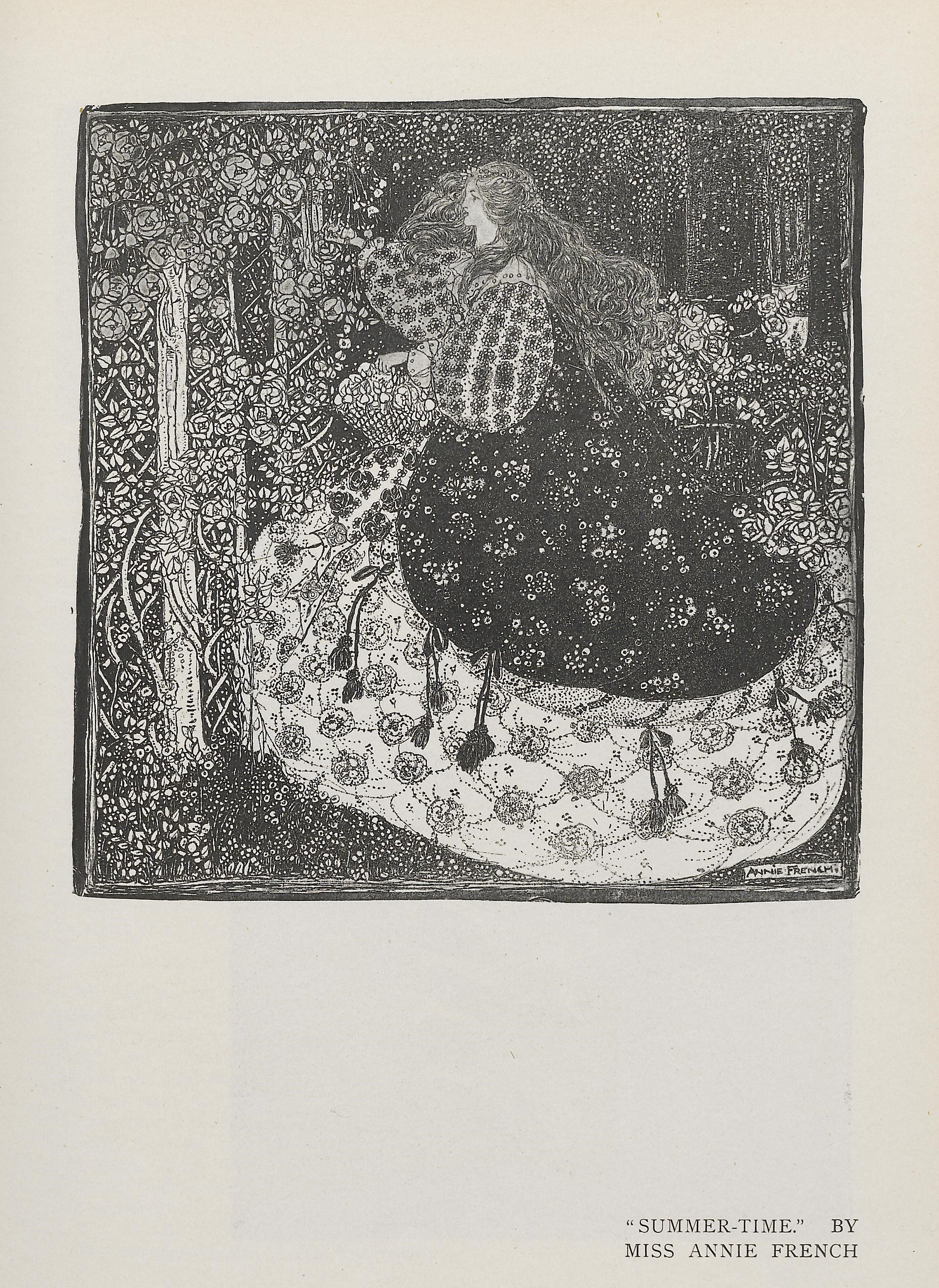
Illustration of “Summer Time” from The Studio
