= Kraplap =

Traditional Dutch shoulder garment

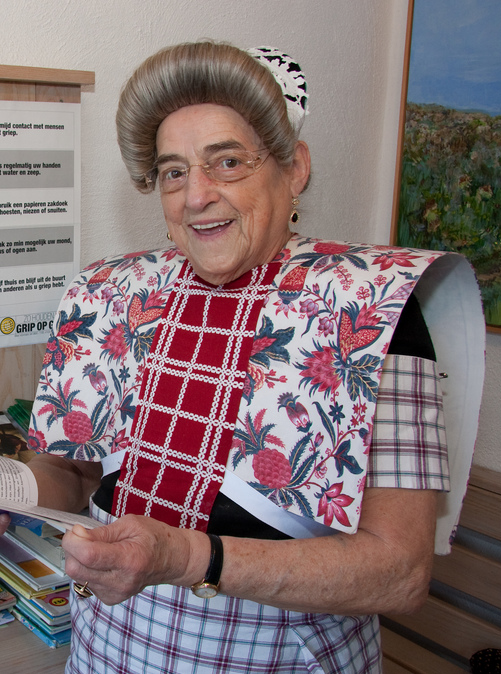
A woman in the Dutch town of Spakenburg wearing an embroidered kraplap over her shoulders

A kraplap is a traditional Dutch breastcloth garment made of stiff, starched cotton which was once worn by women throughout the Netherlands but which has all but disappeared by the early 21st century.
