= Allan D. Mainds =

Allan Douglas Mainds, RSA (23 January 1881 – 4 July 1945) was a Scottish painter and designer.

== Early life ==
Mainds was born in Helensburgh in 1881. His mother was Catherine Thompson Gilfillan, his father was the artist W. R. Mainds, who made watercolour sketches of the buildings of Glasgow during the late nineteenth century. Allan D. Mainds trained at the Glasgow School of Art, and during his time there he won the Haldane Travelling Scholarship, which supported a period abroad studying in Brussels under the supervision of Jean Delville. He went on to Paris, Venice and a six-week visit to Rome where he studied the frescoes of Michelangelo and Raphael in the Vatican.

== Career ==
Mainds focused on portrait painting, in addition to watercolours of landscapes and still life subjects; his portraiture subjects included Robert Bolam. Mainds also worked as a designer of costumes and posters, in addition to theatre design. He was a member of staff at the Glasgow School of Art from 1909 to 1931, teaching ornament, life drawing and painting. From 1910 to 1918 he lectured in the history of costume and armour. He became a member of the Royal Scottish Academy in 1929. In 1931 he became professor of fine Art and Director of the King Edward VII School of Art, Kings College, University of Durham.

== Military service ==
Mainds served in the First World War with the Royal Field Artillery, reaching the rank of captain. He sketched landscape for the artillery and later on taught in a convalescent hospital. In 1916 he married Mary Hogg, who had been a student at the Glasgow School of Art. he is included in the Glasgow School of Art's First World War Roll of Honour.

== Later life ==
In 1931, Mainds became Professor of Fine Art at Armstrong College, which was then part of the Newcastle division of Durham University. He died on 4 July 1945 at 34 Elmfield Road, Gosforth.

Photographs by Allan Mainds are held at the Conway Library in the Courtauld, London, and are being digitised.
