= George Henry (painter) =

Scottish painter (1858–1943)

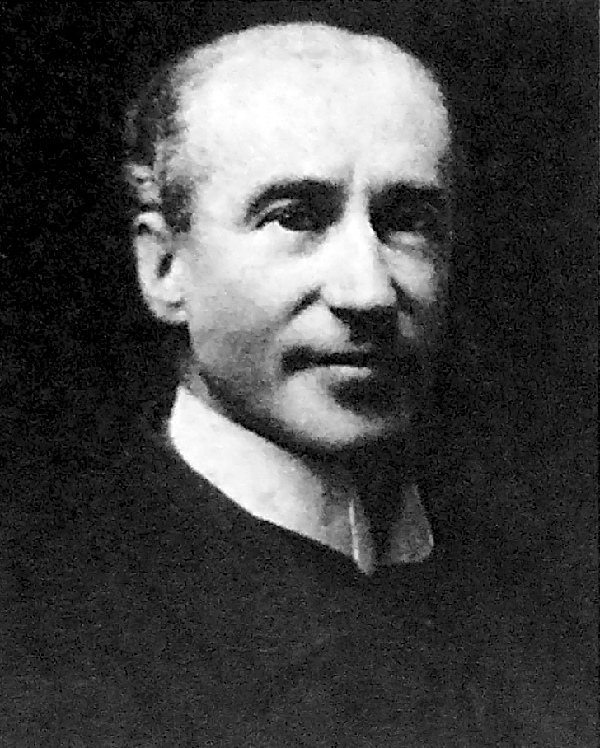
- Born: 14 March 1858; Irvine, Scotland
- Died: 23 December 1943 (aged 85); London, England

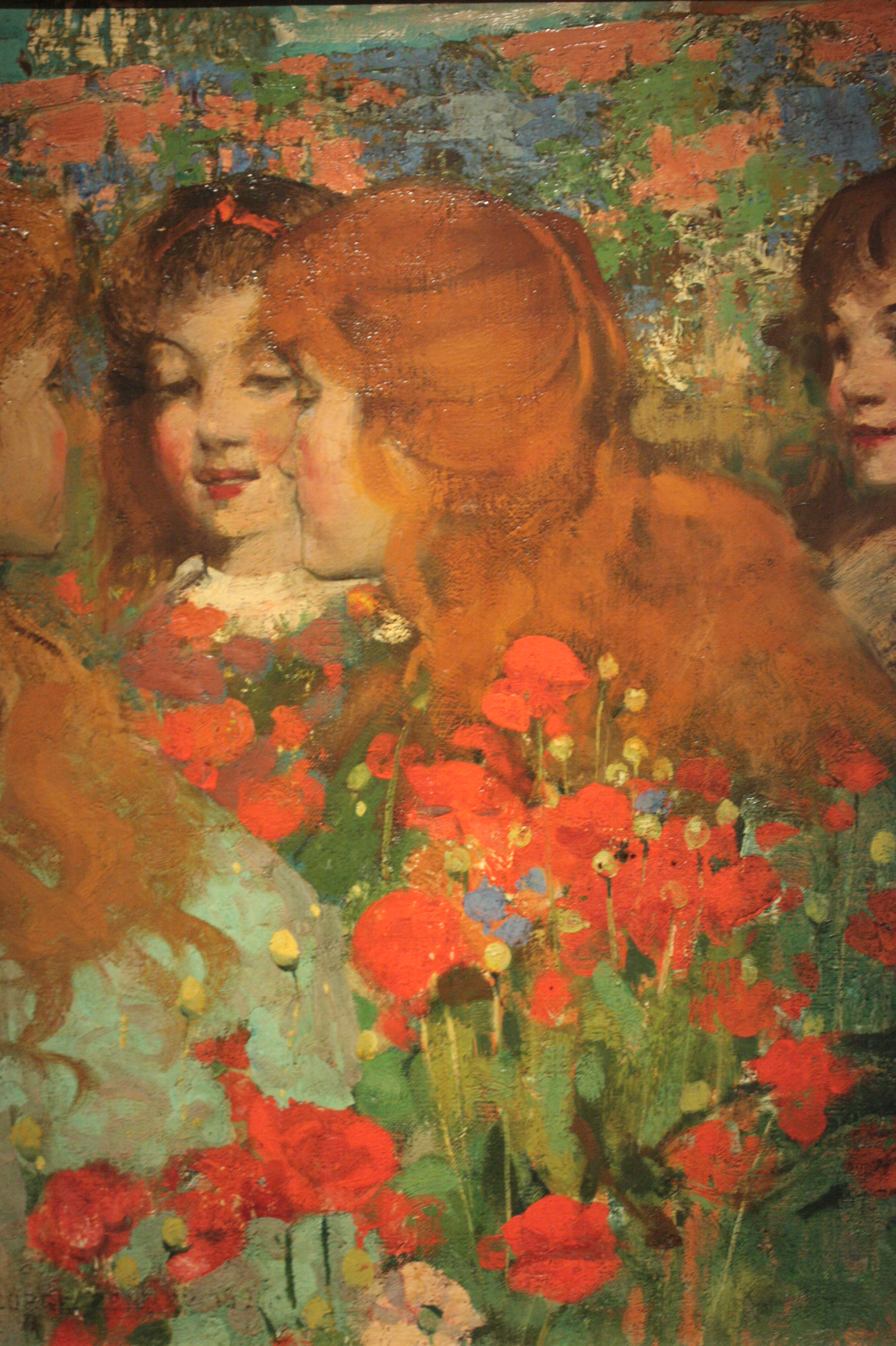
Poppies by George Henry, 1891

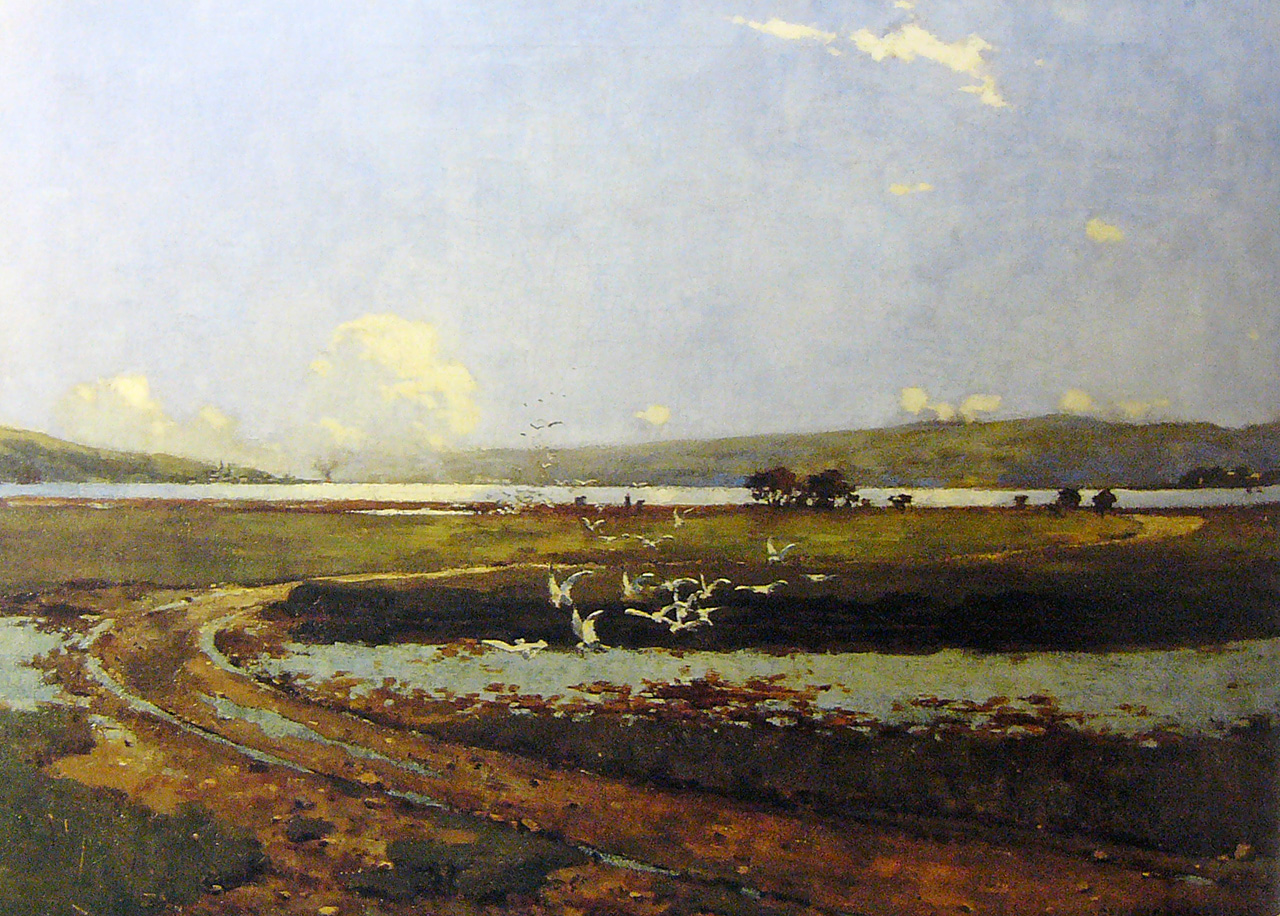
The head of the Holy Loch

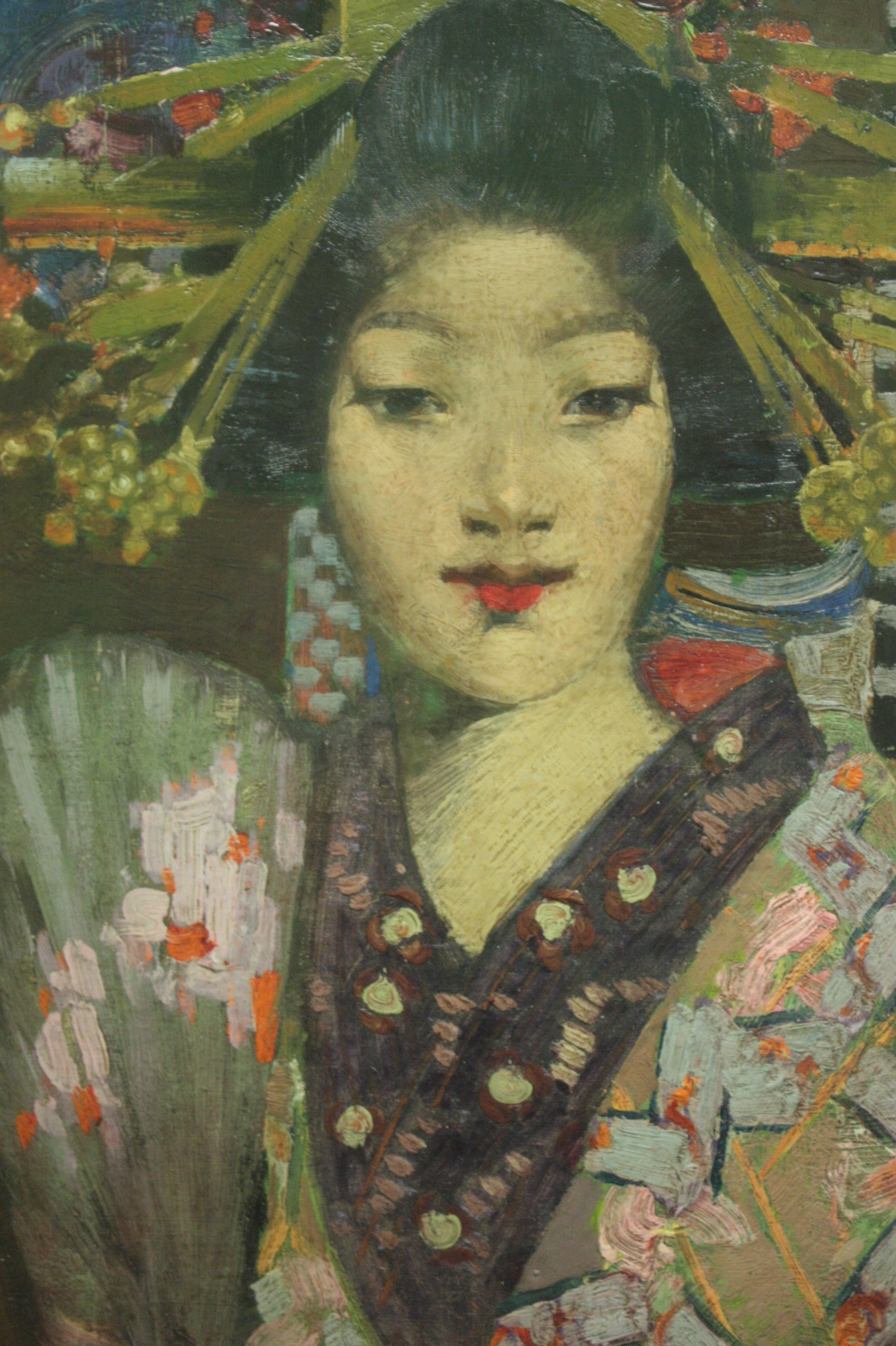
Geisha Girl by George Henry (detail) 1894, National Gallery of Scotland

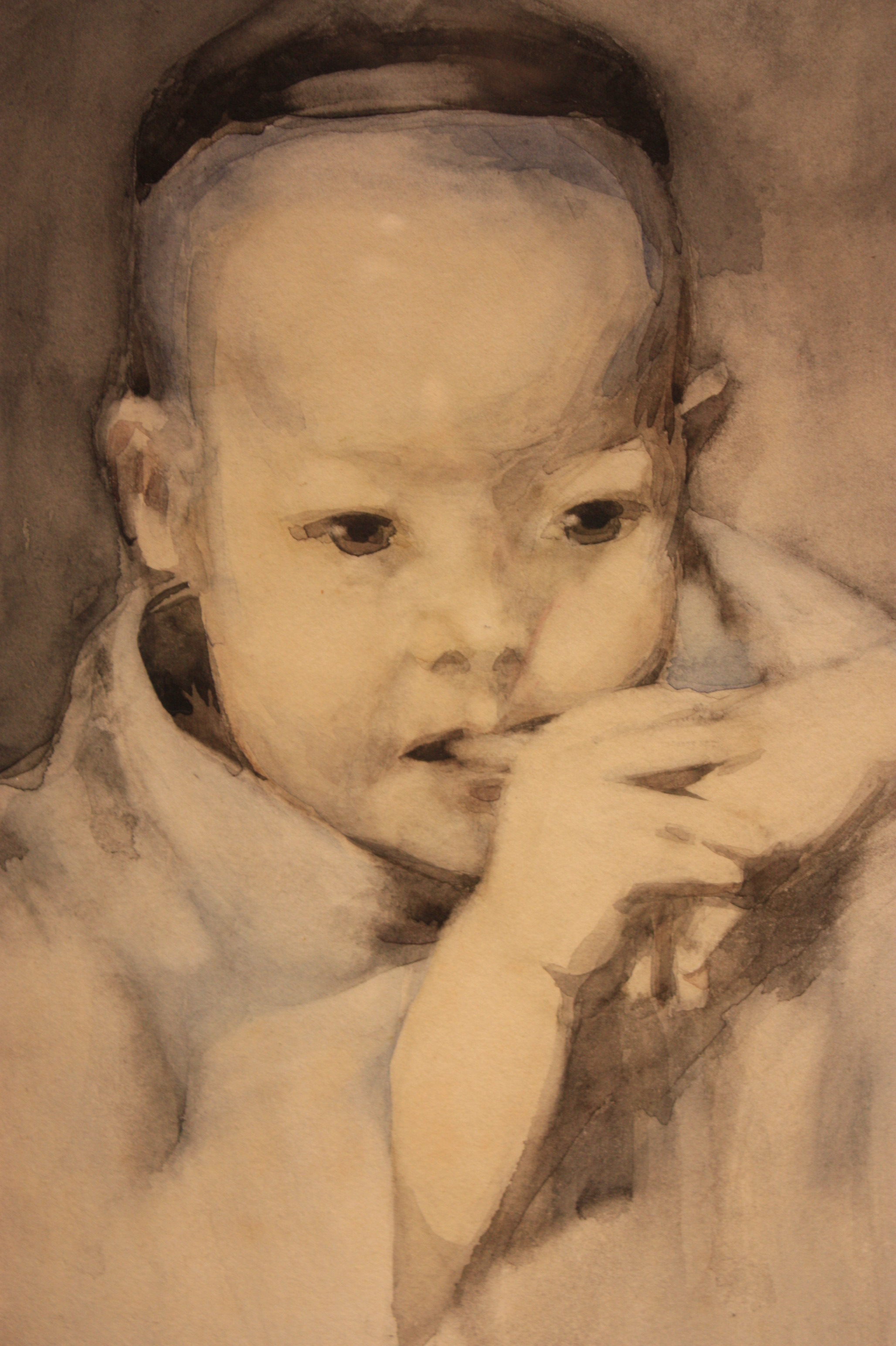
The Japanese Baby by George Henry 1893 (watercolour)

George Henry RA (1858–1943) was a Scottish painter, one of the most prominent of the Glasgow School.

== Life ==
Henry was born in Irvine, North Ayrshire, and studied at the Glasgow School of Art, later in Macgregor's studio, but learned most from his nature studies at Kirkcudbright. His father's name was Hendry and George dropped the "d" from his surname as a young man.

He was influenced also by his collaboration with E. A. Hornel in such works as "The Druids" (1887), Grosvenor Gallery, London. His "Galloway Landscape" was epoch-making at Glasgow by reason of its higher key of colour and essentially decorative character. Following these tendencies, the two friends spent a year and a half in Japan.

Henry's importance consists in his influence in the Glasgow school in the direction of richer and more decorative color. In addition to genre and landscape, he also painted portraits, more distinguished by technical ability than by rendition of character. Henry's pictures in public collections include The Blue Gown, Museum of Cape Town, The Grey Hat, at the Royal Scottish Academy, two portraits at Glasgow, and one at Montreal. He was elected a member of the Royal Scottish Academy (1902) and an associate of the Royal Academy.

The Black Hat, a portrait of an Edwardian woman, was included in Modern Britain, a 2007 exhibition at Melbourne's National Gallery of Victoria.

In 1893 he went to Japan with Edward Atkinson Hornel, another of the Glasgow Boys, for an 18-month study tour. His work thereafter had a strong flavour of Orientalism.

== Publications ==
- Martin, The Glasgow School of Painting (London, 1897)
- Caw, Scottish Painting, Past and Present (Edinburgh, 1908)
- Rough, "'My name is Pistol called...' William Mollison, George Henry and the challenge of theatre portraiture", The British Art Journal. (2014) XV, 2, p. 54-58
