= Edward Atkinson Hornel =

Scottish painter (1864–1933)

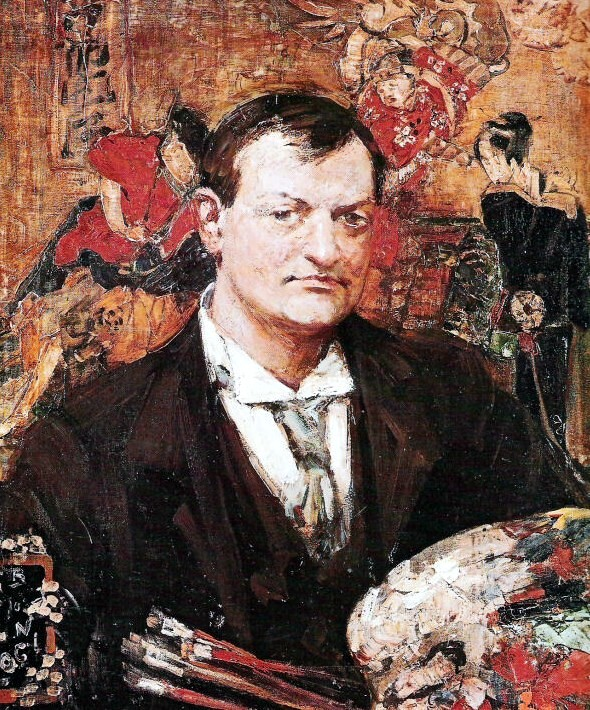
Portrait of E.A. Hornel by Glasgow School contemporary Bessie MacNicol

Edward Atkinson Hornel (17 July 1864 – 30 June 1933) was a Scottish painter of landscapes, flowers, and foliage, with children. He was a cousin of James Hornell. His contemporaries in the Glasgow Boys called him Ned Hornel.

== Biography ==
Hornel was born in Bacchus Marsh, Victoria, Australia, of Scottish parents. He was brought up and lived practically all his life in Scotland after his family moved back to Kirkcudbright in 1866. He studied for three years at the art school at Edinburgh, and for two years in Antwerp under Charles Verlat. Returning from Antwerp in 1885, he met George Henry and associated himself with the Glasgow Boys.

Hornel and Henry collaborated upon The Druids Bringing in the Mistletoe (1890), a procession of druidic priests bringing in the sacred mistletoe, gorgeous with polychrome and gold. The two worked side by side to achieve decorative splendor of colour, Hornel boldly and freely employing texture effects produced by loading and scraping, roughening, smoothing, and staining. In 1893–94 (funded by William Burrell via their friend and art dealer Alexander Reid) the two artists spent a year and a half in Japan, where Hornel learned much about decorative design and spacing. In this period they met the resident British artist, Percy Sturdee.

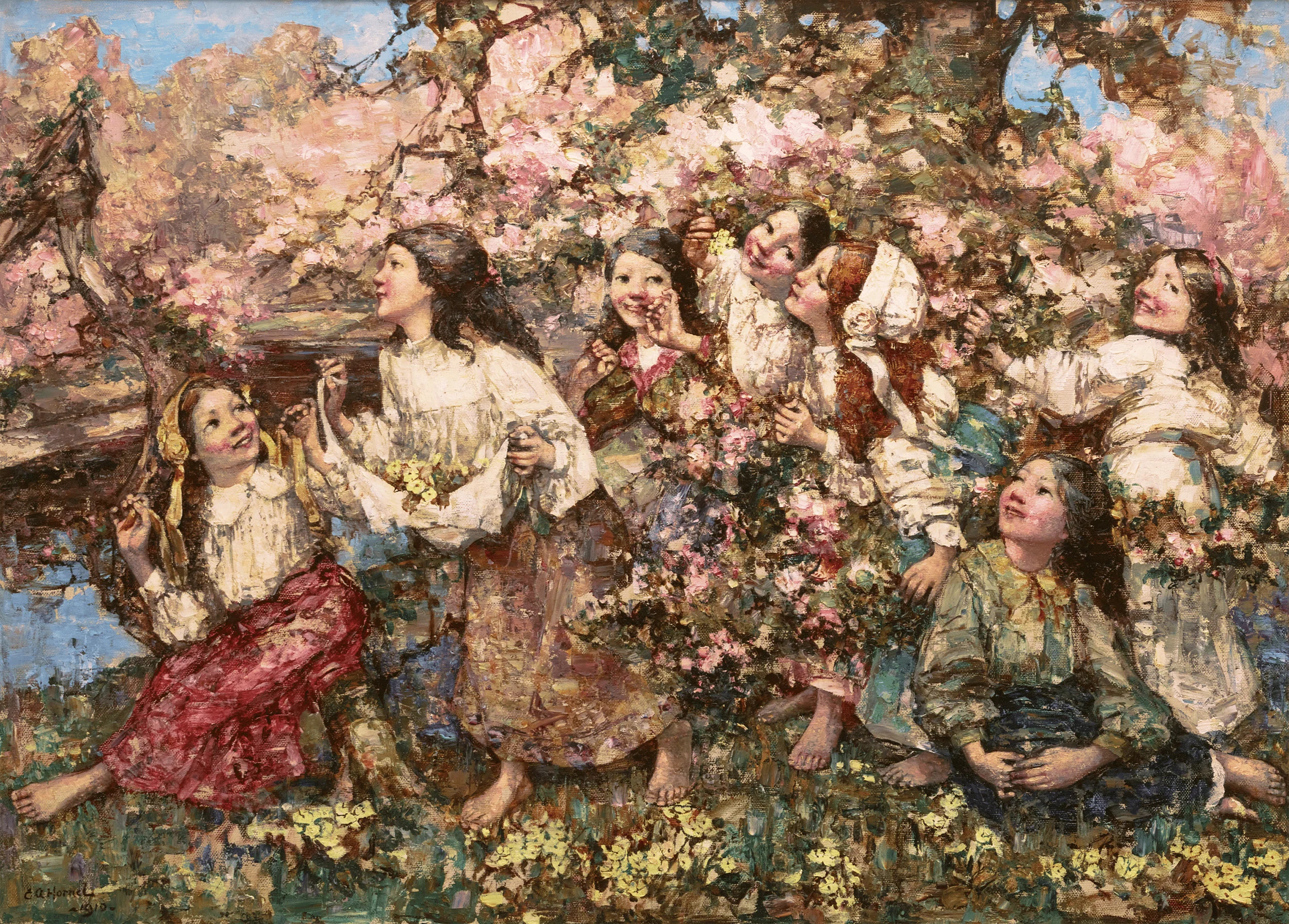
A Spring Roundelay by Edward Atkinson Hornel, 1910

In April 1895 Alexander Reid organised an exhibition of Henry and Hornel's Japanese work which sold very well, especially to Sir John Maxwell Stirling-Maxwell.

In 1895 he contributed the illustration Madame Chrysanthème to the Autumn volume of The Evergreen: A Northern Seasonal published by Patrick Geddes and Colleagues in Edinburgh.

Towards the close of the 1890s Hornel's colours, while preserving their glow and richness, became more refined and more atmospheric, and his drawing more naturalistic, combining sensuous appeal with emotional and poetic significance. In 1901 he declined election to the Royal Scottish Academy. A member of Glasgow Art Club, Hornel exhibited in the club's annual exhibitions.

In 1901 he acquired Broughton House, a townhouse and garden in Kirkcudbright, which was his main residence for the rest of his life with his sister Elizabeth. There he made several modifications to the house and designed garden taking inspiration from his travels in Japan. he also made an addition of a gallery for his paintings. On his death the house and library were donated for the benefit of the citizens and Broughton House is now administered by the National Trust for Scotland.

There are examples of his works in the museums of Aberdeen, Buffalo, Bradford, St. Louis, Toronto, Montreal, Glasgow, Edinburgh, Leeds, Manchester, Hull, Bath, and Liverpool.

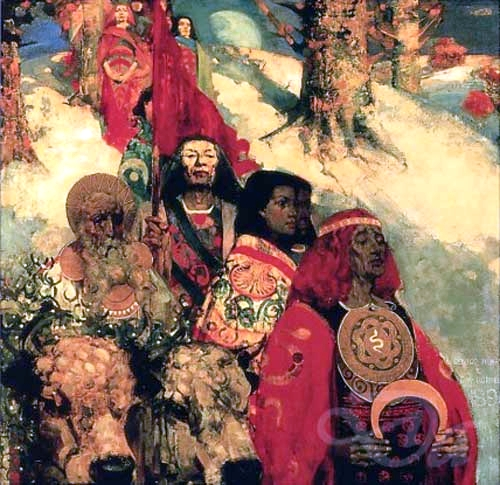
The Druids Bringing in the Mistletoe

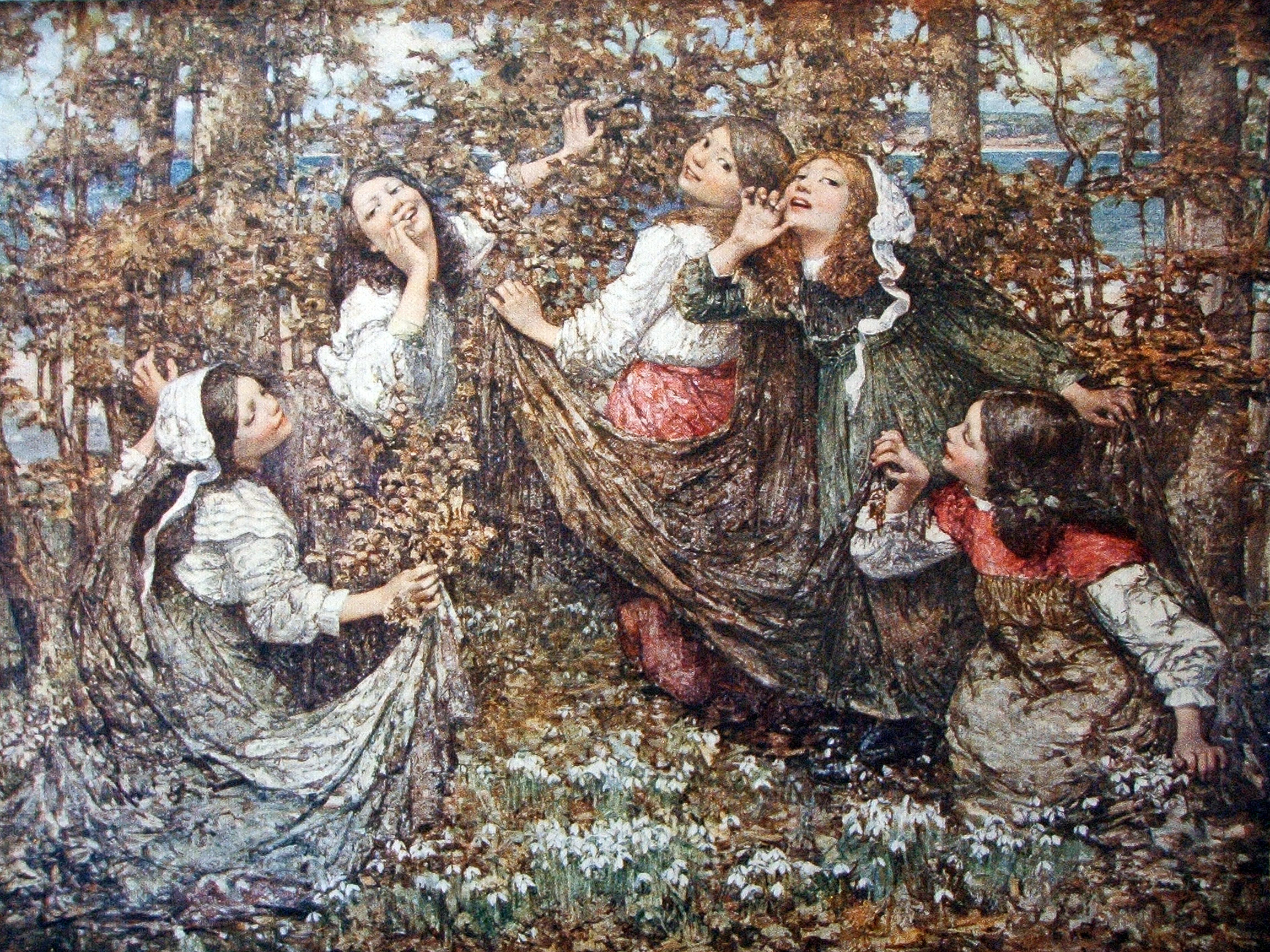
The Earth's Awakening

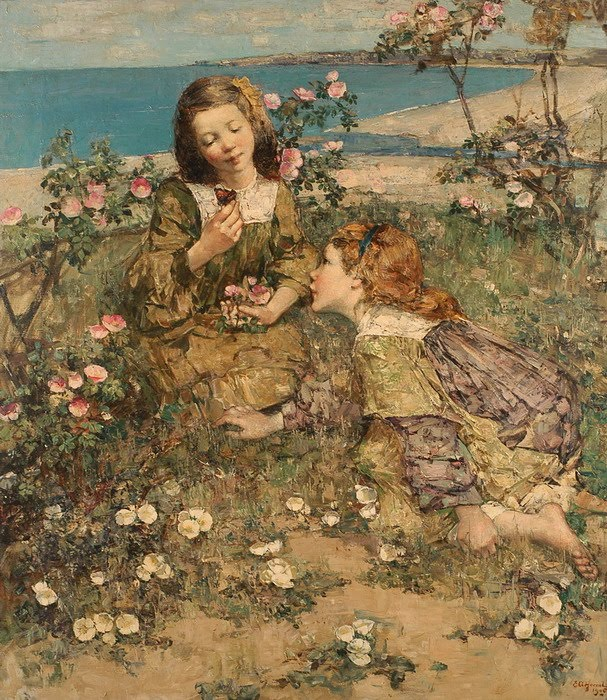
Wonderment

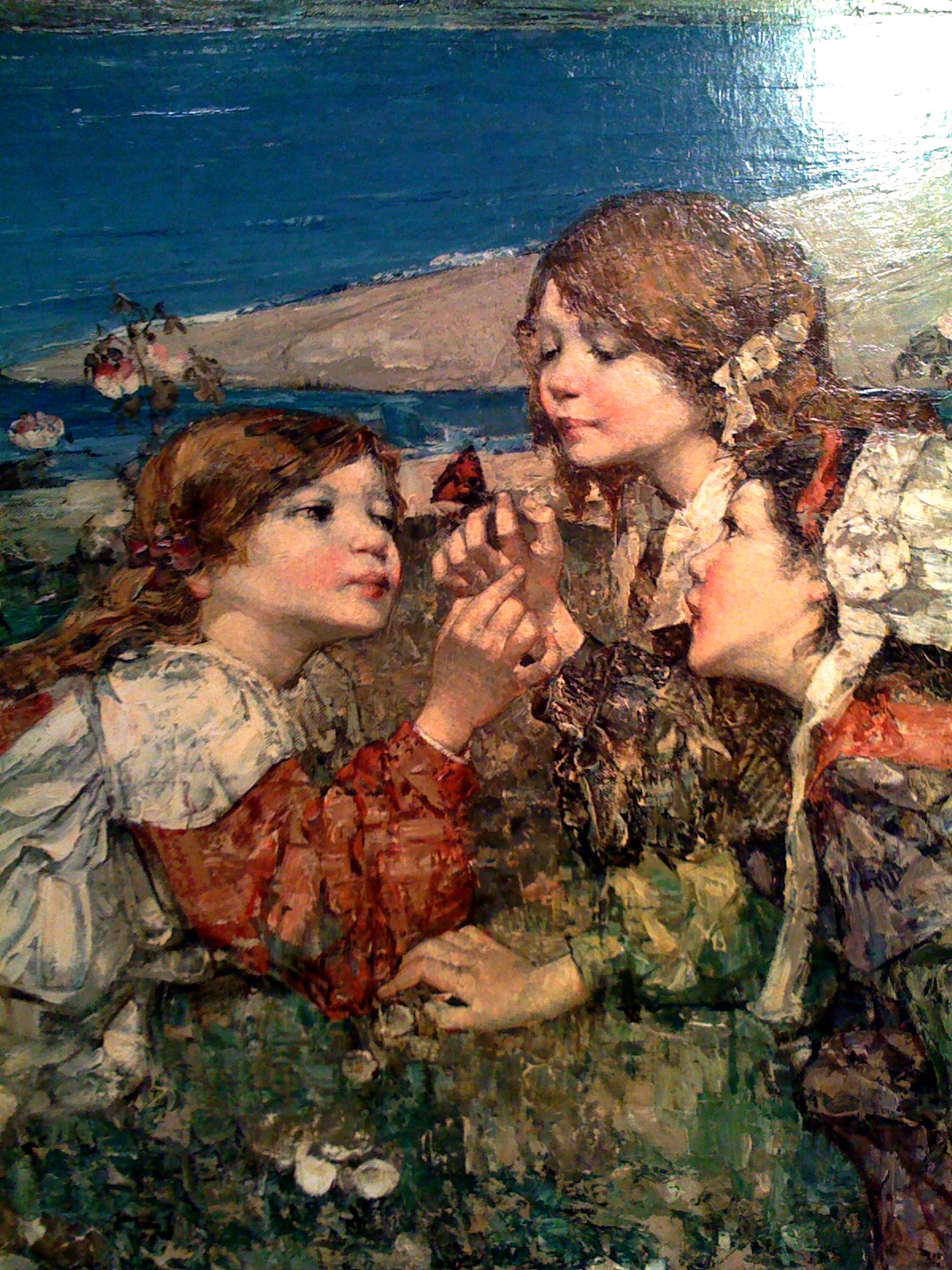
Seashore Roses (detail)
