= Glasgow School =

Scottish art movement

The Glasgow School was a circle of influential artists and designers that began to coalesce in Glasgow, Scotland in the 1870s, and flourished from the 1890s to around 1910. Representative groups included The Four (also known as the Spook School), the Glasgow Girls and the Glasgow Boys. Part of the international Art Nouveau movement, they were responsible for creating the distinctive Glasgow Style (see Modern Style (British Art Nouveau style)).

Glasgow experienced an economic boom at the end of the 19th century, resulting in an increase in distinctive contributions to the Art Nouveau movement, particularly in the fields of architecture, interior design and painting.

== The Four (the "Spook School") ==
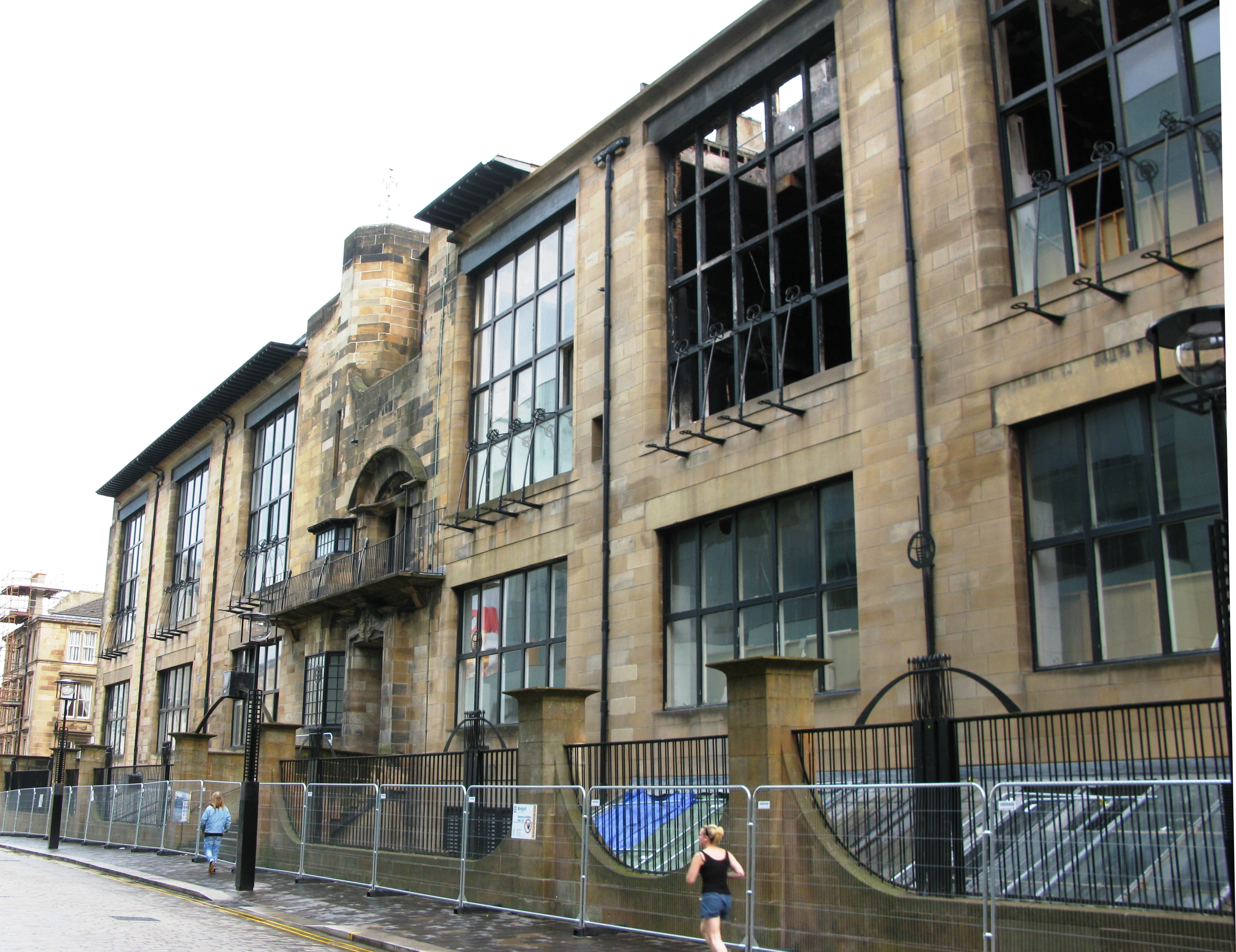
Glasgow School of Art

Among the most prominent definers of the Glasgow School collective were The Four. They were the painter and glass artist Margaret MacDonald, acclaimed architect Charles Rennie Mackintosh (MacDonald's husband), MacDonald's sister Frances and Herbert MacNair. Together, The Four defined the Glasgow Style's fusion of influences including the Celtic Revival, the Arts and Crafts Movement, and Japonisme, which found favour throughout the modern art world of continental Europe. The Four, otherwise known as the Spook School, ultimately made a significant impact on the definition of Art Nouveau. The name, Spook School, or Spooky or Ghoul School, was originally a "derisive epithet" given to their work which "distorted and conventionalized human... form."

== The Glasgow Girls ==
The Glasgow Girls is the name now used for a group of female designers and artists including Margaret and Frances MacDonald, both of whom were members of The Four, Jessie M. King, Annie French, Helen Paxton Brown, Jessie Wylie Newbery, Ann Macbeth, Bessie MacNicol, Norah Neilson Gray, Stansmore Dean, Dorothy Carleton Smyth, Eleanor Allen Moore, De Courcy Lewthwaite Dewar, Marion Henderson Wilson, the silversmith Agnes Banks Harvey and Christian Jane Fergusson. May Wilson and Eliza Bell, among others, continued the tradition of ceramic artistry into the 1940s and 1950s by hand painting various items with floral patterns.

Women were able to flourish in Glasgow during a "period of enlightenment" that took place between 1885 and 1920, where women were actively pursuing art careers and the Glasgow School of Art had a significant period of "international visibility." This is sometimes attributed to the "influential" and "progressive" head of the art school, Fra Newbery, who established an environment in which women could flourish, both as students and as teachers. Women benefited from the new Glasgow Society of Lady Artists (founded 1882) which offered a place for women artists to meet and also had exhibition space. In addition, many art school students and staff were involved in women's suffrage. "Students took turns between classes stitching up banners" for the movement.

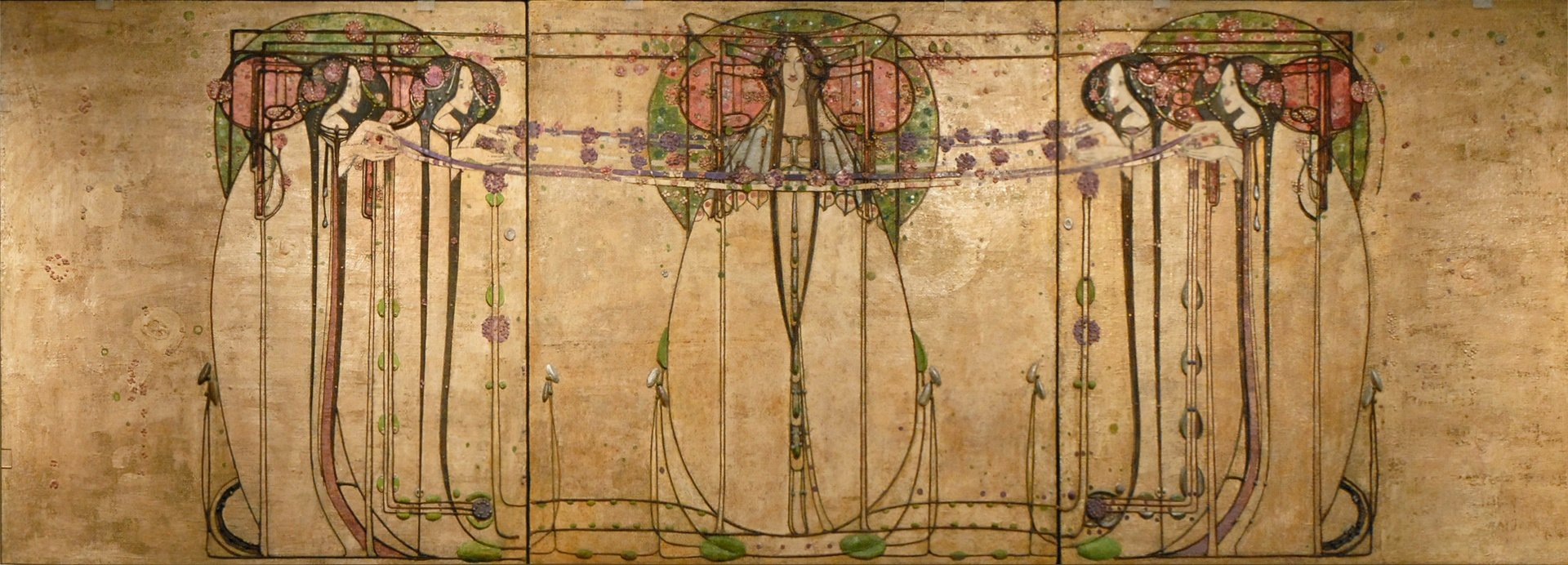

The name "Glasgow Girls" emerged much later. In the 1960s there was an attempt to give due attention to the work of the city's women artists to balance the plentiful discussion of the Glasgow Boys. It is thought that the then head of the Scottish Arts Council William Buchanan was the first to use the name in the catalogue for a 1968 Glasgow Boys exhibition. This "invention" has been called an "ironic reference" to the equivalent men's grouping. The term Glasgow Girls was emphasised by a major exhibition Glasgow Girls: Women in Art and Design 1880–1920 organised by Jude Burkhauser in 1990.

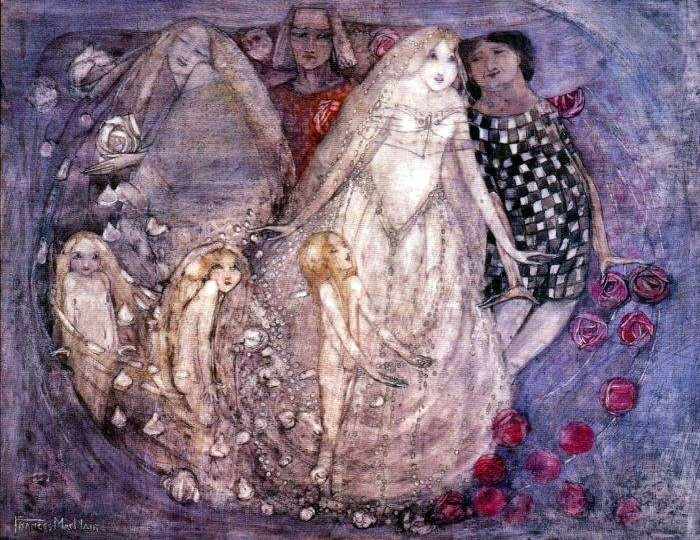
A Paradox by Frances MacDonald, 1905

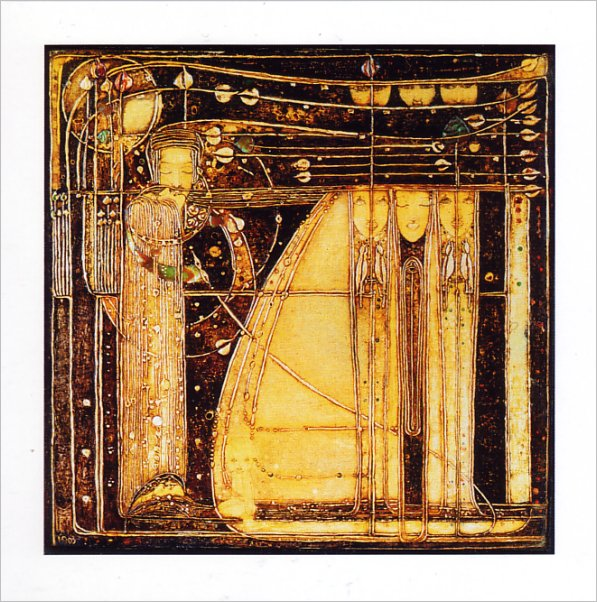
Opera of the Winds by Margaret Macdonald Mackintosh, 1903

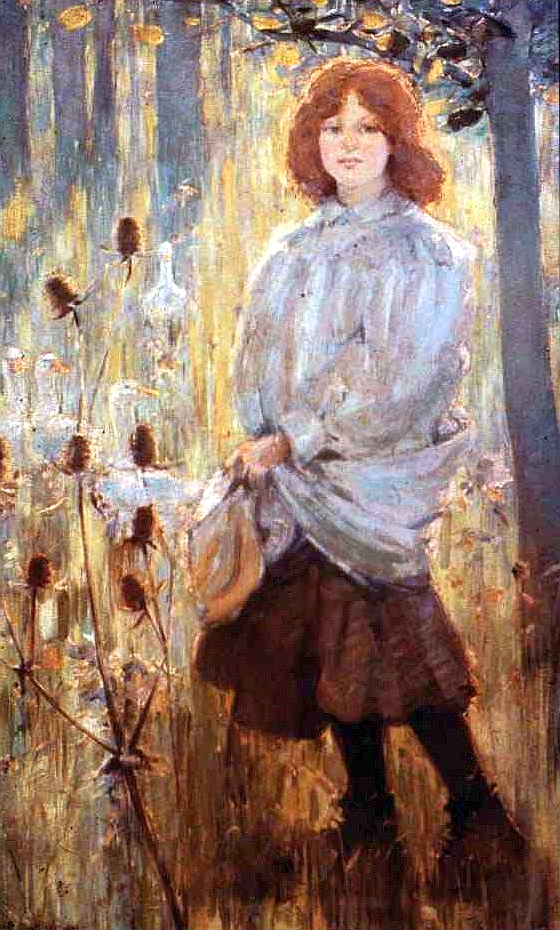
The Goose Girl by Bessie MacNicol, 1898

== The Glasgow Boys ==
Through the 1880s and 1890s, around the same time that the Spook School was gaining prominence, a collective which came to be known as the Glasgow Boys was interpreting and expanding the canon of Impressionist and Post-Impressionist painting. Their subject matter featured rural, prosaic scenes from in and around Glasgow. Their colourful depictions attempted to capture the many facets of the character of Scotland.

The Glasgow Boys consisted of several men, most of whom were trained in, or had strong ties to the city of Glasgow. These men were brought together by a passion for realism and naturalism and this showed through in the pieces they produced. Along with this passion for naturalism, they shared a marked distaste for the Edinburgh oriented Scottish art establishment, which they viewed as oppressive. Driven and motivated by these ideals they embraced change, created masterpieces, and became Scottish icons in the process.

There were three distinct waves of Glasgow Boys. The leading figures of the first wave were James Paterson (1854–1932) and William York Macgregor (1855–1923), and the group used to meet at Macgregor's studio. The second wave was represented in Joseph Crawhall (1861–1913), Thomas Millie Dow (1848–1919), James Guthrie (1859–1930), George Henry (1858–1943), E. A. Hornel (1864–1933), James Whitelaw Hamilton (1860–1932) and E. A. Walton (1860–1922). The third wave of artists were David Gauld (1865–1936), William Kennedy (1859–1918), John Lavery (1856–1941), Harrington Mann (1864–1937), Stuart Park (1862–1933), William Wells (1872–1923), David Young Cameron (1865–1945), Alexander Ignatius Roche (1861–1923), Arthur Melville (1855–1904), Thomas Corsan Morton (1859–1928), James Nairn (1859–1904), George Pirie (1863–1946) and John Quinton Pringle (1864–1925).

Their main influences were that of Japanese print, French Realism including Jules Bastien-Lepage, and James Abbott McNeill Whistler, but all of their experiences around the world greatly impacted on and inspired their work, in particular in Spain, North Africa, and Japan. The group was constantly influenced by what they saw in the world around them and strove to display these images by utilizing the techniques of realism and naturalism; they had a passion to depict things as they actually are. This is one of the reasons that the group often chose to work outdoors. Working outdoors allowed them to produce paintings that were as true to nature as possible and it allowed them to paint realistic objects in their natural environment. They painted real people in real places. The production of naturalistic paintings was new to this time period, and thus their techniques were considered to be innovative. Similarly, the pieces often created a sense of movement, an accurate (or naturalistic) depiction of light and shade, and extremely realistic texture. This made them stand out in the art community.

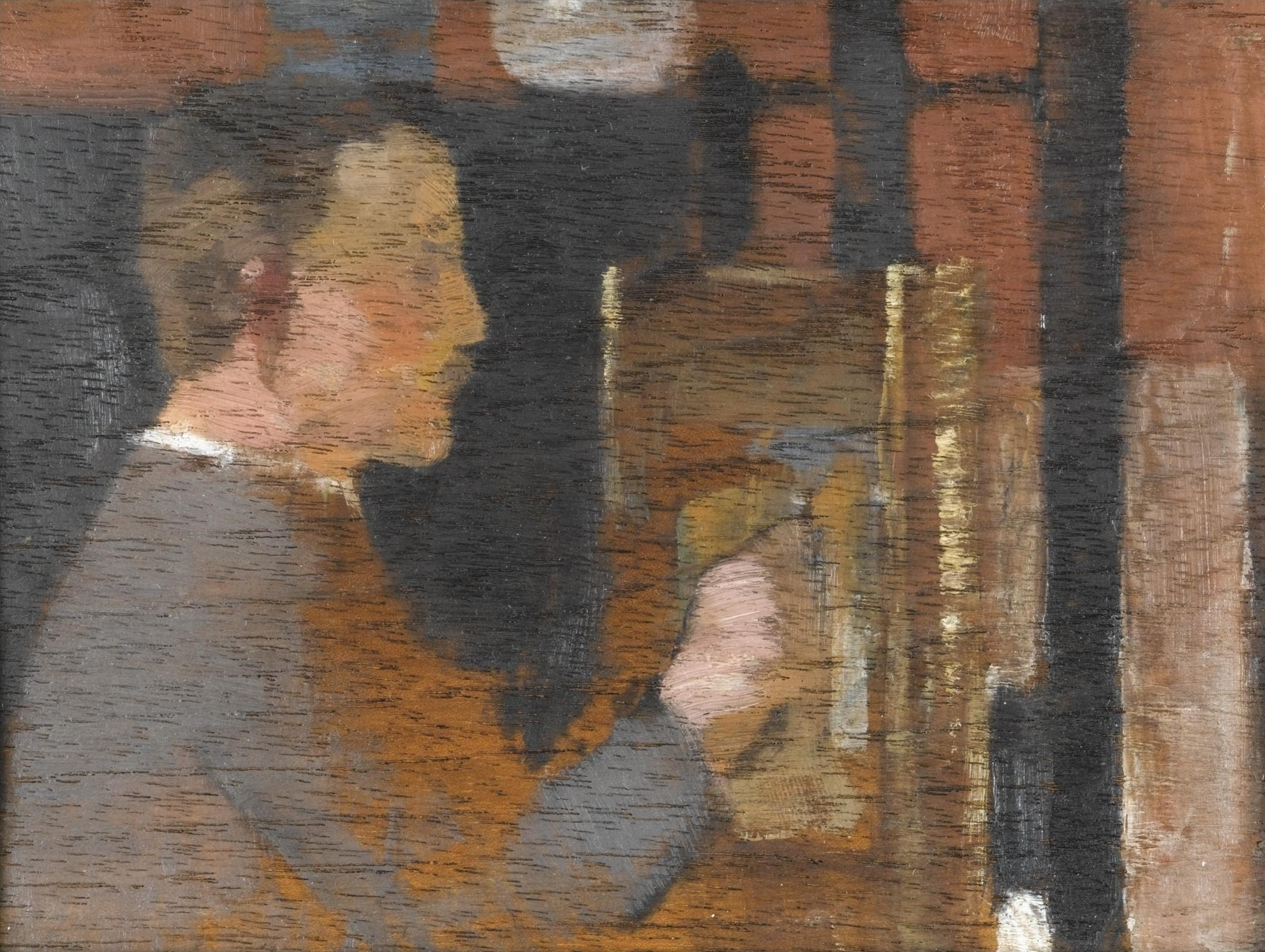
James Guthrie At His Easel by Joseph Crawhall, 1885.

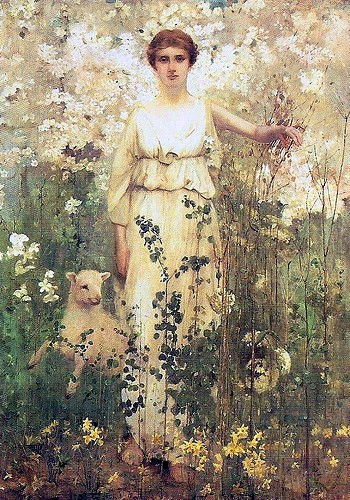
Spring by Thomas Millie Dow, 1886

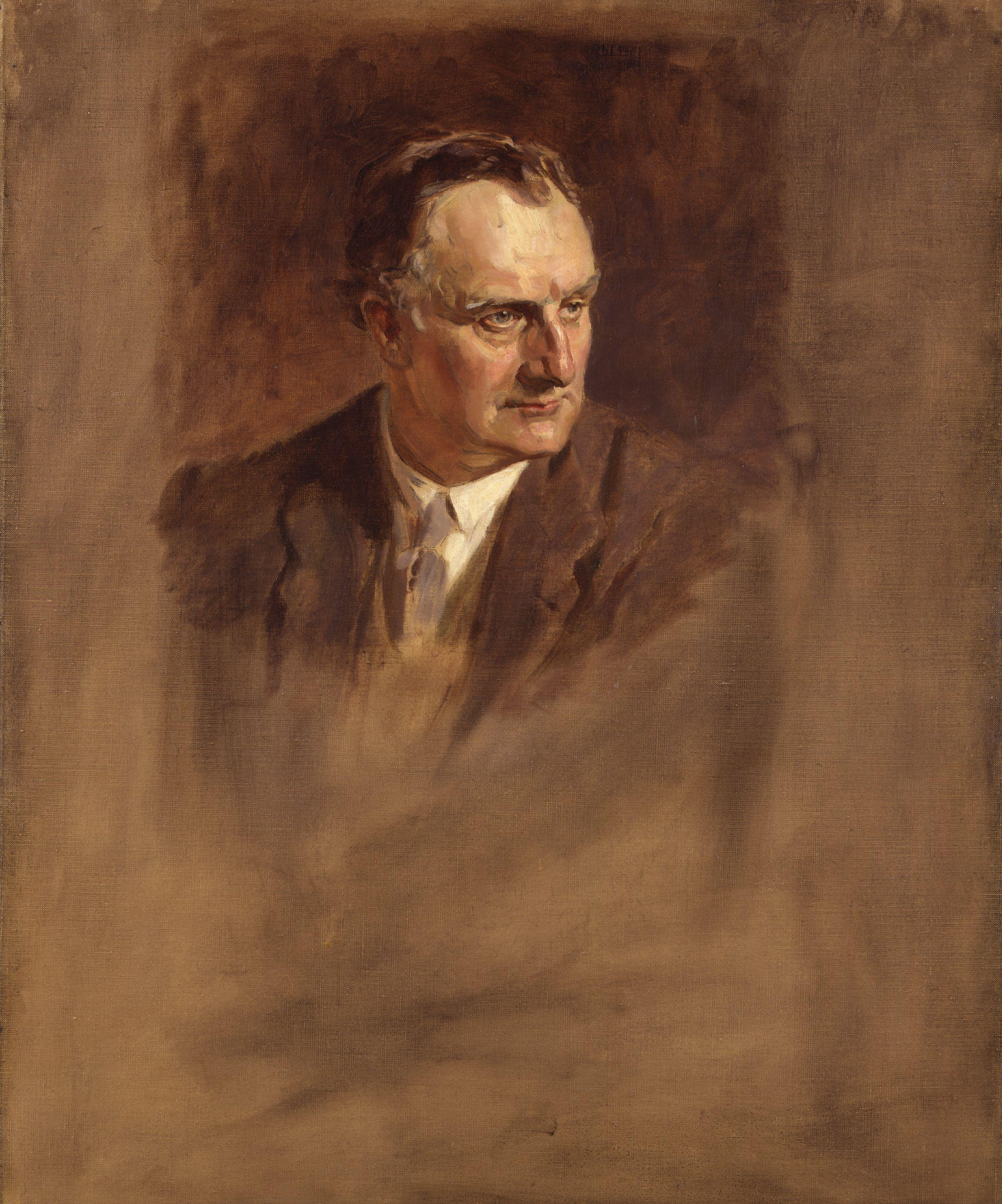
Edward Grey, 1st Viscount Grey of Fallodon by Sir James Guthrie, c. 1924 – c. 1930

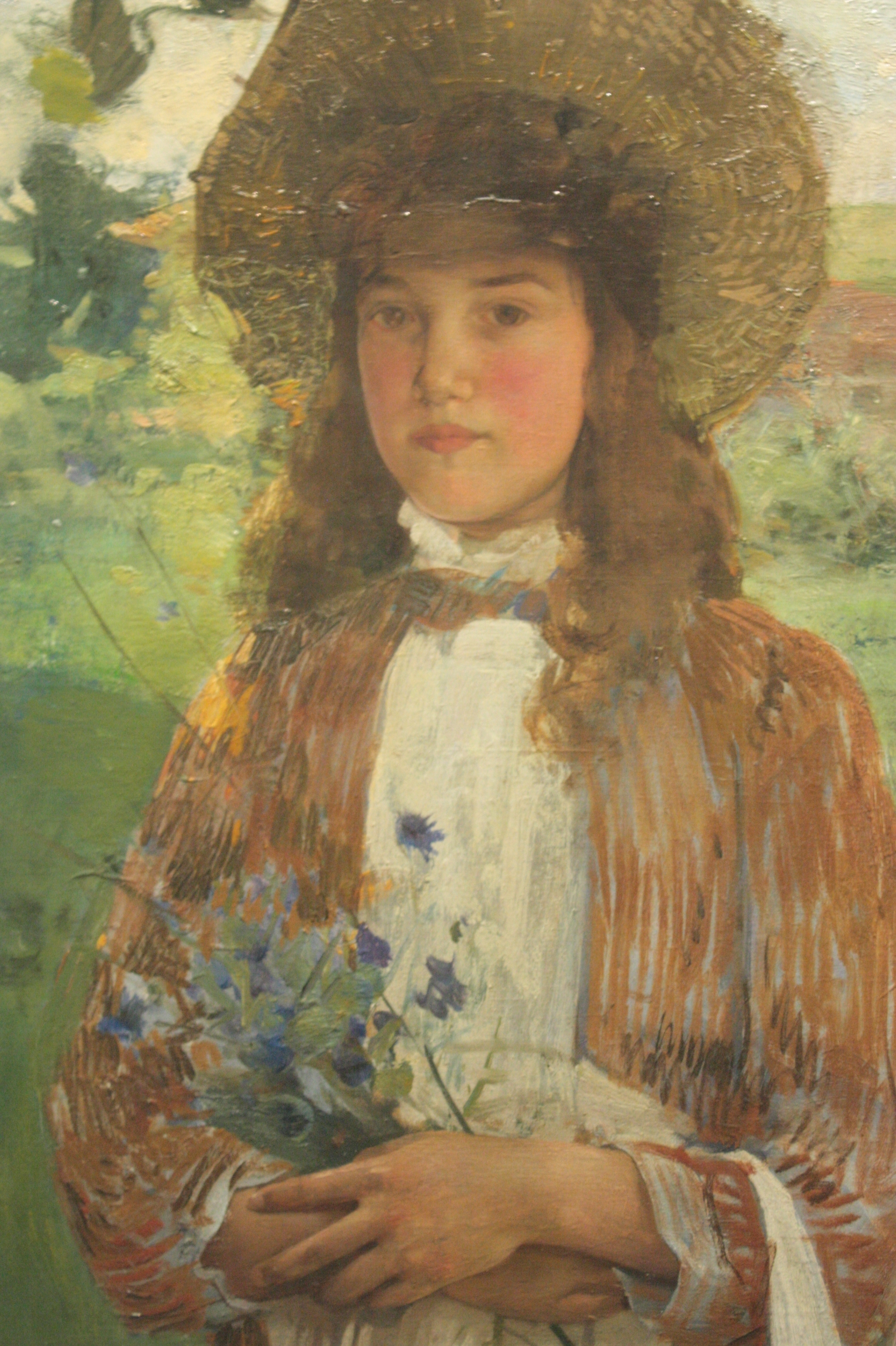
Bluette by Edward Arthur Walton, 1891

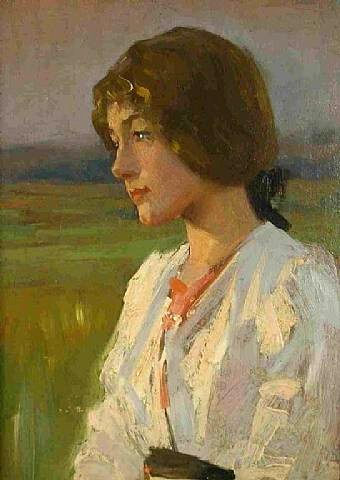
Portrait of a Girl at Dusk by Alexander Mann (date unknown; d. 1908)

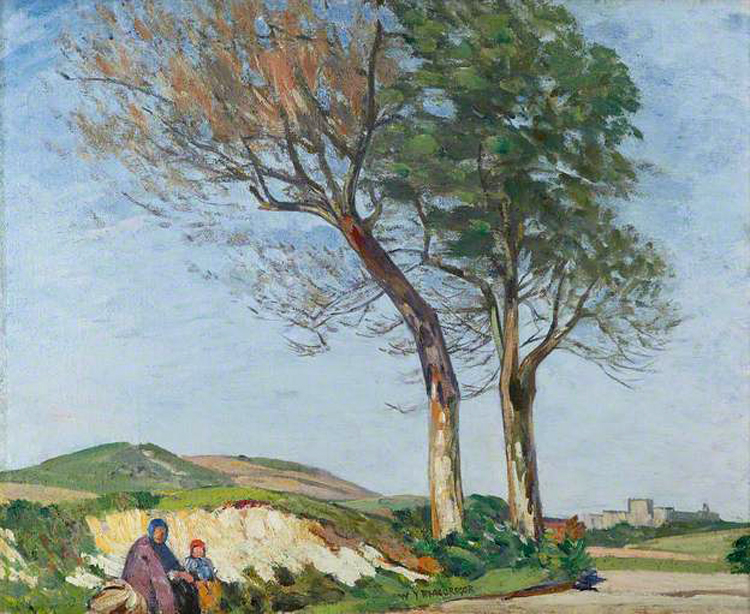
Near Dover by William York Macgregor, 1921

=== Collections and exhibitions ===
A large collection of work from the Glasgow Boys is held in the Kelvingrove Art Gallery and Museum, where one room is dedicated to the group. The museum houses more than 60 of the Boys' pieces that were created between 1880 and 1900, arguably the time period in which their best, and most innovative, pieces were produced. More of their works can be found on display at the Burrell Collection, Broughton House, Paisley Museum and Art Galleries, Walker Art Gallery and the Hunterian Museum and Art Gallery.

== See also ==
- Scottish Colourists
- Ann Macbeth
- Arthur Melville
- George Henry Walton
- Hannah Frank
- Margaret Macdonald Mackintosh
- Frances MacDonald

== Bibliography ==
- Billcliffe, Roger. The Glasgow Boys. John Murray, London. ISBN 9780719560330
- The Glasgow Boys and Girls: Painting in Scotland Book of Postcards: The National Galleries of Scotland.
