= Bessie MacNicol =

Scottish painter (1869–1904)

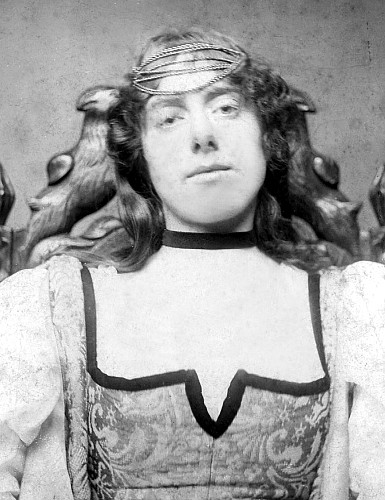
- Born: Elizabeth MacNicol; 5 July 1869; Glasgow, Scotland, United Kingdom
- Died: 4 June 1904 (aged 34); Glasgow, Scotland, United Kingdom
- Education: Glasgow School of Art
- Known for: painting
- Movement: Glasgow Style, Impressionism
- Spouse: Alexander Frew

Elizabeth MacNicol (5 July 1869 – 4 June 1904) was a Scottish painter and member of the Glasgow Girls group of artists affiliated with the Glasgow School of artists.

== Early life and education ==
MacNicol was born in Glasgow, Scotland, on 5 July 1869, the daughter of Peter MacNicol, a teacher and school principal, and Mary Ann Matthews. Several of her siblings died in infancy (including her twin sister Mary), but she grew up with two surviving sisters with whom she shared a penchant for music. She had some health problems consequent on suffering from allergies during the summer months. She attended Glasgow School of Art from 1887 until 1892 and afterwards, at the urging of school director Francis Henry Newbery, studied art in Paris at the Académie Colarossi, which was one of the first of the Paris studios to offer classes in which women trained alongside men. She was thus part of the first wave of women artists who were crossing to Paris from the United Kingdom to further their art education as their male peers had been doing for several generations. However, she apparently did not gain much from her time at Académie Colarossi, feeling that she was being constantly repressed rather than encouraged.

== Career ==
On her return to Scotland, MacNicol moved back into the family home and not long afterwards acquired a studio in St Vincent Street. In 1893 she exhibited Fifeshire Interior at the Royal Scottish Academy (the only time she would exhibit there), and Study of a Head at the Royal Glasgow Institute. In 1895, she exhibited work at the Stephen Goodden Art Rooms in Glasgow, and in 1896 at the Munich Secession Exhibition. That year she spent time in the artist's colony of Kirkcudbright, where she painted the portrait of leading Kirkcudbright artist Edward Atkinson Hornel. In 1899 she married Alexander Frew, a physician and artist, and they lived in the Hillhead area of Glasgow, where she set up a large studio at the back of the house. Both her parents died in 1903, and she was in the late stages of a pregnancy when she died from complications of pre-eclampsia in Glasgow on 4 June 1904, at the age of 34. The child also died. Her husband remarried shortly before his own death by suicide in 1908, and his second wife sold the Hillhead house and all of MacNicol's paintings the same year. This could be one reason that so few of MacNicol's works and papers are known to exist; there are only a few letters and photographs, and no sketchbooks appear to have been found.

MacNicol's paintings in oil and watercolour are influenced by the plein air tradition of the Barbizon School, as well as by the impressionism of James McNeill Whistler and some of her Glasgow contemporaries among the Glasgow Boys such as Hornel. She was known for her masterful command of colour, light, and texture, while her portraits are admired for their solid composition and psychological depth. One contemporary writer, admiring her dextrous touch and expressive color, compared her favourably to Berthe Morisot. Like Morisot, she often painted young, fashionable women posing outdoors, but with a distinctive dappling of leaf shadows that creates a strong overall pattern of alternating light and dark. During her lifetime, her work was exhibited in Scotland and London, as well as in several European and American cities. Today she is included in group known as the Glasgow Girls, among whom are also numbered Margaret MacDonald, Frances MacDonald, Jessie M. King, Jessie Wylie Newbery, Ann Macbeth, and Norah Neilson Gray. The Glasgow Girls were featured in a 1990 traveling exhibition organized by curator Jude Burkhauser and originating at Glasgow's Kelvingrove Art Gallery and Museum. Two of her works are held in the collections of the Kelvingrove Museum (Under the Apple Tree and A Girl of the Sixties) and a self portrait. Others are in the Hunterian Museum and Art Gallery in Glasgow. In July 2024 her 1899 piece The Lilac Sunbonnet was acquired by the National Galleries of Scotland.

Paintings by Bessie MacNicol
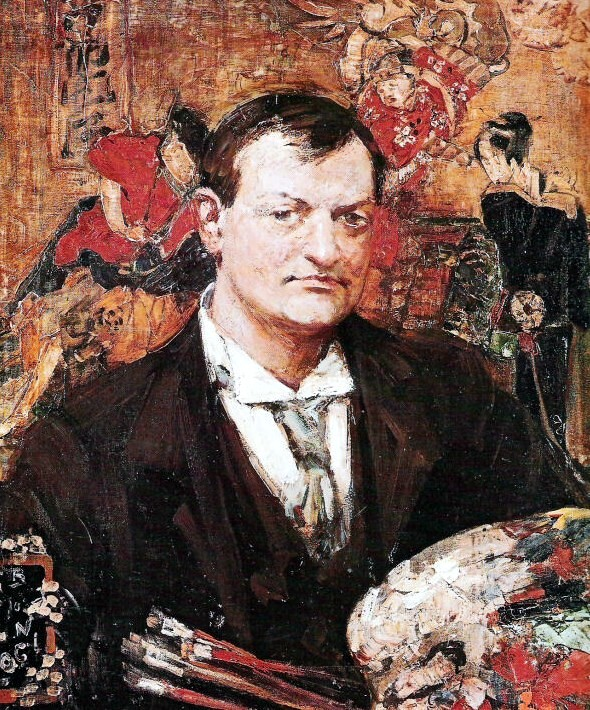
E.A. Hornel, 1896

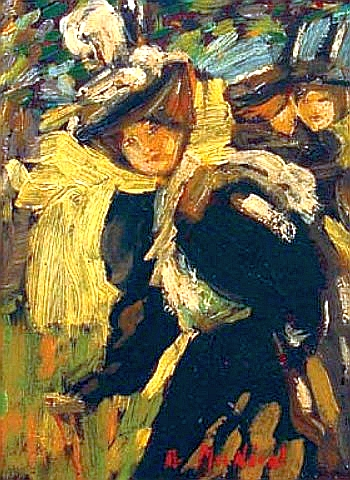
In the Park, date unknown

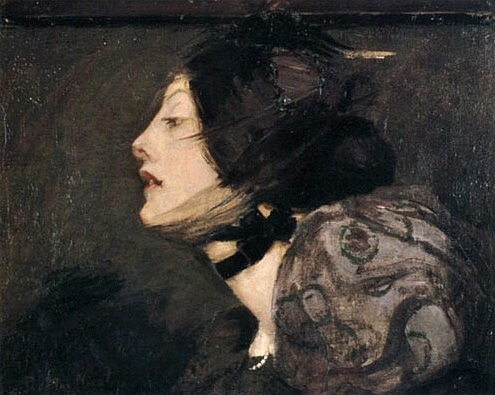
French Girl, 1895

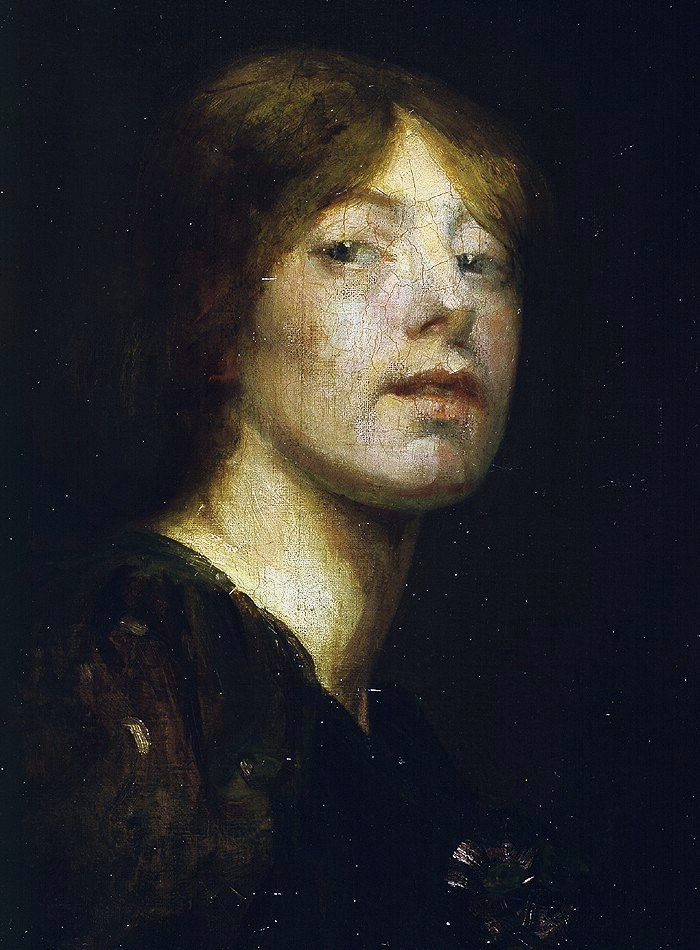
Self-portrait, 1894

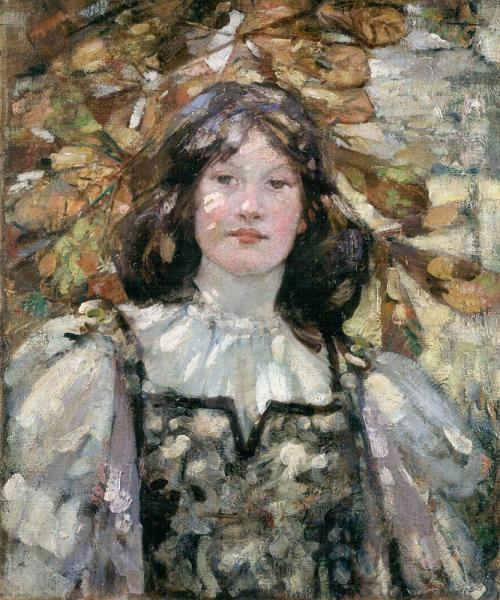
Autumn, 1898

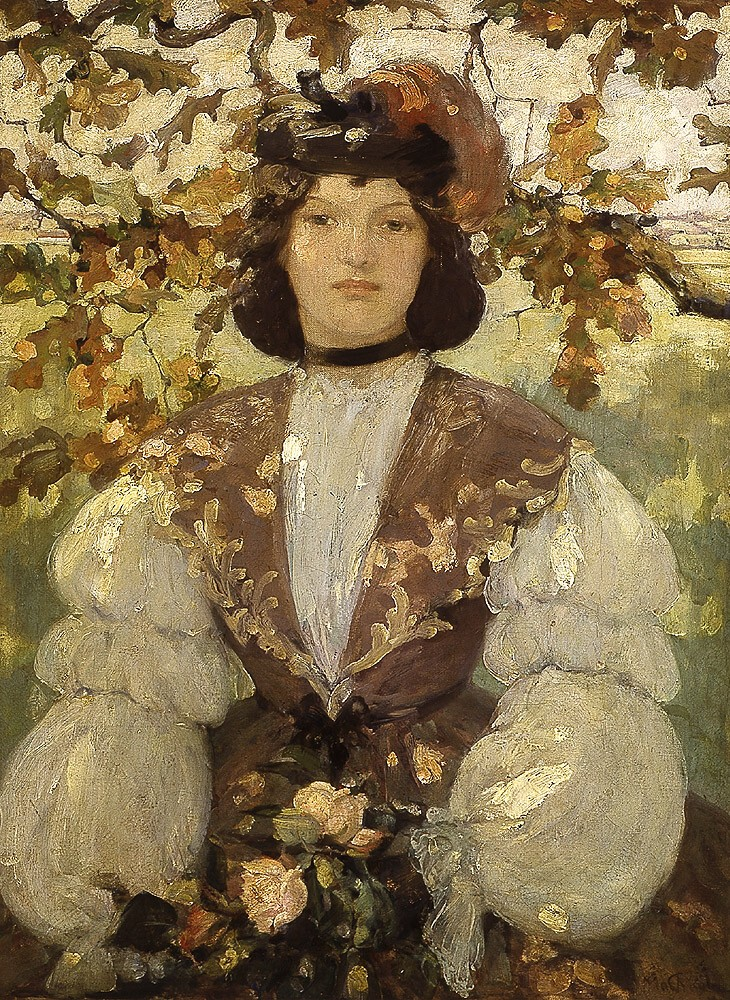
A Girl of the Sixties, 1899

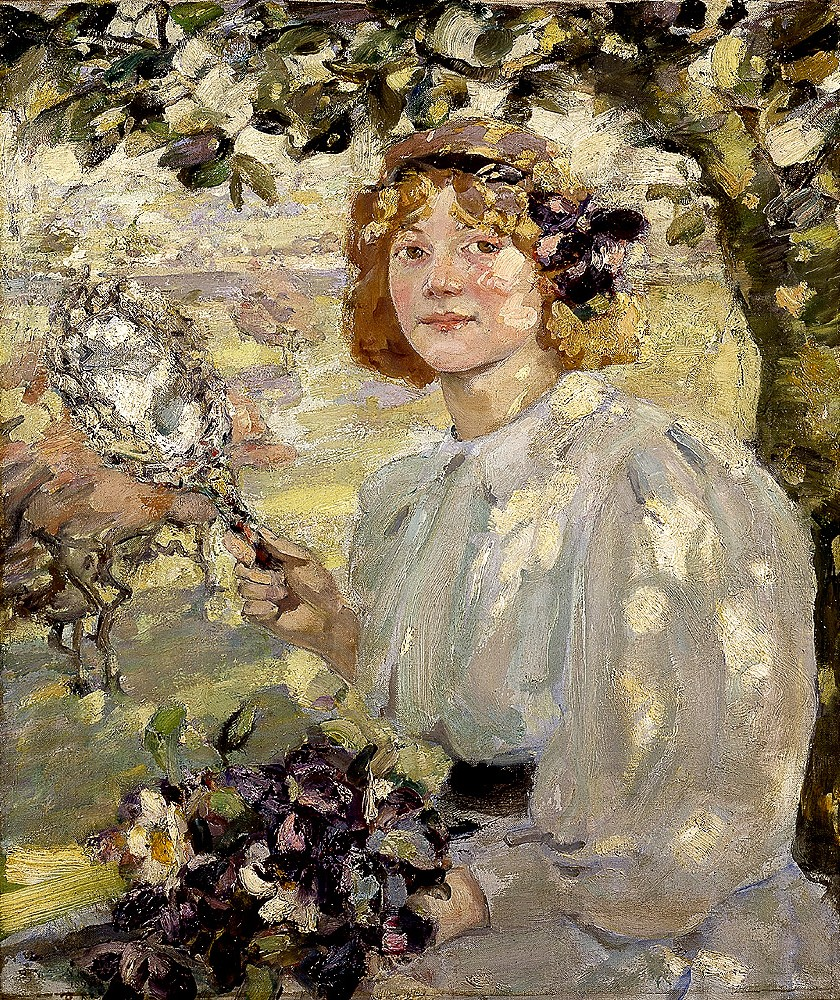
Under the Apple Tree, 1899

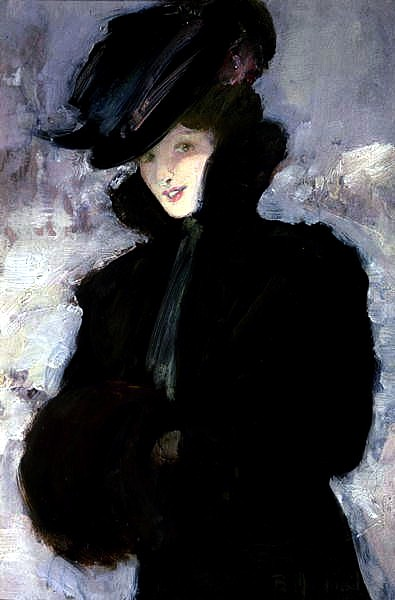
The Fur Coat, date unknown
