= Janet Aitken (artist) =

Scottish artist (1873–1941)

Janet Macdonald Aitken
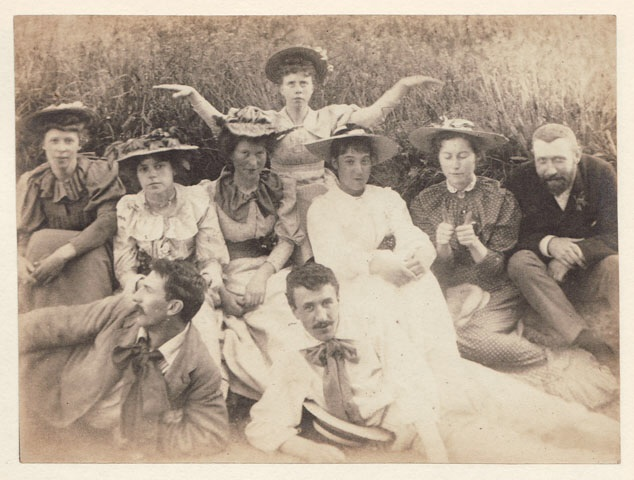
- The Immortals of Glasgow School of Art: At the back: Frances MacDonald middle row L-R: Margaret Macdonald, Katharine Cameron, Janet Aitken, Agnes Raeburn, Jessie Keppie, John Keppie front row L-R: Herbert McNair, Charles Rennie Mackintosh (circa 1894)
- Born: 9 October 1873; Glasgow, Scotland
- Died: 2 October 1941 (aged 67); Troon, Scotland
- Education: Glasgow School of Art; Academie Colarossi
- Known for: Painting, Decorative arts, Design

Janet Macdonald Aitken CBE (9 October 1873–2 October 1941) was a Scottish portrait and landscape painter. She was described by Jude Burkhauser as "one of the leading women proponents of the Glasgow Style."

== Biography ==
Aitken was born in Glasgow where her father, Robert Thomson Aitken, was a well regarded commercial printer and lithographer. Between 1887 and 1902 she studied at the Glasgow School of Art before continuing her studies in Paris at the Academie Colarossi. Returning to Glasgow, after some time in Spain, she became part of the circle of artists associated with Charles Rennie Mackintosh and a member of the informal group of artists known as "The Immortals", which also included Agnes Raeburn, Margaret Macdonald Mackintosh, Jessie Newbery, Ruby Pickering, Katharine Cameron, Jessie Keppie and Frances McNair. Aitken also became a leading member of the Glasgow Society of Lady Artists and won that Society's Lauder Prize in both 1928 and 1937. Aitken was also a metalworker and a member of the Scottish Guild of Handicraft.

Aitken often painted urban scenes and views of old buildings, working in both oils and watercolours. Several of her black and white sketches of Glasgow street scenes were reproduced as postcards. She was a regular and prolific exhibitor with the Royal Scottish Academy, the Glasgow Institute of the Fine Arts and, in the early 1930s, with the Aberdeen Arts Society where she mainly showed portraits. In 1930 the Beaux Arts Gallery hosted an exhibition of some 40 of her landscapes. A memorial exhibition to her, and to Kate Wylie and Elma Story, was held by the Glasgow Society of Lady Artists in 1942.
