= Katharine Cameron =

British artist

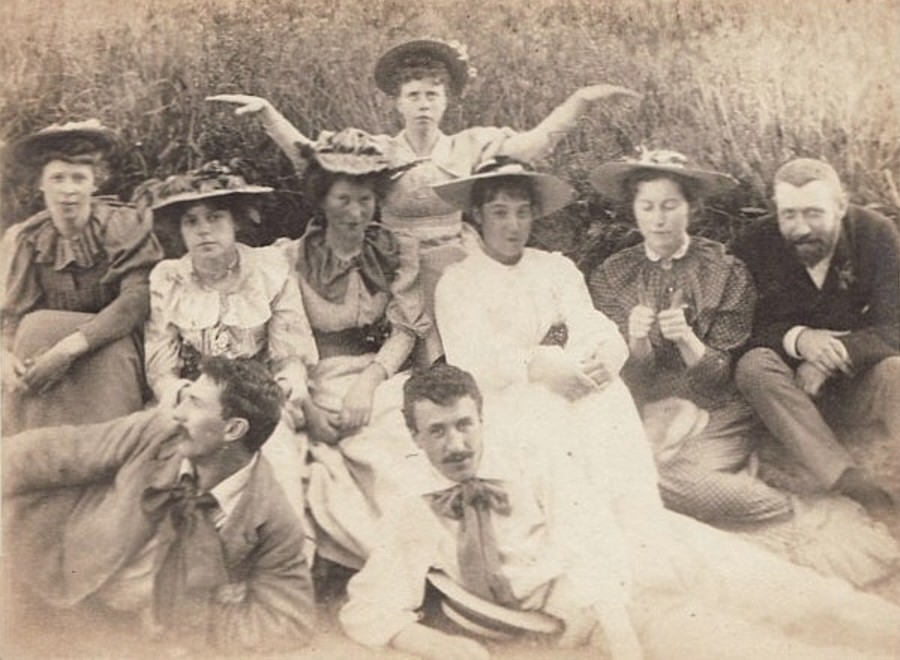
- Back row: Margaret Macdonald middle row L-R: Frances MacDonald, Katharine Cameron, Janet Aitken, Agnes Raeburn, Jessie Keppie, John Keppie front row L-R: Herbert McNair, Charles Rennie Mackintosh (circa 1894).
- Born: 26 February 1874; Glasgow, United Kingdom
- Died: 21 August 1965
- Known for: Painting, Illustration
- Spouse: Arthur Kay (m. 1928)

Katharine Cameron RWS RE (26 February 1874 – 21 August 1965) was a Scottish artist, watercolourist, and printmaker, best known for her paintings and etchings of flowers. She was associated with the group of artists known as the Glasgow Girls.

== Early life and education ==
Born in Hillhead, Glasgow, she was the daughter of the Rev. Robert Cameron and the sister of the artist David Young Cameron.

She studied at the Glasgow School of Art, from 1889 to 1893 where she became associated with a small circle of female students who called themselves 'The Immortals'. The group included the sisters Frances and Margaret Macdonald, Janet Aitken, Agnes Raeburn, Jessie Keppie, John Keppie, Herbet McNair, and Charles Rennie Mackintosh. During her time at the Glasgow School of Art she contributed illustrations for The Yellow Book and the student publication The Magazine.

Around 1902 she travelled to France and enrolled at the Atelier Colarossi, studying under Gustave Courtois.

== Book illustrator ==
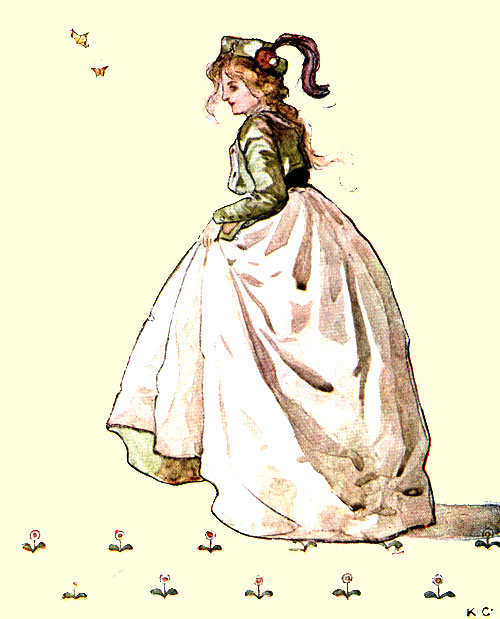
Illustration from Stories from the Ballads Told to the Children

One of the Glasgow Girls, Cameron worked in the Glasgow Style, which blended Art Nouveau, Celtic Revival, Arts and Crafts movement, and Japonisme aesthetics. Her paintings, with their "bold outlines and vivid colors," lent themselves to the book illustration format, and she contracted with London publishers T. C. and E. C. Jack in 1904 to provide art for books of fairytales. Her interest in embroidered materials, fabrics, and costume comes through in her illustrations, as does the influence of Whistler in her use of symbolism. Cameron also designed the bindings for these works.

She illustrated a series of three fairytale books for the Jacks (In Fairyland, The Enchanted Land, and Celtic Tales), which earned majority positive feedback from her artistic contemporaries. Her fourth title for the Jacks, 1909's Legends and Stories of Italy for Children, was part of the publishers' Told to the Children series, for which fellow Scottish artists Phoebe Anna Traquair and Olive Allen Biller also produced illustrations.

Starting in 1907, Cameron also illustrated several gift books for T. N. Foulis' Envelope Book series, which showcased her talent for "delicate romantic watercolor illustrations... reminiscent of early work by the Macdonald sisters and Charles Rennie Mackintosh."

Her final book for the Jacks was published in 1916, titled Flowers I Love. This title, showcasing unusual and exotic plants, signalled a shift in her artistic interest to her "real love," flower painting. Her last piece of book design was the cover for 1939's Treasure Trove in Art.

== Etching career ==
Cameron etched her first plate in 1898. In 1909 she took up the needle again and etched two further plates entitled 'April' and 'The Tryst', each of which depicted bees and blackthorn blossom. Between 1898 and 1938 she etched around eighty eight plates. Influenced by themes such as Scottish folklore, botany, and Japonisme, Cameron developed a signature style which was praised by art critics in international art journals such as The American Magazine of Art and The Art Journal for the "naturalistic and at the same time exceedingly decorative" treatment of her plates whilst having "the true race feeling of the Celt for love and legend."

== Painter of flowers & landscapes ==
Cameron was a prolific watercolourist and this eventually became her predominant medium of choice throughout her career. At the early stages of her career she painted a broad range of subjects ranging from romantic figure studies, Scottish folklore and ballads, as well as flower studies. She exhibited widely, and at the age of 22 she had already been elected to the Royal Scottish Watercolour Society. In a later interview with Tom Honeyman she was quoted as saying "there is nothing so inspiring as painting flowers."

Cameron also produced landscapes and regularly exhibited these alongside her flower studies and still life pictures. Cameron and her husband Arthur Kay, made regular trips to the Scottish Highlands where she spent time sketching the landscape, particularly the area around Connel, Achnacree Moss, Loch Etive, and Benderloch. Her landscapes were lavish in colour and she particularly liked to capture the changing light.

Her work received favourable reviews from art critics. In 1948, art critic R. H. Westwater stated "Miss Cameron gives us not only the delicious texture of flower and leaf, the sense of delicate growth and movement expressed with an impeccably sensitive draughtmanship. She also fills each painting with a pervasive light, a light other than that which actually illuminates her flowers."

Her final one-woman exhibition in 1959 at T&R Annan & Sons, Glasgow consisted of 56 watercolours and drawings of the West Highlands and Islands, which had painted throughout her career.

== Exhibiting history ==
Cameron exhibited widely. Her first was in 1891 at the Royal Glasgow Institute of the Fine Arts, where she exhibited 'September Flowers'. A year later she was elected a member of the Glasgow Society of Lady Artists, and of the Royal Scottish Society of Painters in Watercolour in 1897. In 1920 she was elected an associate of the Royal Society of Painter-Etchers, becoming a fellow in 1964. In 1950 was elected a Fellow of the Royal Society of Arts.

She exhibited widely, including at the Royal Scottish Academy (Edinburgh), the Society of Women Artists, Aitken Dott (The Scottish Gallery, Edinburgh), the Fine Art Society (London), Walker Art Gallery (Liverpool), Annan (Glasgow), James Connell & Sons (Glasgow & London), and Goodspeed's (Boston).

== Books illustrated ==
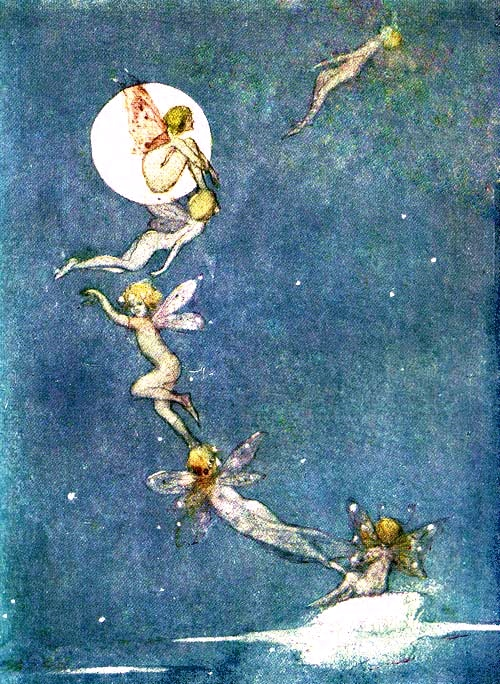
Illustration from Stories from the Ballads Told to the Children

Several were published by T. C. & E. C. Jack of London in its Told to the Children series, edited by Louey Chisholm.

- The Yellow Book (1897), as one of multiple illustrators
- Mary Macgregor – Stories of King Arthur's Knights (Jack, 1905)
- Charles Kingsley - The Water Babies, Told to the Children by Amy Steedman (Jack, 1905)
- Louey Chisholm - The Storks and Other Stories for the Six Year Old (Jack, 1905)
- Louey Chisholm – The Enchanted Land (Jack, 1906)
- Friedrich de la Motte Fouqué - Undine, Told to the Children by Mary Macgregor (Jack)
- Elizabeth Barrett Browning – Rhyme of the Duchess May (T. N. Foulis, c. 1907)
- Aucassin and Nicolette (12th Century French Song Story) (1908)
- Amy Steedman – Legends and Stories of Italy (Jack, 1909)
- Louey Chisholm – In Fairyland: Tales Told Again (Jack, 1910)
- Louey Chisholm – Celtic Tales, Told to the Children (Jack, 1910)
- James Richmond Aitken – In a City Garden (Foulis, 1913)
- Edward Thomas – The Flowers of Love: An Anthology of Flower Poems A Series of 24 Drawings in Colour (Jack, 1916)
- US edition, The Flowers I Love: A Series of Twenty-Four Drawings in Colour by Katharine Cameron, with an Anthology of Flower Poems, selected by Edward Thomas (Stokes, 1917), LCCN 17--26887Iolo Aneurin Williams – Where the Bee Sucks: A Book of Flowers (Poems Chosen by I. A. Williams) (Medici Society, 1929)
- Fiona Grierson – Haunting Edinburgh (John Lane, 1929)
- Katherine Cameron – Iain the Happy Puppy: Being the Autobiography of a West Highland Terrier (Moray Press, 1934)

== Later life ==
In 1928, at the age of 54 she married art collector Arthur Kay (1860–1939), whose interest in Jacobite and Scottish artifacts played a role in building the collection of the Scottish Modern Arts Association. They lived in Edinburgh together until Kay's death in 1939. After Kay's death, Cameron carried on painting and exhibiting but stuck predominantly to flowers as there was no one to drive her to the Highlands to paint the scenery.

Cameron died in 1965 at the age of 91.

== Collections ==
Cameron's work is represented in a number of public collections, including

- National Galleries of Scotland, Edinburgh
- Glasgow Museums, Glasgow
- Hunterian Art Gallery, Glasgow
- Aberdeen Art Gallery, Aberdeen
- British Museum, London
- Victoria & Albert Museum, London
- Tate, London
- The Fleming Collection, London
- Washington Library of Congress, Washington D.C.

== See also ==
- List of Orientalist artists
- Orientalism
