= Agnes Raeburn =

Scottish artist

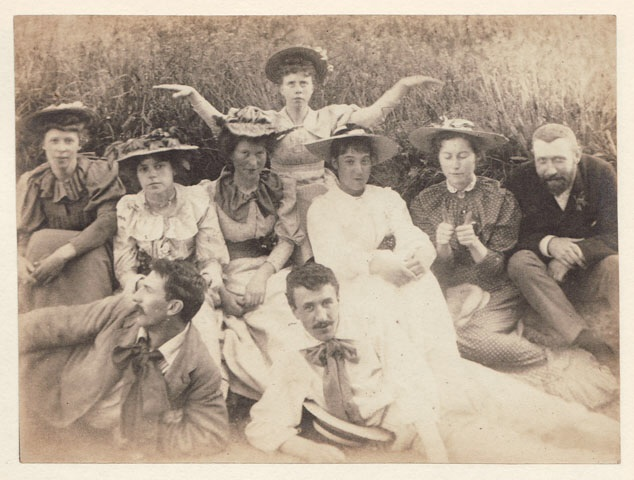
- The Immortals of Glasgow School of Art: At the back: Frances MacDonald middle row L-R: Margaret Macdonald, Katharine Cameron, Janet Aitken, Agnes Raeburn, Jessie Keppie, John Keppie front row L-R: Herbert McNair, Charles Rennie Mackintosh (circa 1894)
- Born: 8 April 1872; Glasgow, Scotland
- Died: 3 August 1955 (aged 83); Edinburgh, Scotland
- Education: Glasgow School of Art
- Known for: Decorative Arts
- Movement: Glasgow Style,

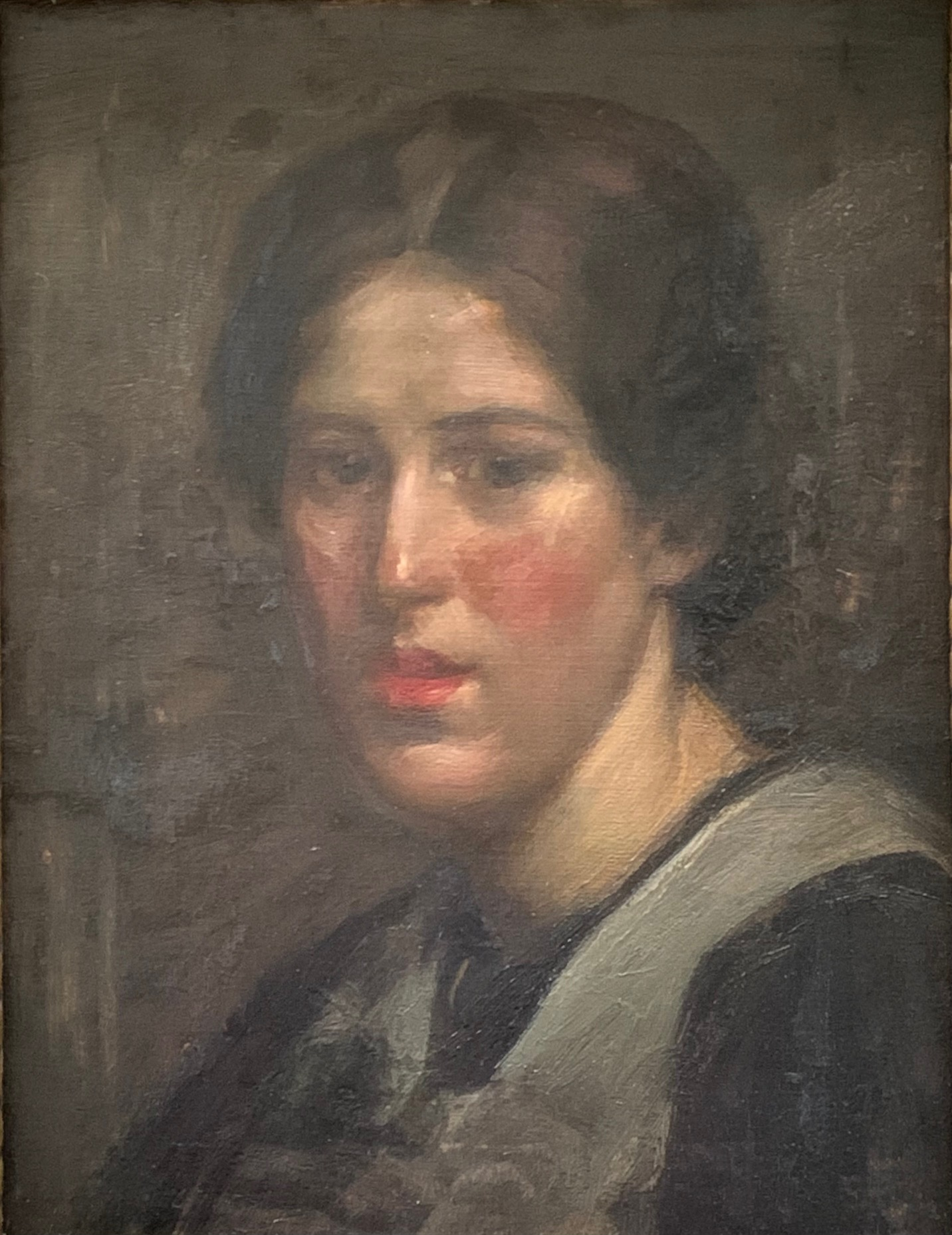
Agnes Middleton Raeburn (unsigned painting attributed to Alexander Ignatius Roche)

Agnes Middleton Raeburn (8 April 1872- 3 August 1955) was a Scottish member of the informal group of artists known as "The Immortals".

== Life ==
Raeburn was born in Glasgow to corn merchant James Raeburn and wife Agnes in 1872. She was the youngest of six siblings, including Charles and Lucy Raeburn. Following the death of her mother when she was seven, Raeburn and her siblings were raised by their father. In 1887, at the age of 15, she obtained a place at Glasgow School of Art and she was there for five years. Her tutors included Fra Newberry. During her time at school Raeburn contributed to the student publication, The Magazine, created by Charles Rennie Mackintosh. In 1903 she became the art teacher at Laurel Bank School in Glasgow. She was involved with a Glasgow-based artistic group known as "The Immortals". This group also included Janet Aitken, Margaret Macdonald Mackintosh, Jessie Newbery, Ruby Pickering, Katharine Cameron, Jessie Keppie and Frances McNair.

In 1939 she returned to teach at the Laurel Bank School and the following year she led the Glasgow Society of Lady Artists' Club as President for three years. Raeburn exhibited her art widely. She died in Edinburgh in 1955.

== Works ==
- Winter Sunshine, Inveran Farm
- Still Life of Violets
- Still Life: Anemones
- Still life - A Glass Vase of Pansies
- Spring, Dalry
- Richmond Castle
- Jug of Chrysanthemums
- Vase of Mixed Flowers
- A Still Life of Primroses
- The Blue Pool
- Fountain Bleau
- Still Life of Roses in a Blue Vase
- A Quiet River Bend
- A Sunny Day at Loch Earn
- Purple Pansies
- Pink Roses
- Pink-Centred Roses
- Roses and Violas
