= Jessie Keppie =

Scottish artist

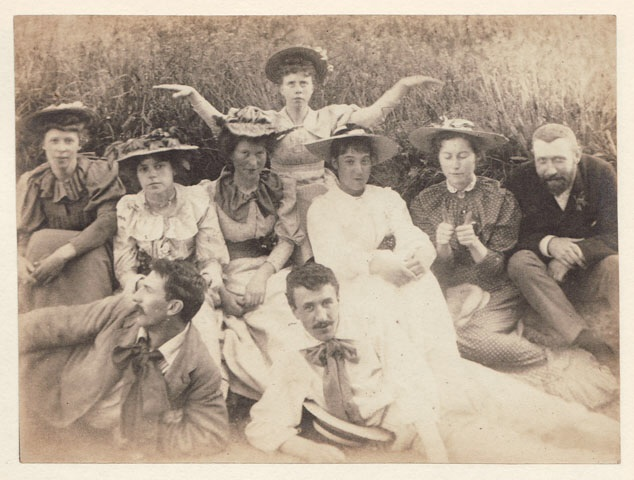
- The Immortals of Glasgow School of Art: At the back: Frances MacDonald middle row L-R: Margaret Macdonald, Katharine Cameron, Janet Aitken, Agnes Raeburn, Jessie Keppie, John Keppie front row L-R: Herbert McNair, Charles Rennie Mackintosh (circa 1894)
- Born: 1868; Glasgow, Scotland
- Died: 1951 (aged 82–83); Prestwick, Scotland
- Education: Glasgow School of Art
- Known for: Decorative Arts, Design, Art
- Movement: Glasgow Style
- Awards: Lauder Prize, 1930

Jessie Keppie (1868 - 1951) was an artist from Glasgow, Scotland, described as one of the "leading women proponents of the Glasgow Style".

== Biography ==
Keppie was born in 1868. Her mother was named Helen Cuthbertson (born Hopkins) while her father, James Keppie imported and sold tobacco. In 1888 she was the fourth member of her Glasgow family to study at the Glasgow School of Art following her siblings. Jane, Helen and John Keppie. She created a Persian carpet which took a silver medal in the National Competition during her second year of study in 1889.

In 1902, Keppie took part in the Scottish National Exhibition in Edinburgh. She performed in an allegorical and historical Arthurian masque created by Jessie M King and Mrs Allan D Mainds. Other participants in this event were the artists James Craig Annan, Agnes Raeburn, and Margaret Macdonald. Also in 1902, Keppie joined the Glasgow Lady Artists' Club and served as their Treasurer during 1922 and as the Club's President from 1928 to 1931.

Keppie was a member of the informal group of artists known as "The Immortals", which also included Agnes Raeburn, Margaret Macdonald Mackintosh, Jessie Newbery, Ruby Pickering, Katharine Cameron, Janet Aitken and Frances McNair.

She was a suffragist, subscribing to the Glasgow and West of Scotland Association for Women's Suffrage.

== Personal life ==
Keppie is reported to have been engaged to Charles Rennie Mackintosh, who broke off the engagement in favour of a relationship with Margaret Macdonald Mackintosh. Others have suggested that it was not an engagement, rather an informal "understanding".

She died in Prestwick in 1951.

== Works ==
- Autumn (1894)
- Pansies (1895)
- Dog Roses (1899)
- A sunlit courtyard, Generalife, Grenada (1909)
- Chateau Gilliard
- Gathering Firewood
- The budding rose above the rose full blown
- Pink geraniums and a butterfly
- Pink carnations
- Honeysuckke
- Fuchsia
- Summer garden
- Ostend
- The road to the farm
