= Jude Burkhauser =

American artist, museum curator & researcher (1947-1998)

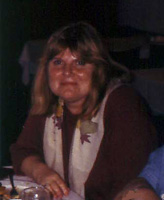
Jude Burkhauser in 1996

Jude Burkhauser (10 September 1947 – 19 September 1998) was an American artist, museum curator and researcher born into a blue-collar family in Trenton, New Jersey.

== Glasgow Girls Exhibition, 1990 ==
Jude Burkhauser is best known for bringing together the widely acclaimed Glasgow Girls exhibition held at Glasgow Kelvingrove Museum in 1990 and for editing the accompanying exhibition catalogue, Glasgow Girls: Women in Art and Design 1880-1920. The retrospective exhibition brought together the talents of women artists and designers who gathered around Glasgow School of Art between 1880 and 1920. The “Glasgow Girls” included women such as Jessie Newbery, Ann Macbeth, Bessie MacNicol and the sisters Frances Macdonald and Margaret Macdonald.

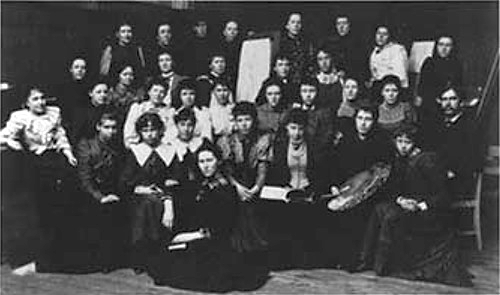
Glasgow Girls: Frances Macdonald, unknown, Ruby Pickering, Margaret Macdonald, Agnes Raeburn, Katharine Cameron and in front Janet Aitken.

In a review, critic Lynne Walker commended Burkhauser for the exhibition's achievement in demonstrating that "much of the powerful visual culture of Glasgow c.1900 was produced by and for women". The exhibition was held in the same year that Glasgow was awarded City of Culture and was one of the programme's major successes.

== Feminist Polemic ==
Burkhauser arrived at Glasgow School of Art in 1987 on a Rotary International Scholarship to do postgraduate research on the subject of Scottish women artists and remained in the city until 1991. Alongside her profiling of female artists, Burkhauser’s highly publicised falling out with Glasgow Museums, and in particular with the Kelvingrove Museum chief Julian Spalding, over plans to exhibit the 'Glasgow Girls' internationally added to her fierce reputation and tenacious character. The dispute ended in litigation with Burkhauser eventually creating her own company to produce the exhibition.

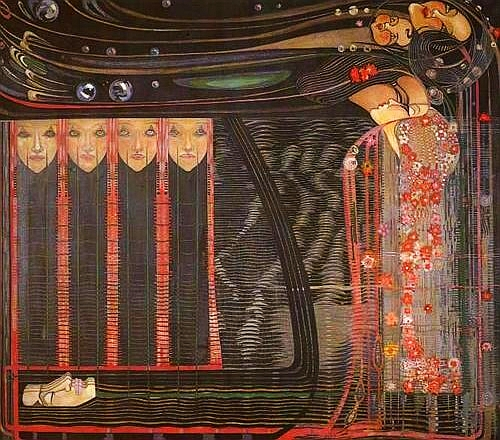
Margaret Macdonald - The Opera of the Seas

The hard-fought battle was a challenge to the perceived masculinity of Glasgow's leading art institutions. In the catalogue, Burkhauser commented that “Young women in the arts have been starved for stories of other women, tales of these maverick sisters whom they might learn from [...] We followed in one another’s footsteps, knocking on doors, asking the same questions, rediscovering fire, the wheel, electricity, because there was no record of our past.” In this respect, the 'Glasgow Girls' exhibition is deemed a triumph in the course of art history for its promotion of Scottish female artists. Burkhauser's dedication to its success was evident in the use of her own property as the insurance to bring Margaret Macdonald's painting The Opera of the Seas (1915) to Glasgow from Germany. A section of this painting appears on the cover of the published exhibition catalogue.

== Artistic career ==
Burkhauser trained at Moore College of Art from 1965 to 1970. She taught elementary school art in the Hamilton Township N.J. school district from 1970 to 1971. She worked as a children's librarian and as a director at the Ewing Headquarters Library, Mercer County N.J. 1973–1979, having received a Master of Library Science degree from Rutgers University in 1976. She served as a director and artist-in-residence for the North Cape May county art league in New Jersey, 1983–1984. During this period she also founded the Cape May Writers' Co-op and published a book of her own poetry, Giving Sorrow Words, in 1984. As an artist she worked across several media including painting, tapestry and environmental art. She was an established member of the female artists’ group Guerrilla Girls and a strong feminist voice. She had a love for railway architecture and during her years in Cape May, lived in a converted train station which she had restored as a local history library. This formed part of a thesis project for a degree in Library Science studied at Rutgers University. Burkhauser was later commissioned to create an installation in the roof trusses of the Hielanman’s Umbrella for the Glasgow Garden Festival in 1988 and the railway history mosaic, now permanently exhibited at Glasgow Central Station.

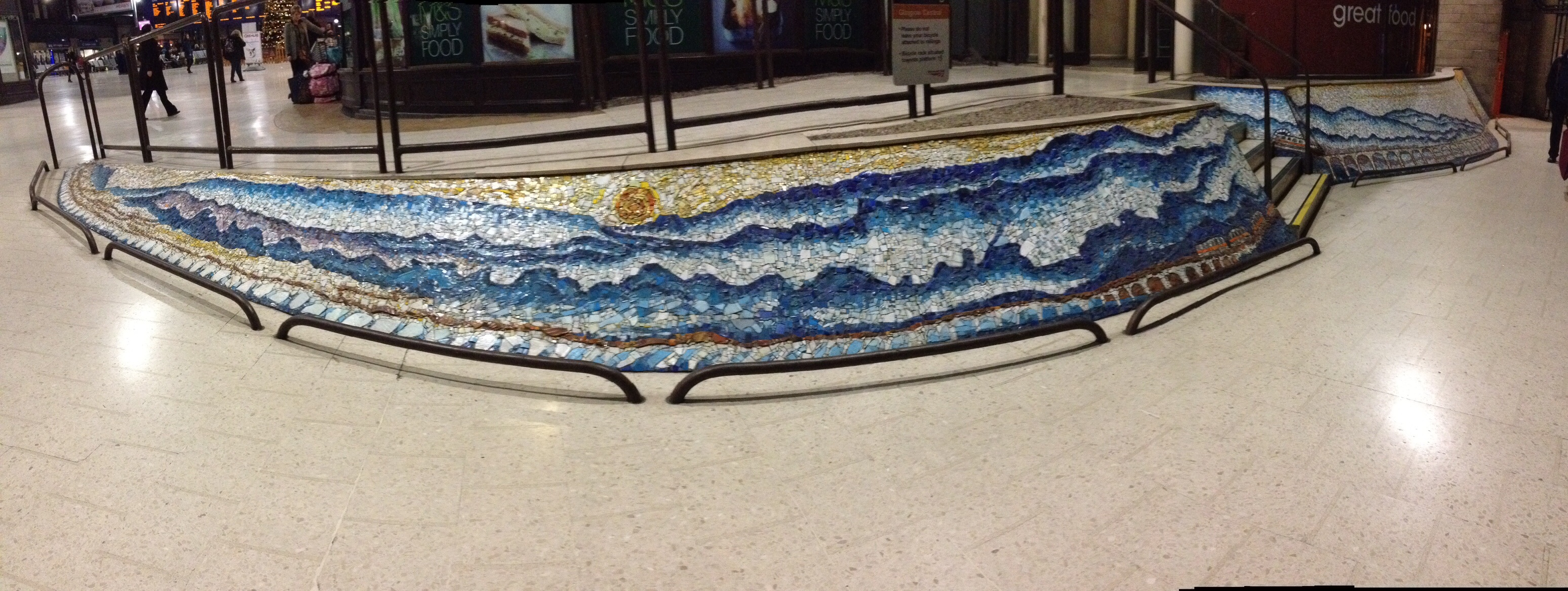
Jude Burkhauser, Railway history mosaic in Glasgow Central Station

While living in Scotland, Burkhauser enjoyed visiting the eco-village community at Findhorn in Moray which was a retreat from the troubles she encountered in Glasgow. At Findhorn, she became interested in bark drawing and began working on a series of drawings on Mexican bark paper entitled "The Spirits in the Wood."

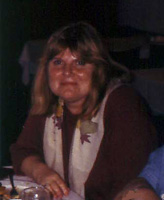
Jude Burkhauser, June 1996

== Death ==
Jude Burkhauser died in 1998 from breast cancer, nine days following her 51st birthday.
