= Olive Biller =

Olive Allen Biller, an artist and illustrator, was born in Ormskirk, Lancashire on 17 October 1879 and died on 15 October 1957 in Vancouver, British Columbia, Canada. She published illustrations under her maiden name Olive Allen and her married name Olive Allen Biller.

== Career ==
Biller initially studied design, illustration, and various arts and crafts at the School of Architecture and Applied Art at University College, Liverpool (now known as University of Liverpool School of Architecture), commencing October 1898. There, she was taught by Robert Anning Bell, and was particularly mentored by Herbert MacNair. In 1900, After a brief time at the Lambeth School of Art, London, she attended the Slade School of Art, London. She studied most notably with Henry Tonks of whom she made a satirical drawing (now in the collection of the Strang, University College London). From 1901, as Olive Allen, she was an illustrator of children's books and Christmas annuals, chiefly for publisher T. C. & E. C. Jack. Some titles were translated into German and enjoyed wide circulation. She also contributed cartoons, illustrations, plays and at least one short story to the periodical Girl's Realm.

Her illustrations are in keeping with those of other British illustrators associated with the Arts and Crafts Movement, such as Walter Crane; the imaginative book illustrators, such as Arthur Rackham and Aubrey Beardsley; and the comic sensibilities of women illustrators such as Mabel Dearmer. Biller exhibited at the Vancouver Art Gallery and other Canadian venues. A substantial corpus of her work was donated by Jill Sims, the artist's daughter, to the University of British Columbia.

In 1912, she emigrated to Canada and married John Biller (an old friend) in Saskatchewan, where Biller was homesteading in the Qu'Appelle Valley. Her commercial work virtually ceased at this point, but she continued to illustrate her life and surroundings in letters and sketchbooks. After her husband's death in World War I, Biller settled with her two children on James Island in 1919. In 1927, she moved to Victoria, where she was an active member of the Island Arts and Crafts Society founded by Josephine Crease.

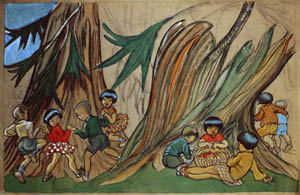
Japanese Kindergarten (between 1934 and 1939, Private Collection)

Relocating to Vancouver in 1934, she studied oil painting with Jock Macdonald, Fred Varley and life drawing with Tonshek Ustinov (1903–1990) at the British Columbia College of Art. This short-lived art school was formed in 1933 by artists disgruntled with the Vancouver School of Decorative and Applied Arts, forerunner of the Vancouver School of Art, now known as Emily Carr University of Art and Design. Biller's later work consists primarily of landscapes and genre scenes in an expressionist style, akin to but more lyrical than her contemporary Emily Carr. Other examples of her paintings and drawings are in the BC Archives, the Art Gallery of Greater Victoria, University College London and private collections in Canada and the UK.

== See also ==
- Canadian art
- List of Canadian artists
