= Prima Esposizione Internazionale d'Arte Decorativa Moderna =

1911 world's fair in Italy

1902 Turin
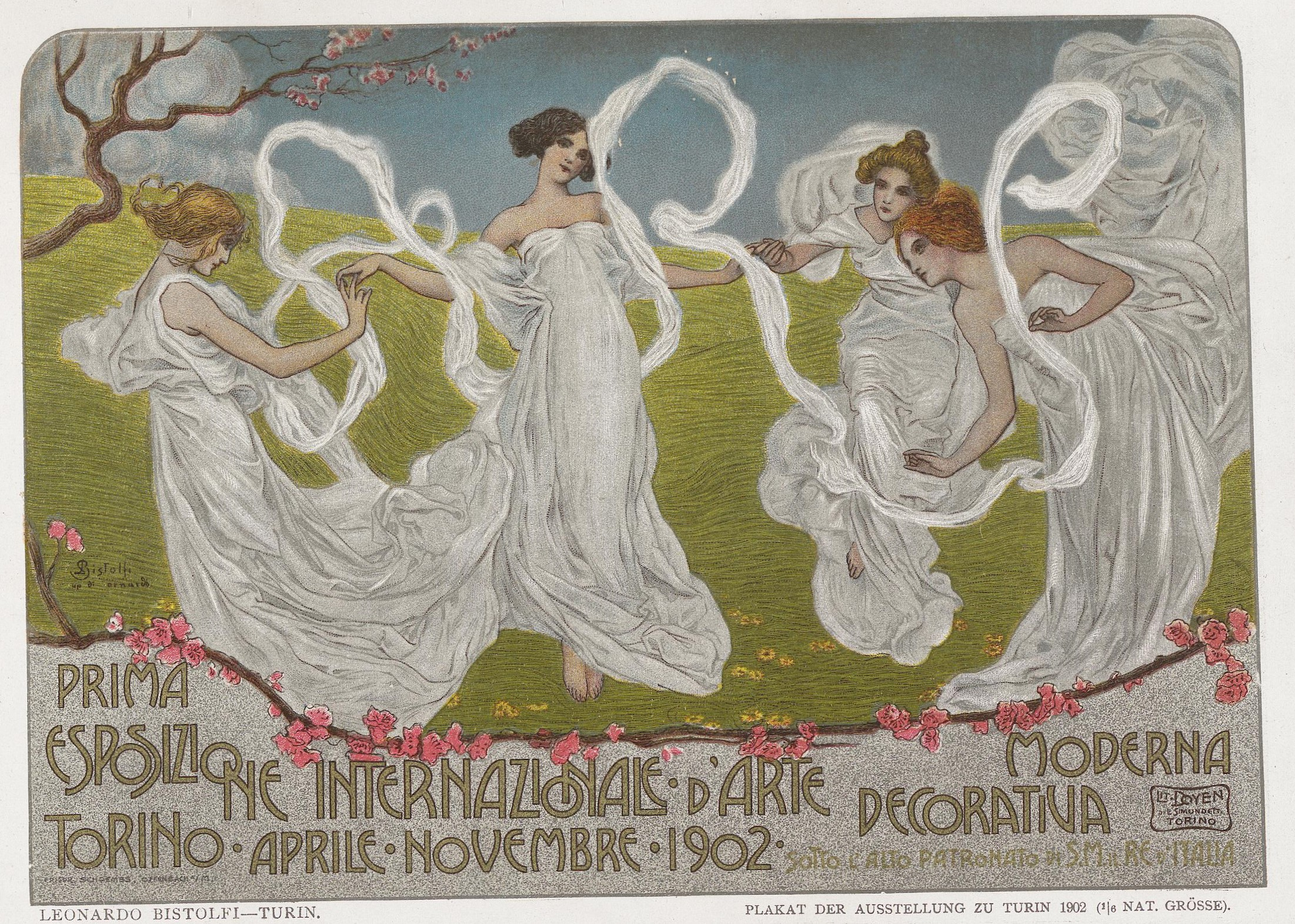
- Poster for the International Exposition of Modern Decorative Arts designed by Leonardo Bistolfi

Overview
- BIE-class: Universal exposition
- Category: Historical Expo
- Name: Prima Esposizione Internazionale d'Arte Decorativa Moderna

Location
- Country: Italy
- City: Turin
- Venue: Parco del Valentino
- Coordinates: 45°03′7.8″N 7°41′4.8″E

Timeline
- Opening: 10 May 1902
- Closure: 10 November 1907

Universal expositions
- Next: International Exhibition of Modern Decorative and Industrial Arts in Paris

The Prima Esposizione Internazionale d'Arte Decorativa Moderna (English: First International Exposition of Modern Decorative Arts), held in Turin, Italy in 1902 (opened 10 May), was a world arts exhibition that was important in spreading the popularity of Art Nouveau design, especially to Italy. Participating countries included Germany, Italy, Austria-Hungary, Switzerland, England, Belgium, the Netherlands, Japan, and the USA. Its aim was explicitly modern: "Only original products that show a decisive tendency toward aesthetic renewal of form will be admitted. Neither mere imitations of past styles nor industrial products not inspired by an artistic sense will be accepted." The Turin fair stands out as the only world fair dedicated exclusively to a single artistic style and marks the pinnacle of Art Nouveau.

== Concept ==
As a cultural and art-historical response to the 1900 Paris World's Fair, Turin continued the tradition of the Munich Secession exhibitions (1893 and 1897), the first exhibition of the Darmstadt Artists' Colony (1901), and the concurrent 14th Vienna Secession exhibition (1902) as a Gesamtkunstwerk (total work of art) in its architecture and exhibition concept.

Ernesto Balbo Bertone di Sambuy, Leonardo Bistolfi, Giovanni Antonio Reycend, and Enrico Thovez were responsible for the concept and direction of the fair. The chief architect was Raimondo D'Aronco who modelled his pavilions on those of Joseph Maria Olbrich in Darmstadt. As with the Turin International of 1911, the fair was held in the Parco del Valentino, where the exhibition buildings were newly constructed.

== Architecture ==
The internationally renowned Italian architect Raimondo D’Aronco (1857–1932) won the architectural competition for the new exhibition buildings in 1901. Other architects involved were Annibale Rigotti and Giovanni Vacchetta, while Enrico Bonelli oversaw the construction. Due to additional countries registering for the exhibition and the resulting greater need for exhibition space, the plans had to be modified repeatedly until the opening.

The most important element of the main building of the fair was the central rotunda (Rotonda d’onore), built in the neo-Baroque Art Nouveau style typical of D’Aronco and influenced by the dome of the Hagia Sophia in Istanbul. The exhibition galleries for Germany and Italy, as well as thematic pavilions focusing on photography, film, automobiles and fine arts, radiate out from the main building. The exhibition concept predates the first pavilion of the Venice Biennale, built in 1907.

== Artists and Works ==
The World's Fair helped many artists to achieve breakthrough success, including the blacksmith Alessandro Mazzucotelli, whose work gained public recognition and established his fame and success. Other highly successful Italian artists included the designer Carlo Bugatti and the furniture designers Vittorio Valabrega and Agostino Lauro. The exhibition brought together for the first time the leading figures of Art Nouveau, including Victor Horta, Peter Behrens, H. P. Berlage, Joseph Maria Olbrich, Charles Rennie Mackintosh and Louis Comfort Tiffany.

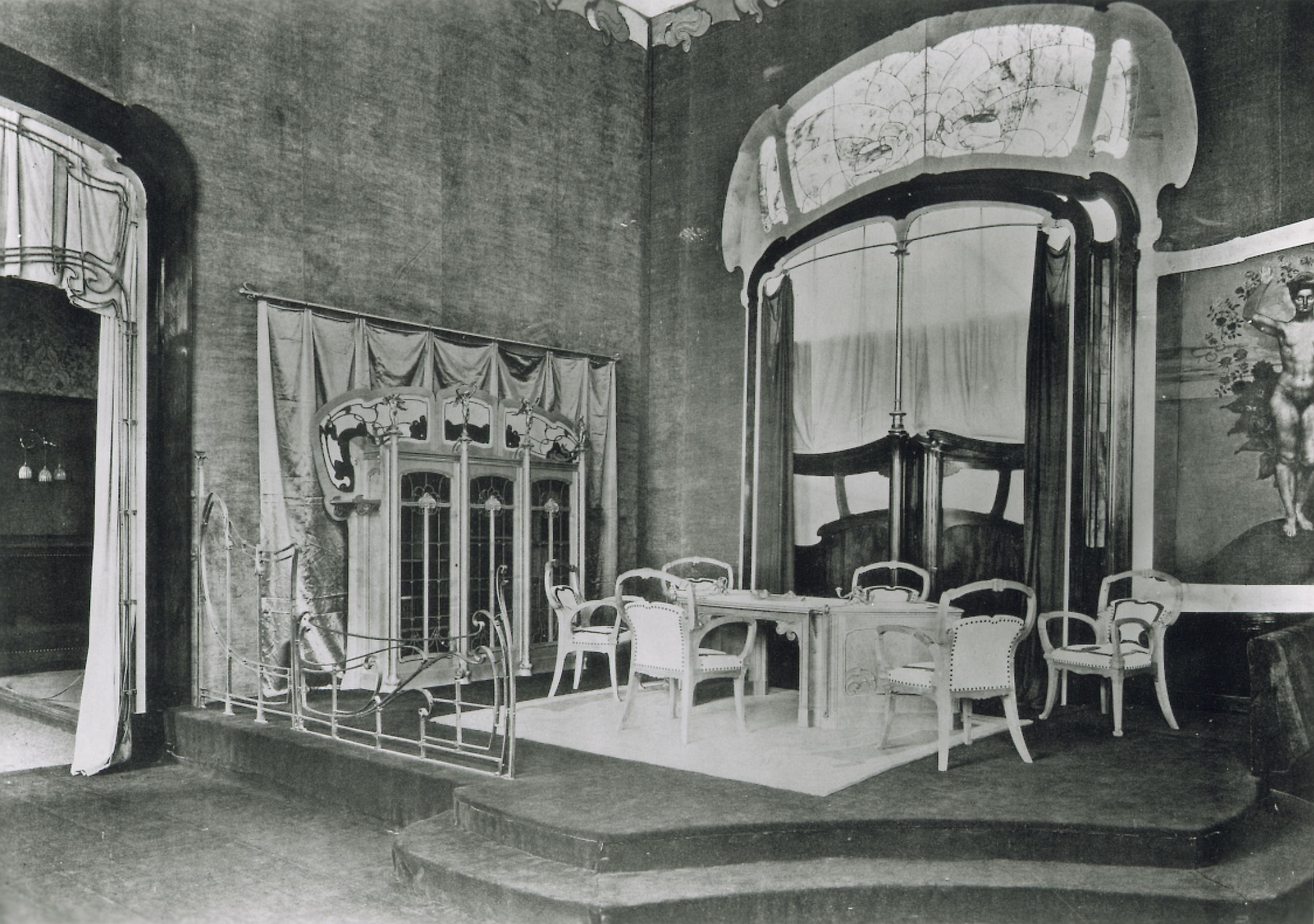
Art Nouveau furniture by Victor Horta displayed at Turin Exposition

Among the German artists who participated were the sculptor Wilhelm Krieger and Peter Behrens, who represented the Darmstadt Artists' Colony and was an important figure in the Art Nouveau movement. Numerous interiors were on display, including "A Lady's Writing Room" designed by Frances MacDonald and Herbert MacNair of the Glasgow School. Victor Horta represented Belgium with highly acclaimed furniture sets, including a dining room and office, earning a diploma of honour, the highest distinction. Horta was decorated with the Order of the Crown of Italy for his work. The Austrian painter and graphic artist Carl Otto Czeschka was awarded a gold medal, consolidating his reputation as one of the most influential designers of his generation.

== The Pavilions ==
=== Photography Pavilion ===
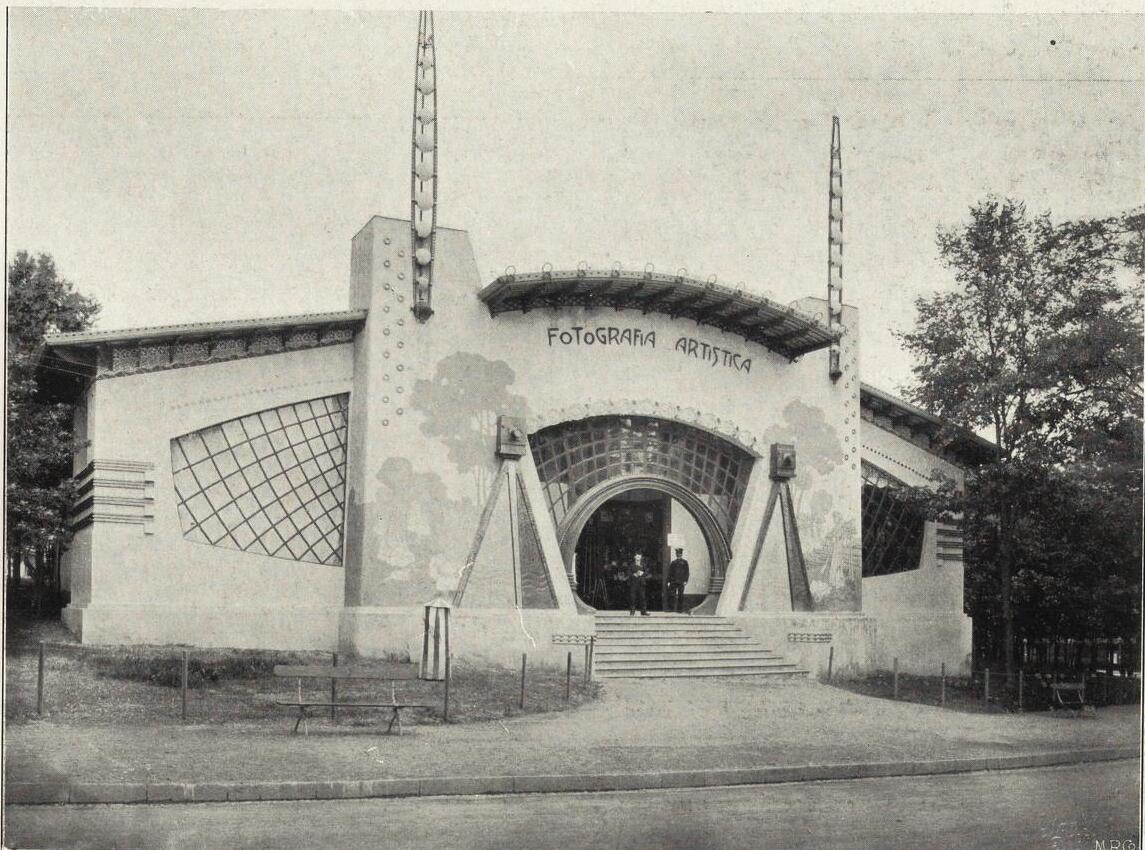
The Photography Pavilion with the characteristic round entrance

The 'International Exhibition of Art Photography' (Esposizione Internazionale di Fotografia Artistica), which took place in the Photography Pavilion (the Padiglione di Fotografia), occupied a special position. The building was flat and rectangular, while the entrance area had Art Nouveau features, including an almost round entrance that symbolised a camera lens. The inscription above the entrance read 'Fotografia Artistica'.

The American photographers of the Photo-Secession, led by Alfred Stieglitz and representing Pictorialism, were particularly concerned with establishing photography as an independent art form. Works submitted by the Photo-Secession — including artists such as Prescott Adams, Robert Demachy, Frank Eugene, Gertrude Käsebier, Joseph Keiley, Robert S. Redfield, Alfred Stieglitz, Edward Steichen and Clarence Hudson White — received the only Grand Prix awarded by King Victor Emmanuel III of Italy himself. This introduced American trends to a wider European audience, particularly through the subsequent establishment of the quarterly photographic journal Camera Work in 1903.

German art photographers Rudolf Dührkoop, Franz Grainer, and Nicola Perscheid participated in the exhibition. A second section focused on Vittorio Sella, who presented the genre of mountain photography.

== Subsequent Exhibitions ==
In 1911 To celebrate the 50th anniversary of the founding of the Kingdom of Italy, a series of exhibitions were held in Turin, Rome, and Florence. Rome hosted the International Exhibition of Art, while Florence featured an exhibition of Italian portraiture from the late 16th century to 1861. The 1911 Turin International (Esposizione Internazionale dell'Industria e del Lavoro) was dedicated to the theme of economy and labor.

The First International Exposition of Modern Decorative Arts was itself the subject of exhibitions marking its 90th anniversary. The Turin Civic Gallery of Modern and Contemporary Art held an exhibition entitled "Torino 1902" at the Palazzina delle Belle Arti until January 22, 1995. A comprehensive standard work on the exhibition was published in conjunction with it.

Another international exhibition of decorative arts had already been planned for Paris in 1914, but due to the outbreak of World War I, it was not held until 1925 under the name International Exhibition of Modern Decorative and Industrial Arts, which, from an art historical perspective, continued the Art Nouveau movement into Art Deco.

== Gallery ==
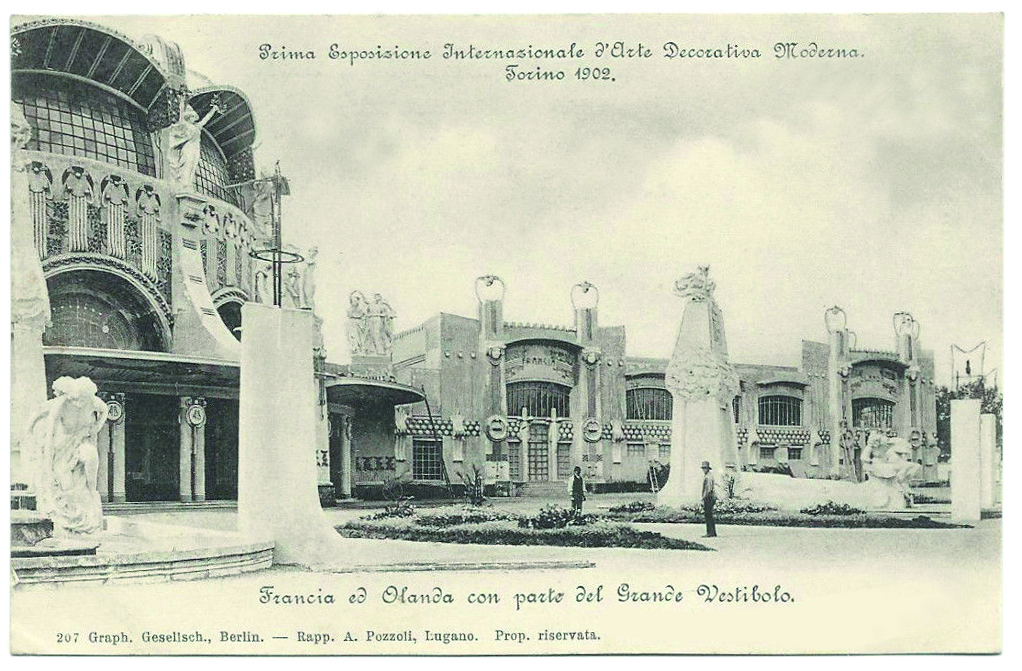
Entrance of the Exhibition

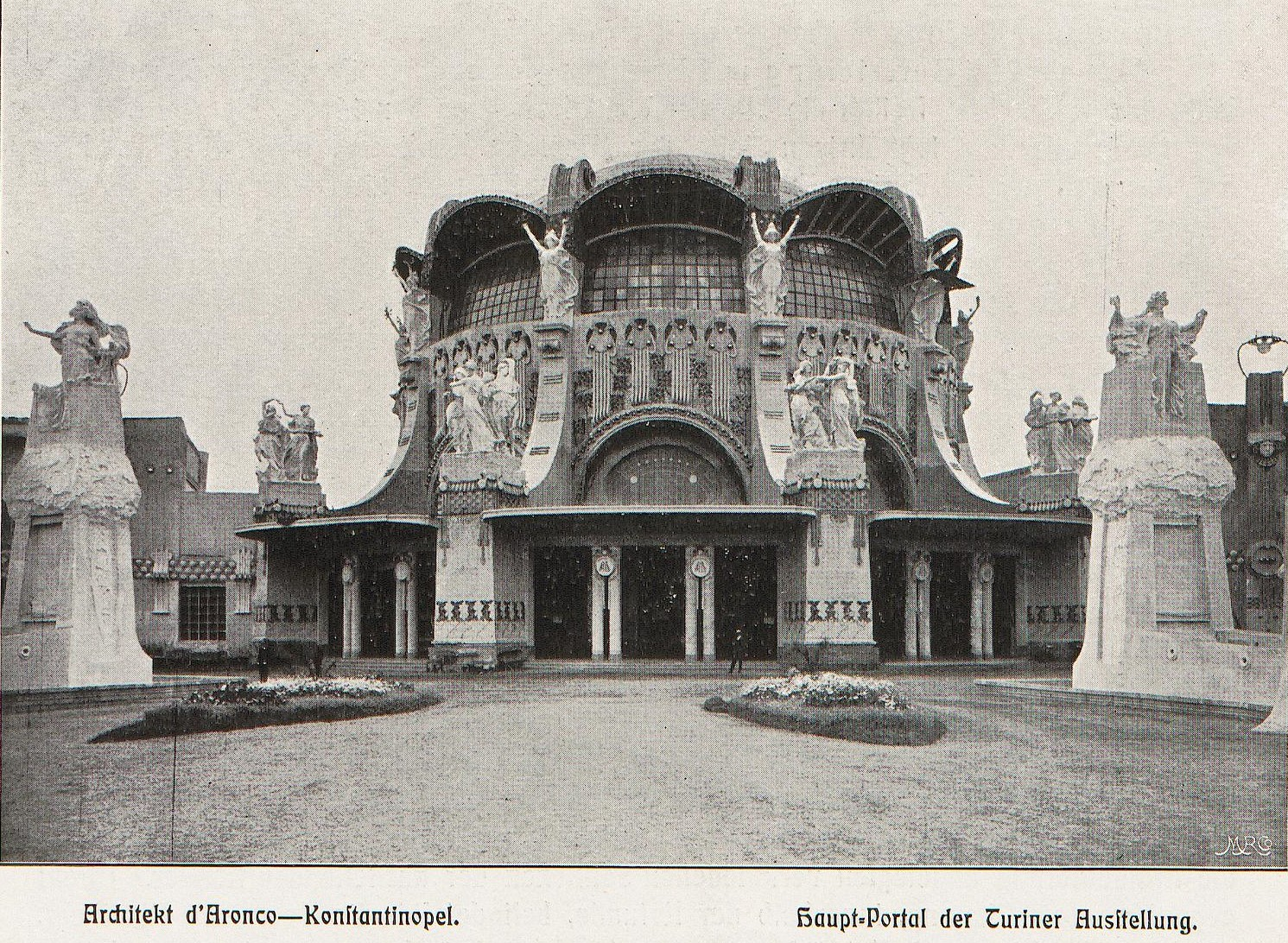
D’Aronco's rotunda

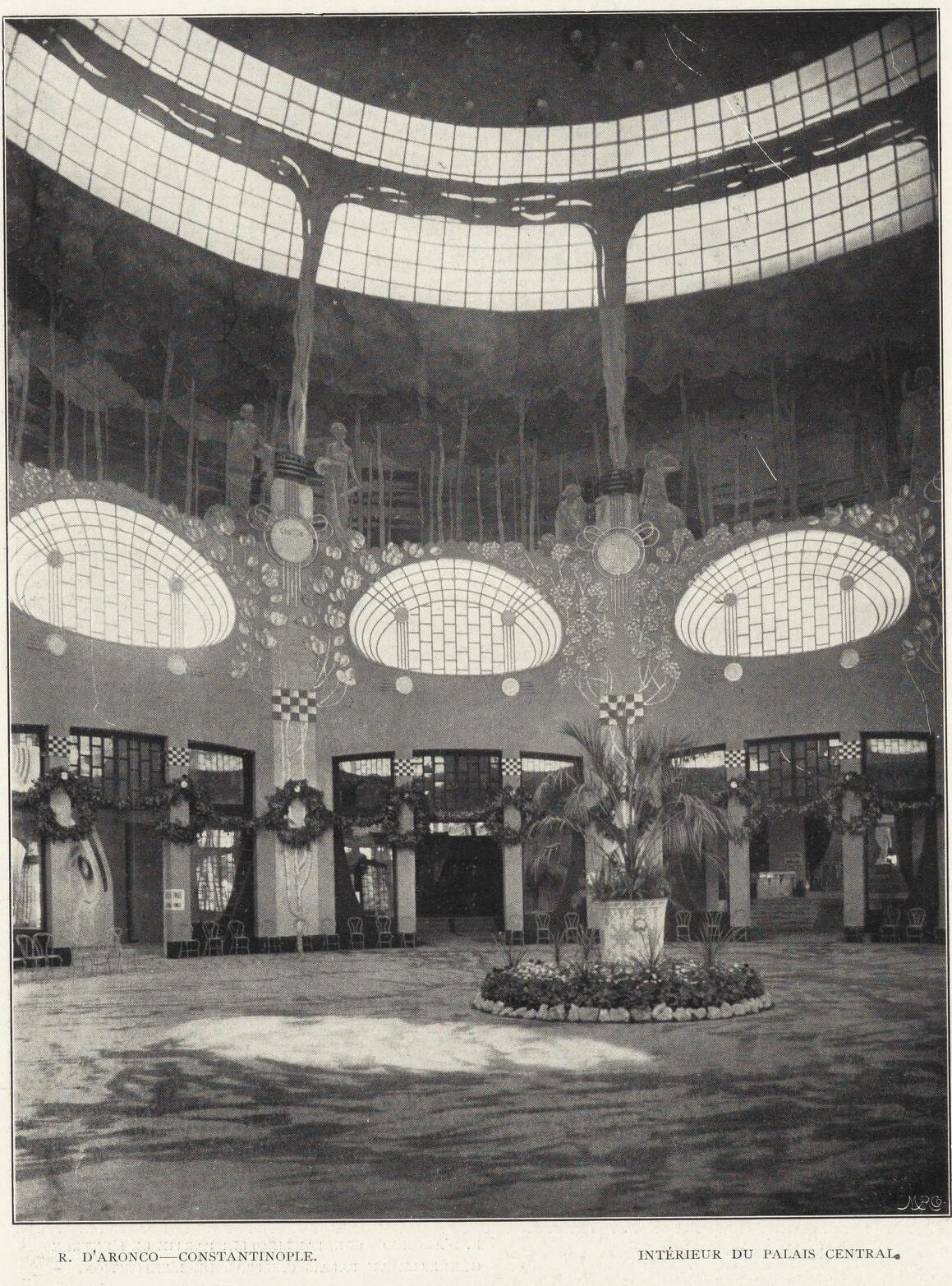
Interior of the rotunda

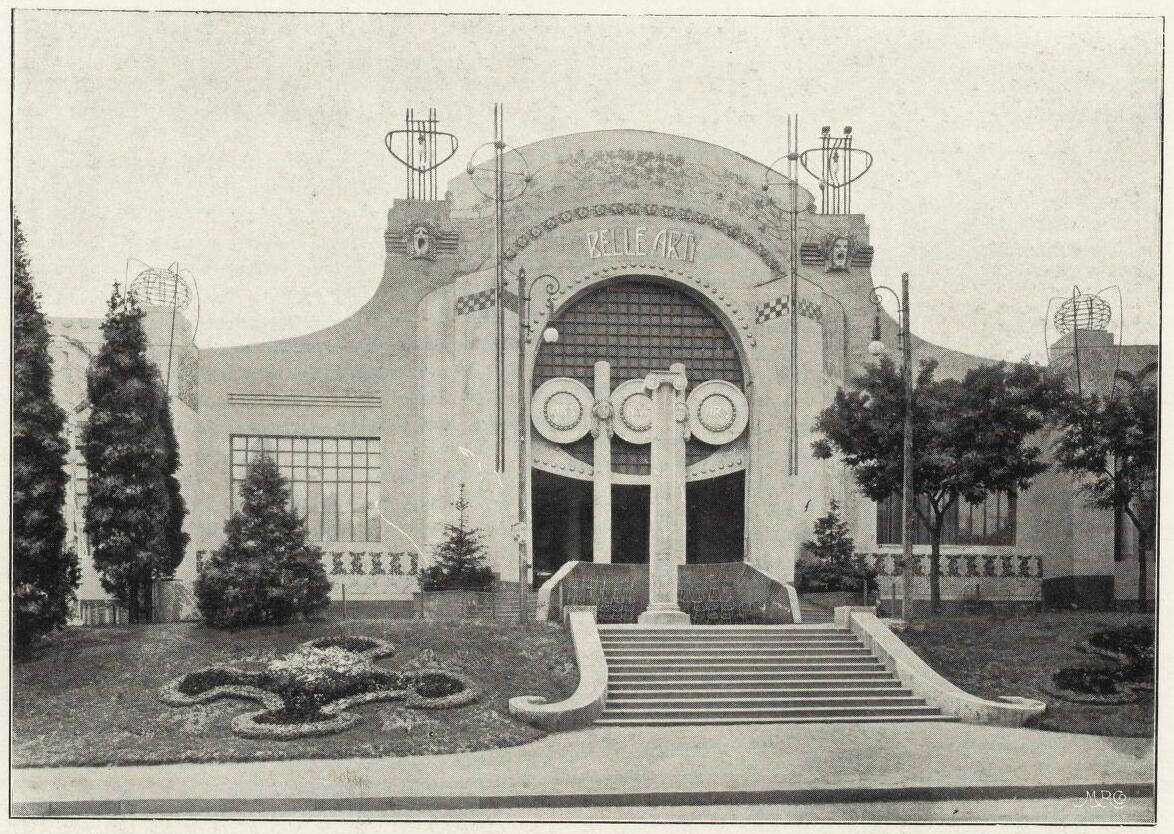
Entrance of the Palazzo di Belle Arti

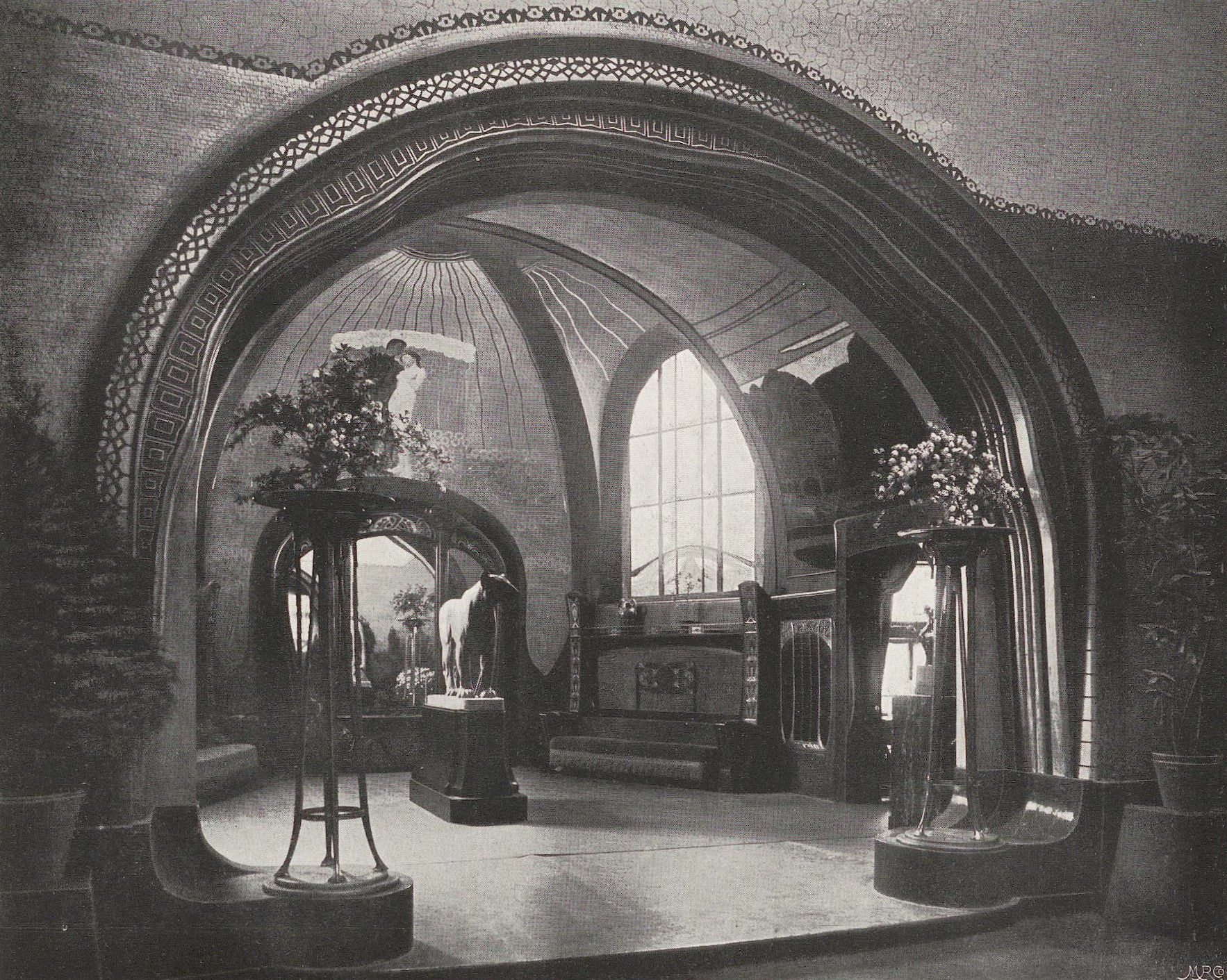
Interior of the Prussian pavillon, designed by Bruno Möhring

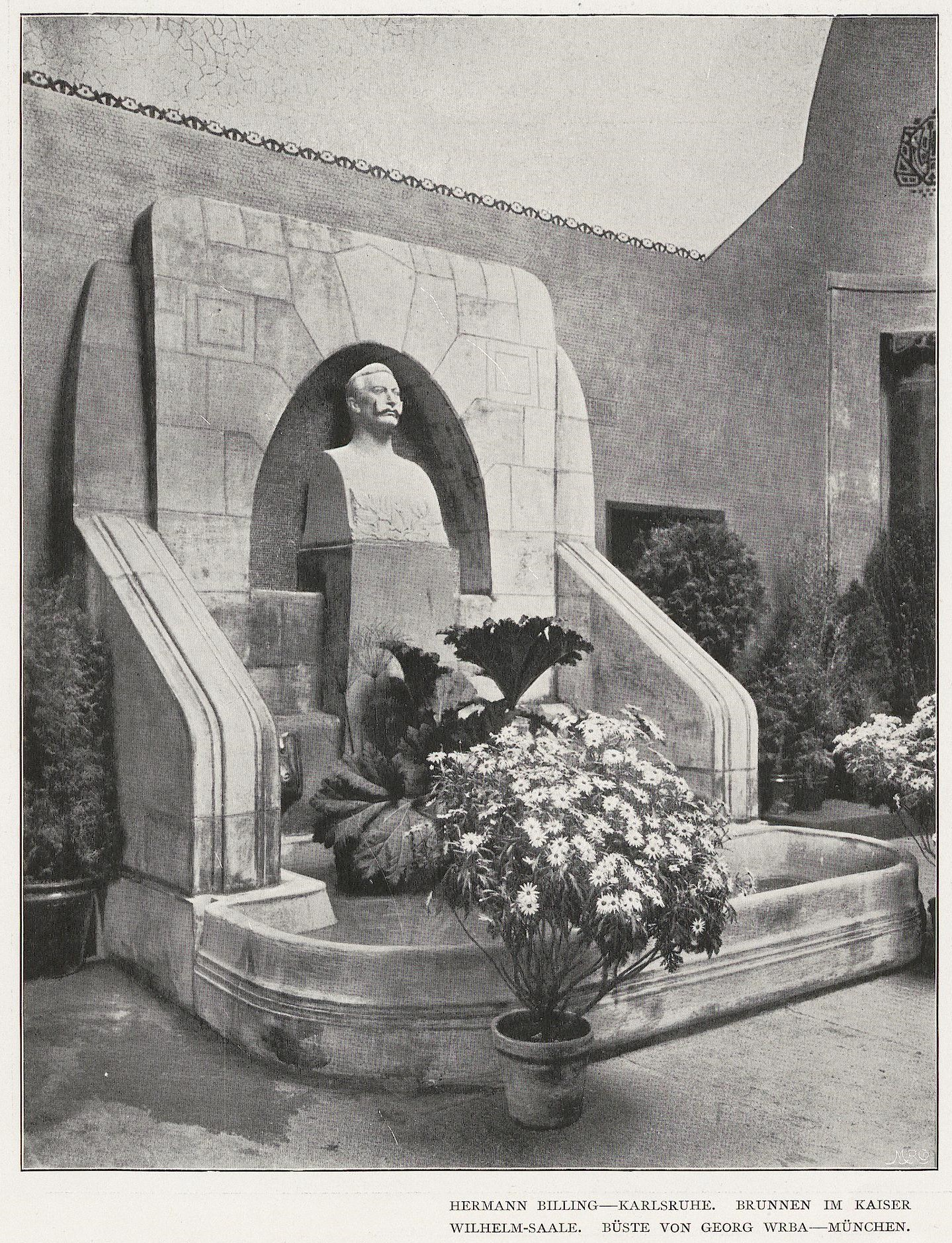
Hermann Billing, Fountain in the Kaiser Wilhelm Hall

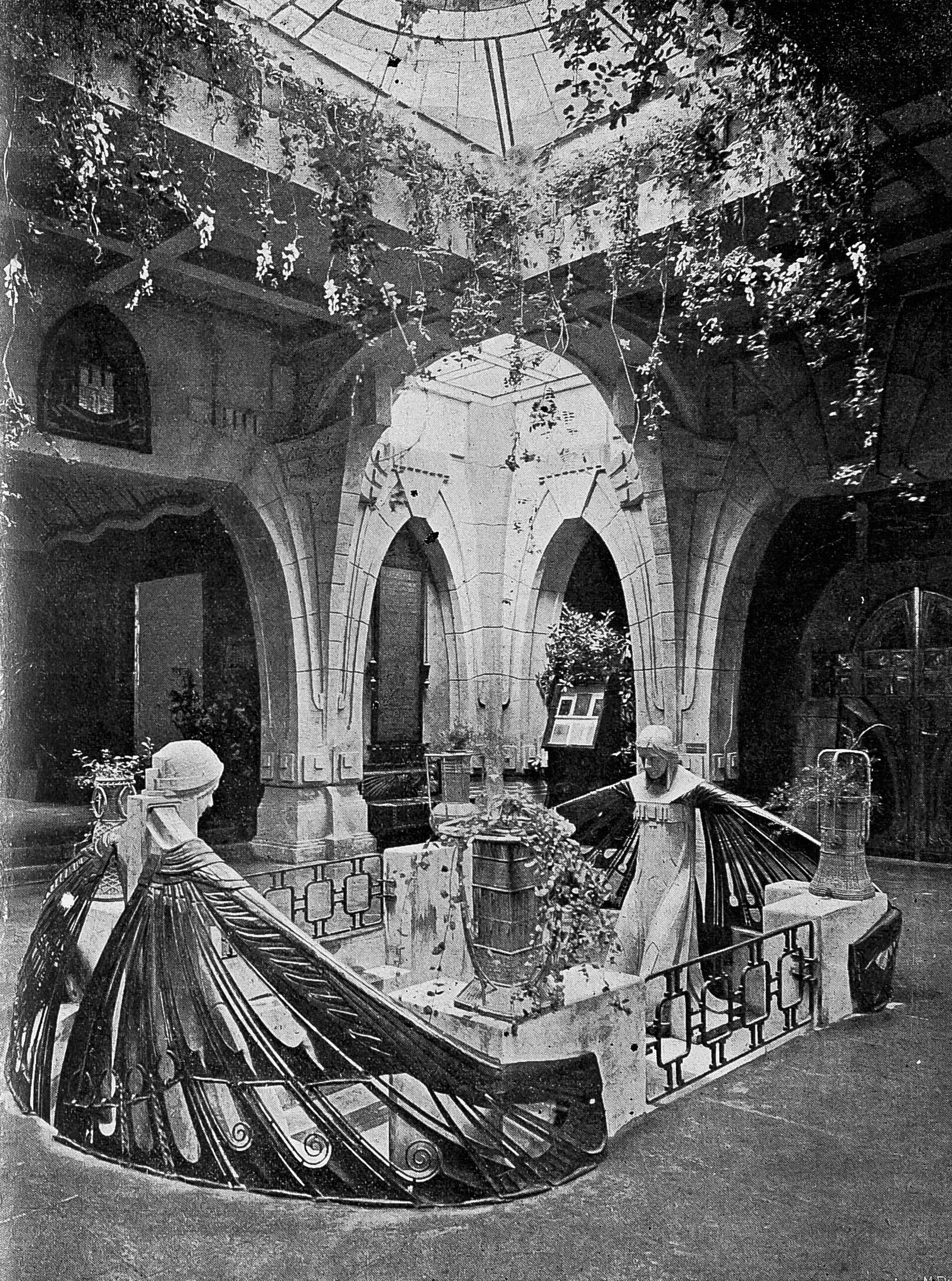
Vestibule of the maison de puissance et de beauté designed by Peter Behrens

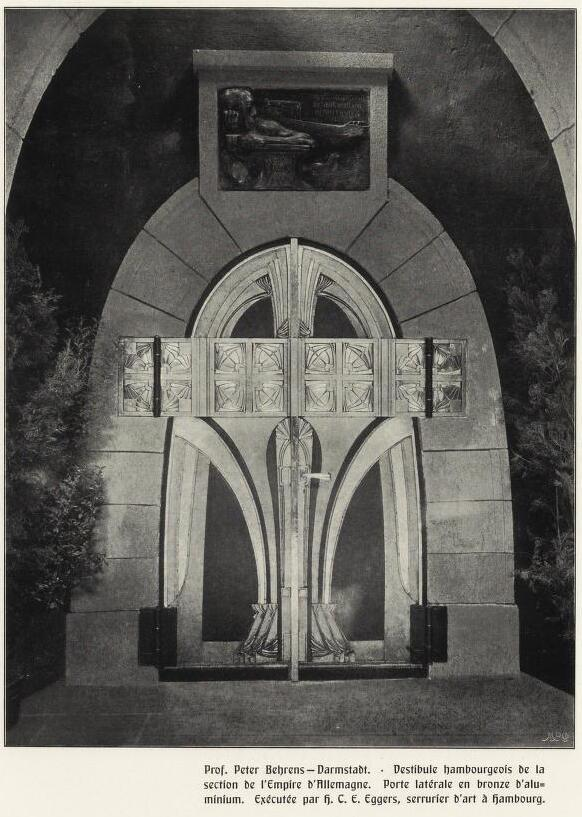
Vestibule Hambourgeois designed by Peter Behrens

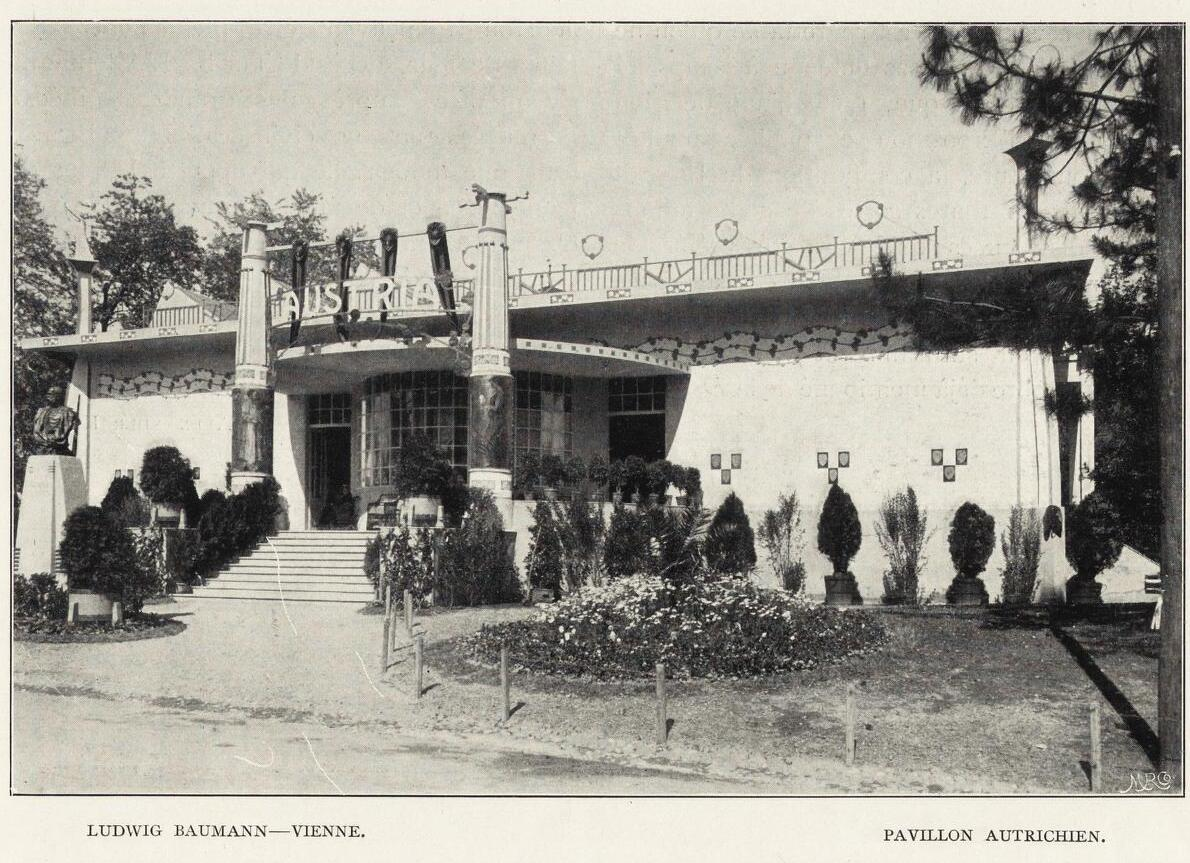
Austrian pavillon designed by Ludwig Baumann

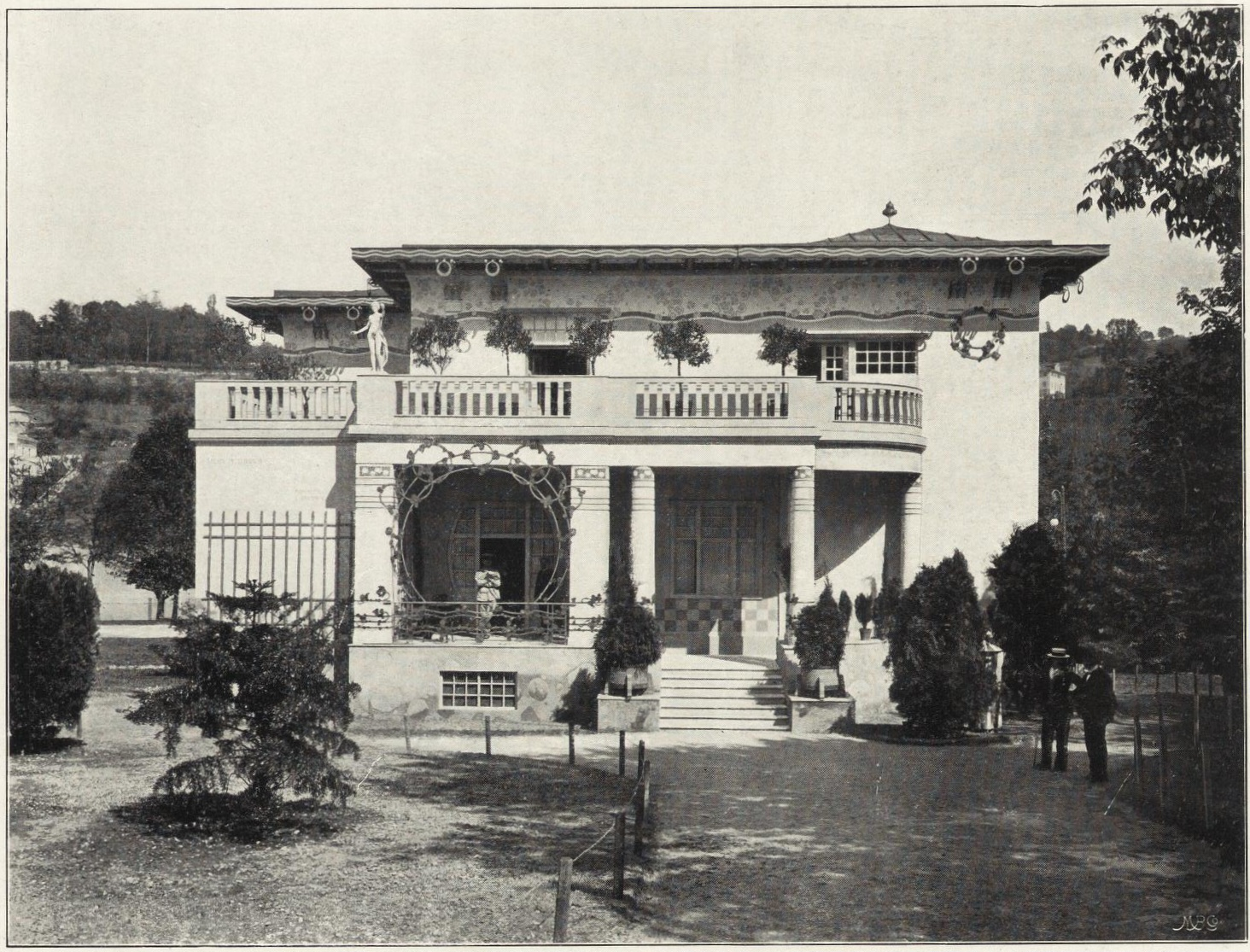
Maison Autrichienne designed by Ludwig Baumann

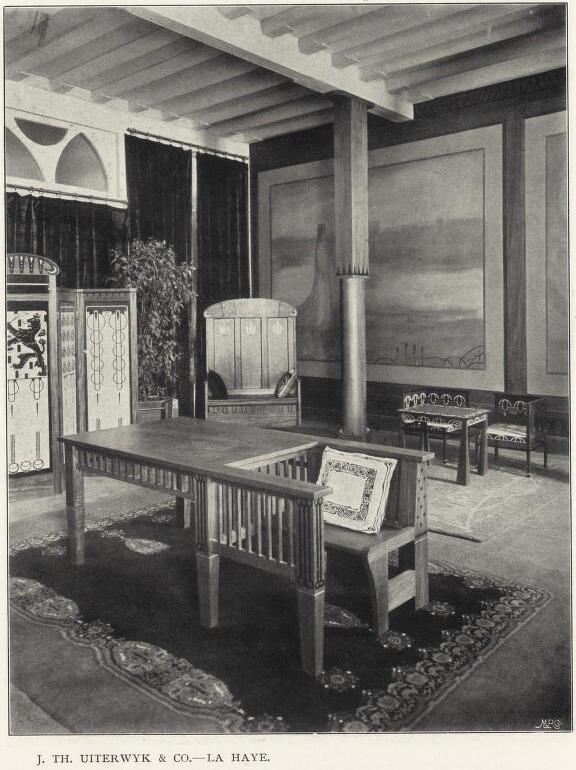
Interior of the Dutch pavillon

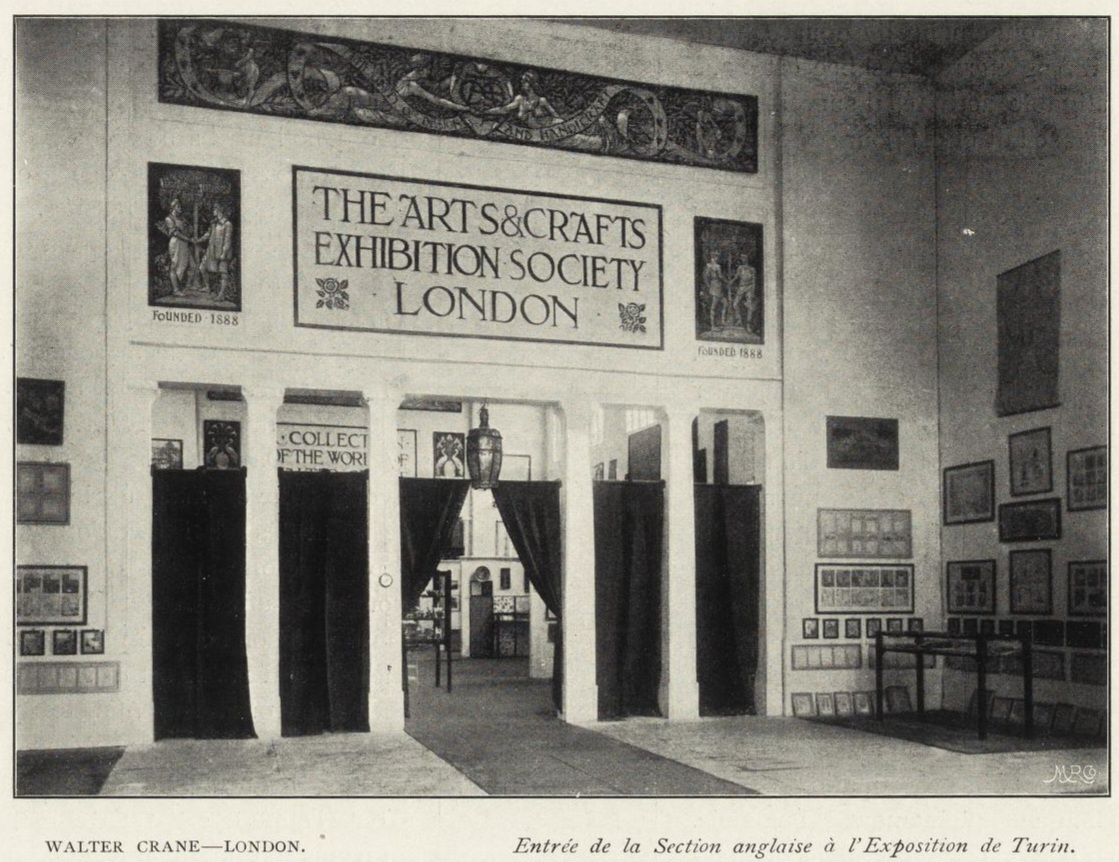
Entrance of the English section, designed by Walter Crane

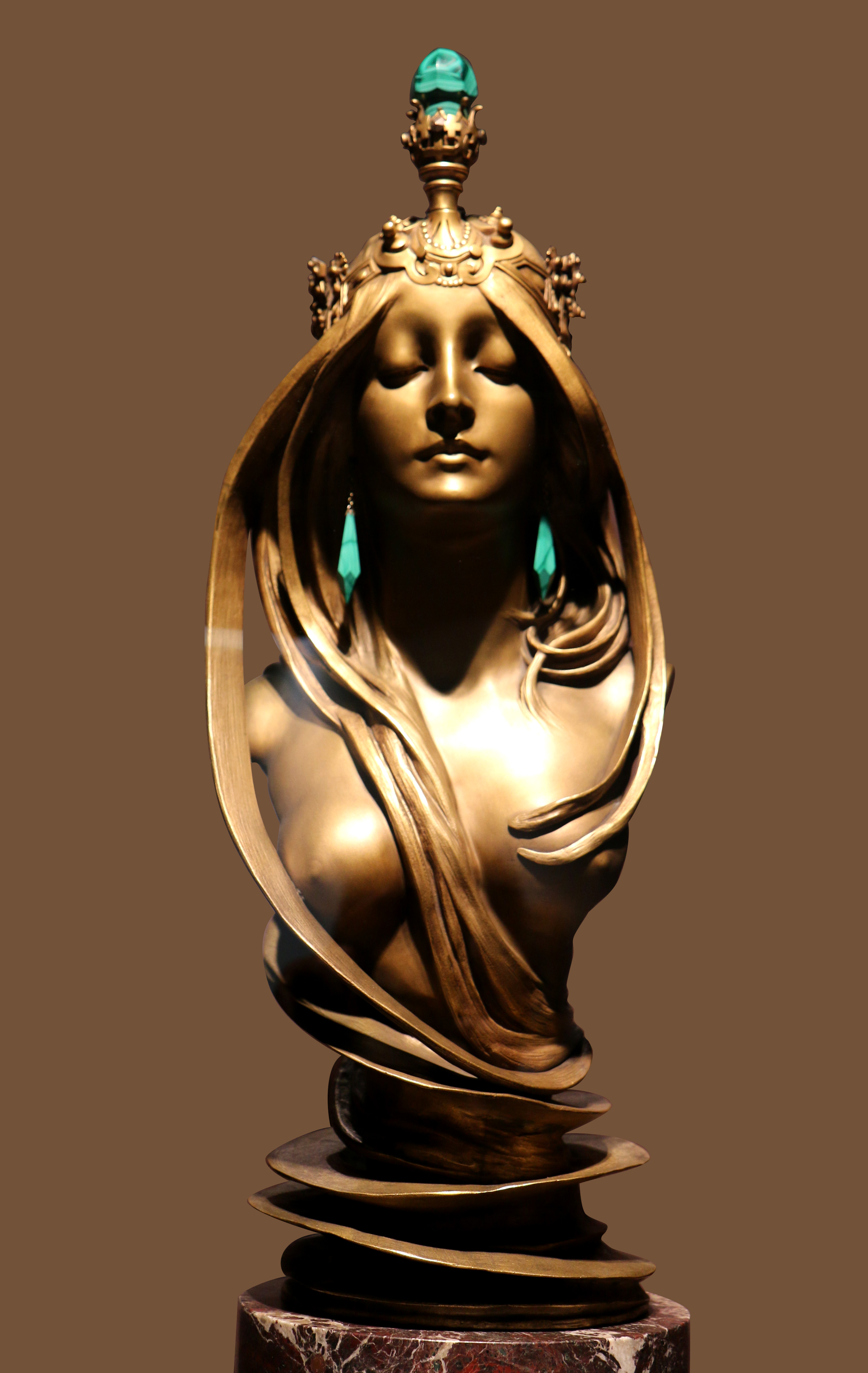
Nature by Alphonse Mucha, exhibited at the Prima Esposizione Internazionale d'Arte Decorativa Moderna

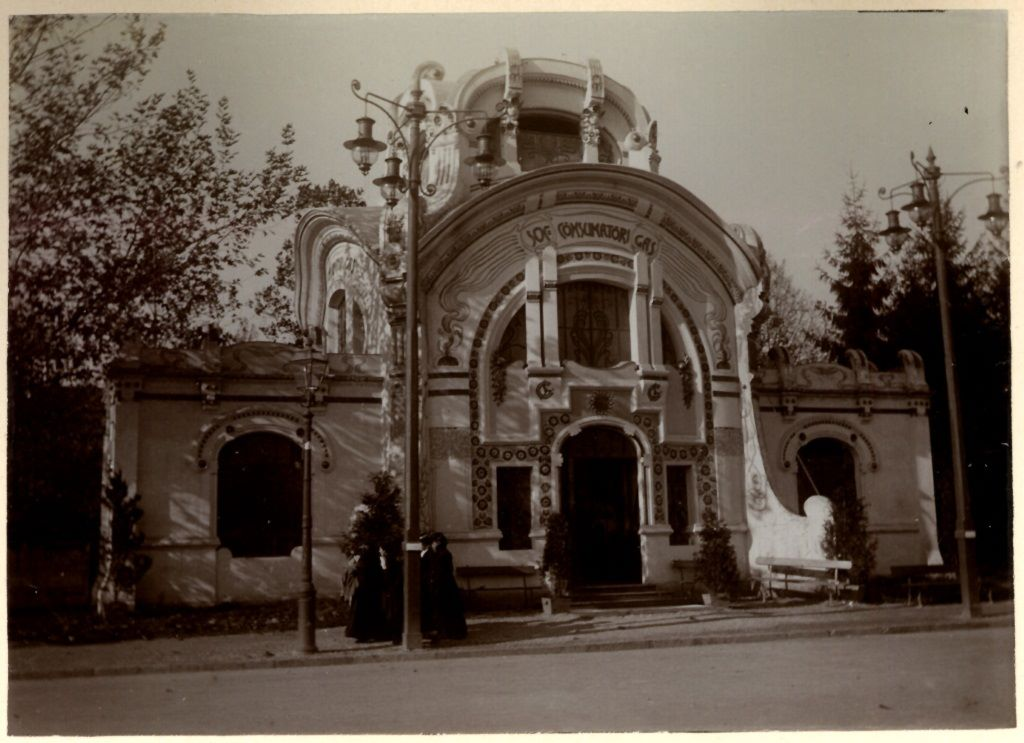
Pavillon of the Società Consumatori Gas

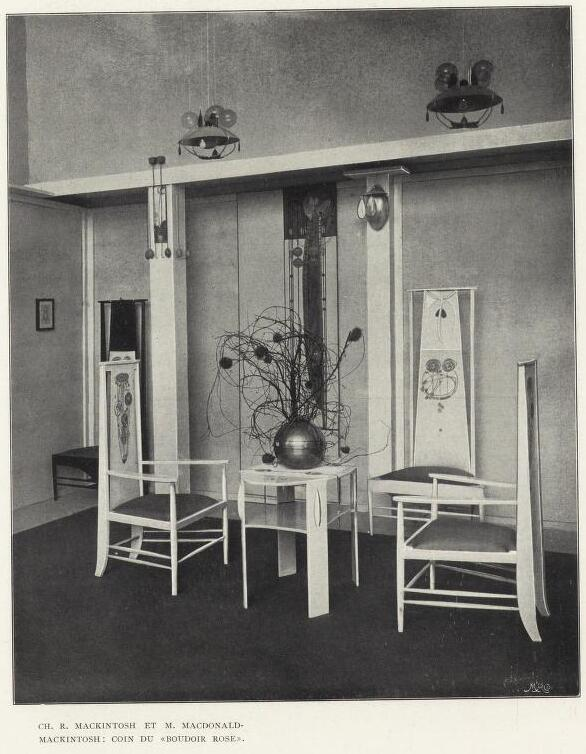
Boudoir rose designed by Charles Rennie Mackintosh and Margaret Macdonald

== See also ==
- Turin International (1911)
- Milan International (1906)
- Expo 61
- List of world's fairs
