= John Keppie =

Scottish architect and artist (1862–1945)

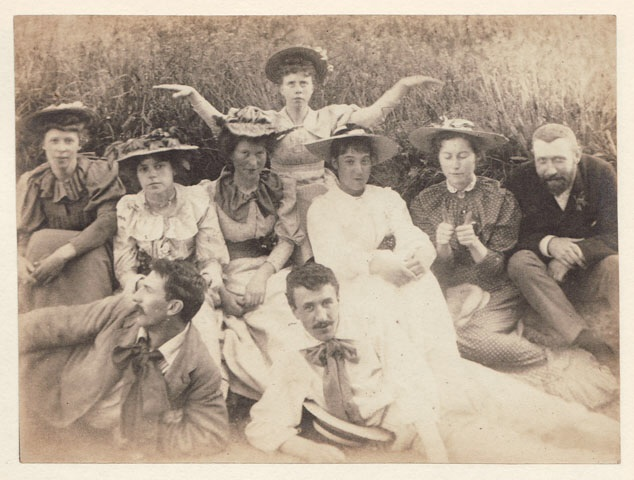
- The Immortals of Glasgow School of Art: At the back: Frances MacDonald middle row L-R: Margaret Macdonald, Katharine Cameron, Janet Aitken, Agnes Raeburn, Jessie Keppie, John Keppie front row L-R: Herbert McNair, Charles Rennie Mackintosh (circa 1894)
- Born: 4 August 1862; Glasgow, Scotland
- Died: 28 April 1945 (aged 76); Prestwick, Scotland
- Education: Glasgow School of Art
- Movement: Glasgow Style

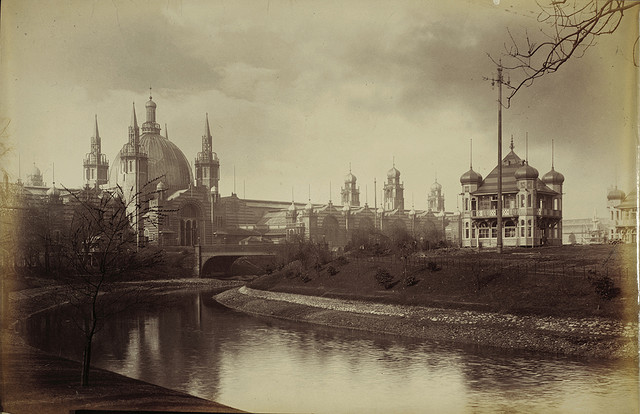
The Main Building at Glasgow International Exhibition of 1888, from the banks of the River Kelvin, design by James Sellars assisted by Keppie

John Keppie (4 August 1862 – 28 April 1945) was a Glasgow architect and artist. From an early age he was a close friend of Edward Atkinson Hornel and would often bring in New Year with him in Kirkcudbright. Within the architectural profession, he was closest to John Archibald Campbell, and is credited with training Charles Rennie Mackintosh.

== Biography ==
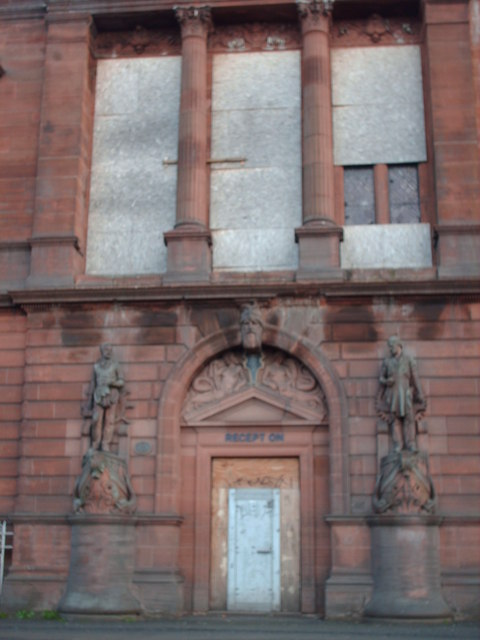
The imposing red sandstone offices of the Fairfield Shipbuilding and Engineering Company on Govan Road, which from 2013, will form the Fairfield Heritage Centre.

Keppie was born in Glasgow, the fourth son of John Keppie, a wealthy tobacco importer and Helen Cuthbertson Hopkins. Articled, in 1880, to Campbell Douglas and Sellars, he attended classes at both University of Glasgow and the Glasgow School of Art. Three of his siblings including Jessie Keppie also studied art. He also appears to have enrolled at the École des Beaux-Arts in 1885, remaining there until 1886. An accomplished draughtsman, he won silver medals in the Tite Prize competitions of 1886 and 1887. He assisted Sellars with the firm's winning entry for the Glasgow International Exhibition of 1888.

Following Sellars death in 1888, Keppie went into partnership with John Honeyman, establishing the firm Honeyman and Keppie. Mackintosh joined the firm in 1889 and from the 1890s Keppie appears to have been content to allow him to do most of the designing. It was whilst working for Honeyman and Keppie, who won the competition to design the new Art School building in 1896, that Mackintosh designed his greatest achievement. His design for Martyrs' Public School was also executed during this time (1895-1898).

Mackintosh was made partner in 1901, and Keppie returned to design, producing a series of Scots Renaissance buildings throughout Glasgow. He was admitted to the FRIBA in 1904. The partnership with Mackintosh dissolved in 1913. The following year the company won a major competition for the reconstruction of Glasgow Cross.

Keppie was elected to the Royal Scottish Academy in 1920, and continued to take an active role in professional matters, particularly as a governor of the Glasgow School of Art. He had been Deacon of the Incorporation of Wrights at the Trades House in 1906 and president of the Glasgow Institute of Architects in 1905, and again in 1919-20. He endowed the John Honeyman Studentships in architecture and in Sculpture in 1923, and did much to promote the career of Benno Schotz. He was president of the Royal Incorporation of Architects in Scotland in 1924-26; and as a Council Member of the RIBA he became its vice president in 1929. Keppie's long service as a governor of Glasgow School of Art ended in his chairmanship in 1930-32. He formally retired in 1937.

Keppie never married. He died at his home in Prestwick in 1945.

== Commissions ==
A full list of commissions can be accessed at John Keppie Dictionary of Scottish Architects.

- 1888 - Anderson's College of Medicine, "setting-up" commission from Douglas Campbell.
- 1889 - Fairfield Shipbuilding and Engineering Company offices, Govan (assisted by the young Charles Rennie Mackintosh). Built in the French Renaissance style.
- 1889 - expansion of Craigrownie parish church, Kilcreggan.
- 1890 - designed an Egyptian-style granite monument in honour of James Sellars at Lambhill cemetery, for whom he was assistant at the time.
- 1891 - Loretto School Chapel, Musselburgh.
- 1891 - extending nave of a church in Rhu.
- 1892 - remodelled hall and added gallery to Glasgow Art Club.
- 1893 - remodelling of Glasgow Herald building (Attributed to Mackintosh).
- 1894 - refurbishment of St Michael's Parish Church, Linlithgow.
- 1895 - medical building for Isabella Elder's Queen Margaret College
- 1903 - 137-43 Hope Street.
- 1905 - McConnel's Building,
- 1906 - 307-33 Hope Street. for the Glasgow City Improvement Trust.
- 1908 - Glasgow Savings Bank, Parkhead.
- 1910 - Gallery at Broughton House, Kirkcudbright.
- 1927 - Glasgow Trades Hall refurbishment.
- 1934 - Croftwood Parish Church

== Gallery ==
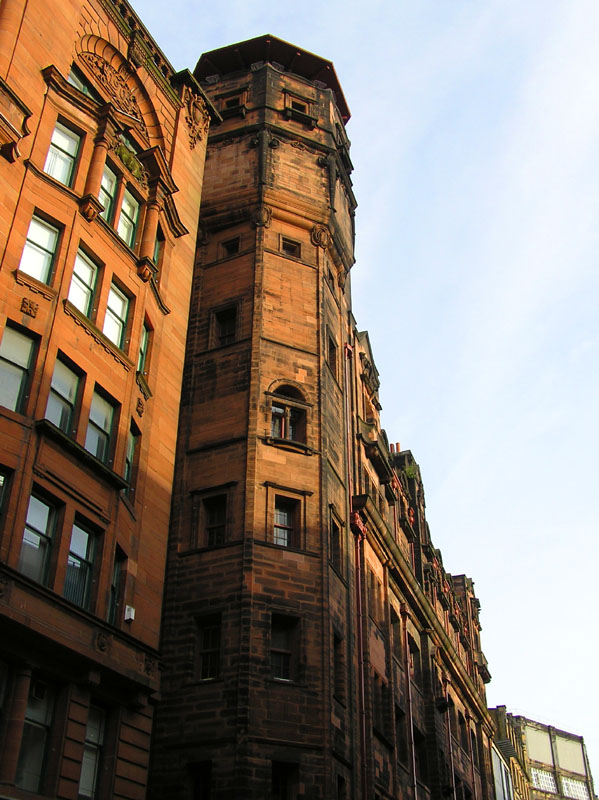
"The Lighthouse", Glasgow Herald building (1893)

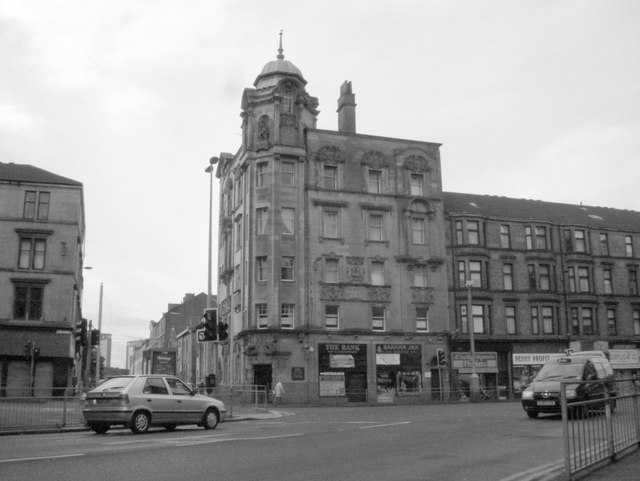
Glasgow Savings Bank, Parkhead
