= Jessie Newbery =

Scottish artist (1864–1948)

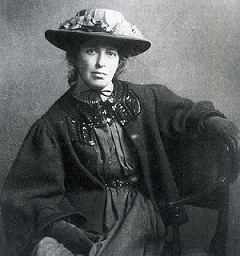
- Born: Jessie Wylie Rowat; 28 May 1864; Paisley
- Died: 27 April 1948 (aged 83); Dorset
- Education: Glasgow School of Art
- Known for: Decorative Arts, Design
- Movement: Art Nouveau, Glasgow Style, Symbolism
- Spouse: Francis Newbery

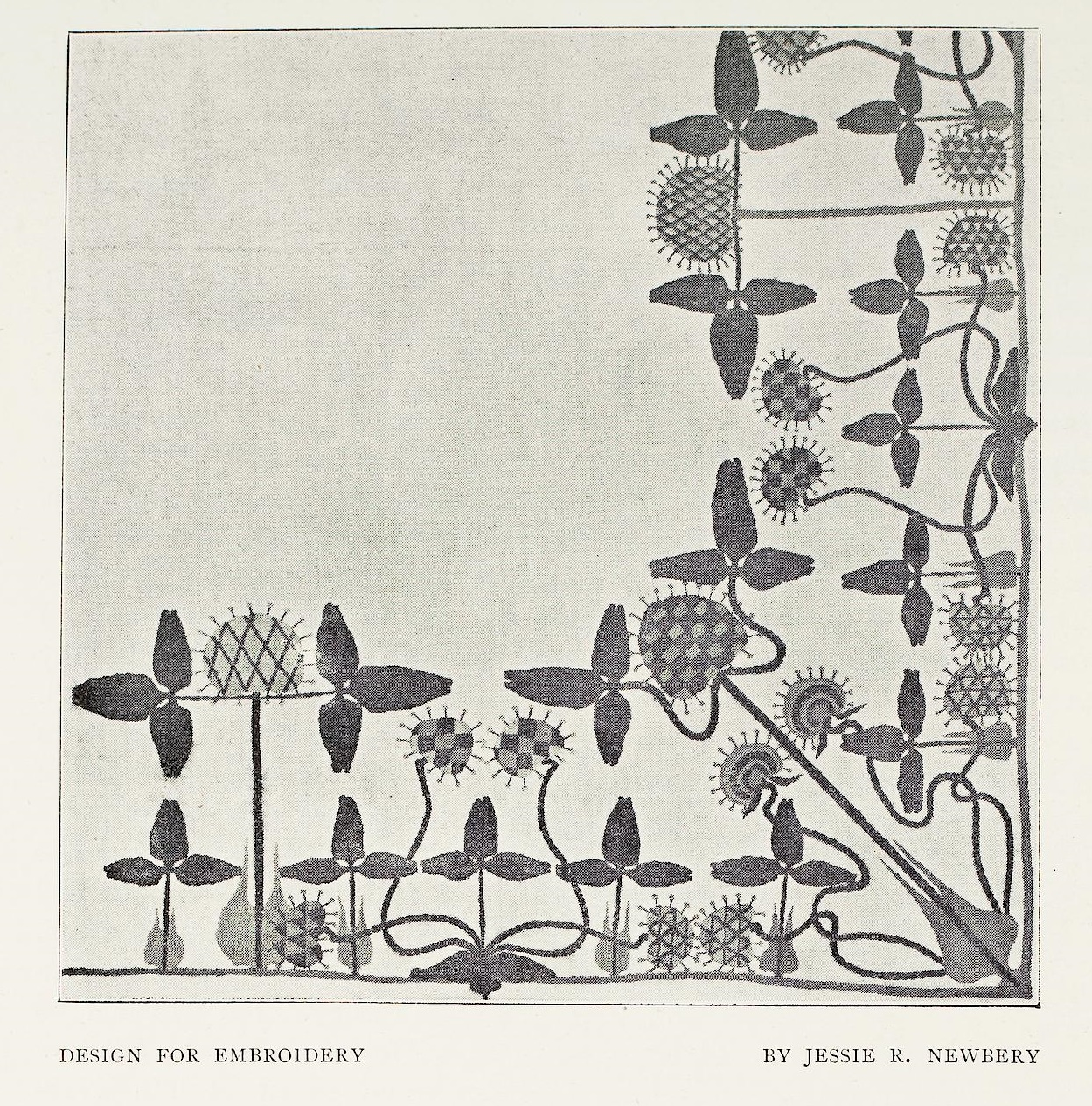
Image published in The Studio vol 12 (1898)

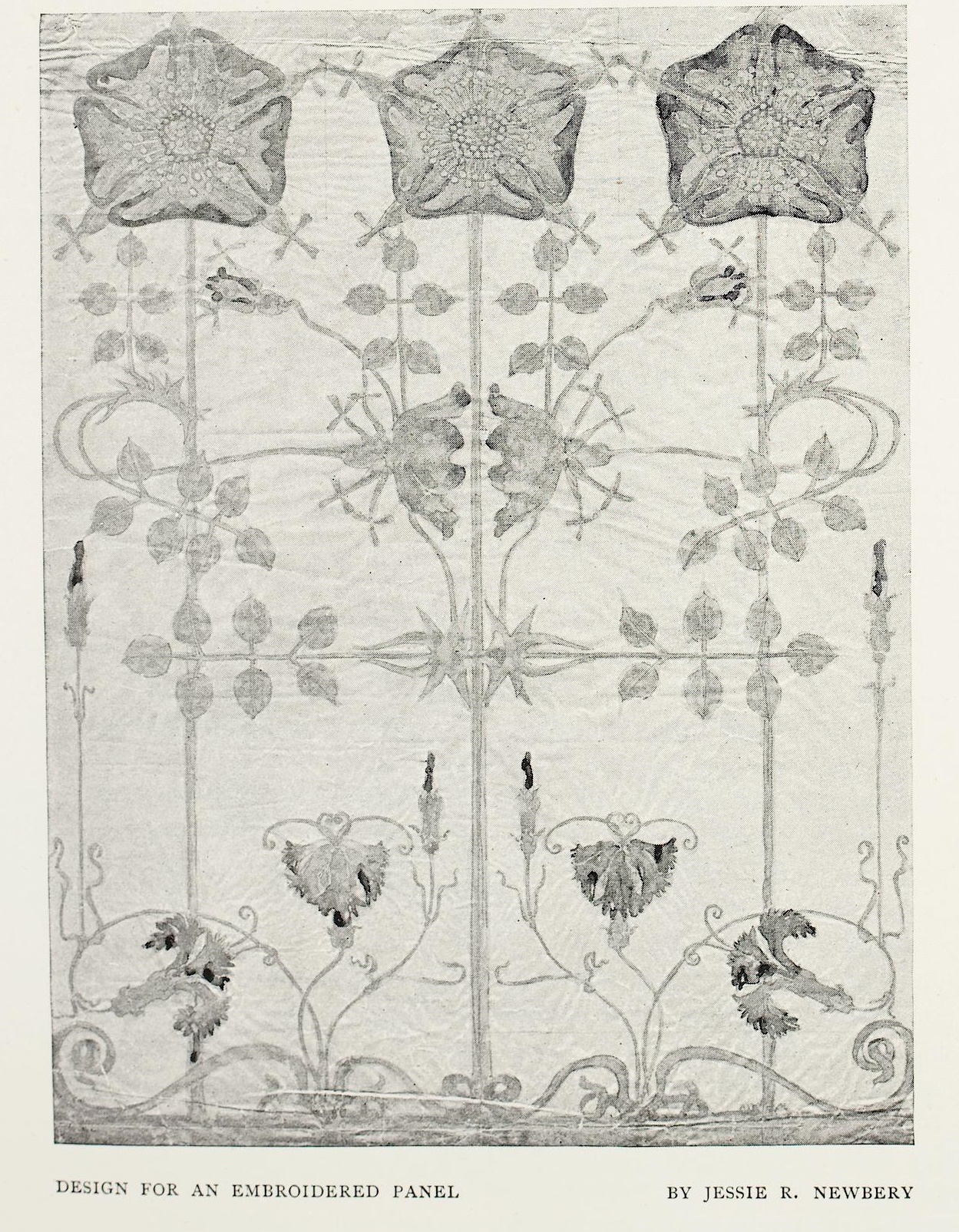
Design for an embroidered panel by Jessie Newbery. The Studio vol 12 (1898)

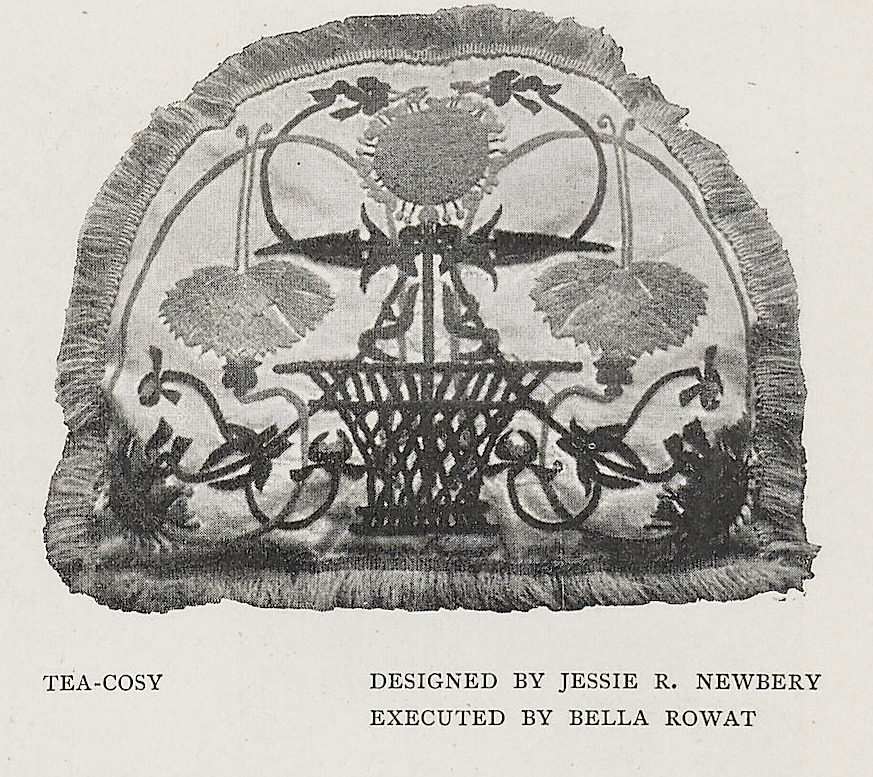
Tea Cosy designed by Jessie Newbery and Bella Rowat from The Studio vol 15 (1899)

Jessie Newbery (28 May 1864 – 27 April 1948) was a Scottish artist and embroiderer. She was one of the artists known as the Glasgow Girls. Newbery also created the Department of Embroidery at the Glasgow School of Art where she was able to establish needlework as a form of unique artistic design. She married the director of the Glasgow School of Art, Francis Newbery, in 1889.

== Early life and education ==
Born Jessie Wylie Rowat in Paisley, she was the daughter of Margaret Downie Hill and William Rowat, a forward-thinking shawl manufacturer. A visit to Italy when Newbery was aged 18 stimulated a lifelong interest in textiles and other decorative arts. She enrolled as a student at the Glasgow School of Art in 1884.

== Work and career ==
Sensim Sed cushion cover of embroidered linen with silks, designed and embroidered by Jessie Newbery ca 1900. The stitches emphasise the simple structure of the design. The colours, texture, lettering and stylised rose is characteristic of the Glasgow School. The cushion cover is inscribed with a Latin poem that remarks upon the passage of time and encourages daily work.

Newbery became an accomplished and original embroideress, though embroidery was not formally taught at the Glasgow School of Art. The profile of embroidery was raised at the school through the work of the "Four" – Charles Rennie Mackintosh, Herbert McNair, Frances Macdonald and Margaret Macdonald Mackintosh – who all designed embroidery as part of their decorative schemes. Newbery started the first needlework and embroidery class at the school in 1894. Newbery was noticed for embroidery designs that were quite different from the output of the Royal School of Art Needlework. Her works had a hint of seventeenth-century crewel-work and her designs featured floral forms with angular stems and a strong decorative quality. She is credited as the inventor of the angular Glasgow rose, which has been likened to a cabbage. She also imported the new Glasgow style lettering into her embroidery designs.

Students who took part on her embroidery classes did so as an extra subject, or because they hoped to earn a livelihood as professional embroidery workers. At the turn of the century the Scottish Education Department issued guidance which envisaged embroidery as an important part of the national school curriculum. Hence women teachers attended Newbery's classes as part of their teaching qualification. Newbery was considered an "enthusiastic teacher and encouraged a strong sense of design in her pupils' work." She opened the doors to women students with a generous admission policy and a reformed curriculum. Keen to promote embroidery as a form of art for all levels in society and for men and women, Newbery established an Embroidery Department and Saturday classes, attended by over 100 women, at the Glasgow School of Art.

Newbery was careful in her choice of colour and materials. She preferred to use a lighter palette than was traditional, focusing on light purples, greens, blues and pink. She also encouraged the use of "unusual techniques such as needle weaving" and included additions like beads, ribbons and card as well as contrasting hemming, Newbery felt that design, in addition to utility, was important in her work. Her approach to design was egalitarian: "I believe that nothing is common or unclean: that the design and decoration of a pepper pot is as important in its degree, as the conception of a cathedral." She got noted for her "materialism, her commitment to socialism and her contribution to community." And her approach was commended in The Studio magazine, for its innovation and taking everyday things and "seeks to make them beautiful as well as useful".

Newbery incorporated elements of the emerging Glasgow Style in her design works and in turn shaped the decorative style of the movement. Together with her husband she promoted a range "novel genres", such as metalwork, glasswork, pottery and woodcarving, at the Glasgow School of Art. The Glasgow Boys had emerged as the pioneers of a revolt against the Scottish artistic establishment and its grip on institutions. In this spirit Jessie and Francis Newbery established the Glasgow Girls as a group that embraced a range of genres and placed arts and crafts on an equal footing with other works of art.

She taught dress design alongside embroidery. She thought clothing should be practical and took an interest in rational dress, while also believing that clothes should be beautiful. This approach to women's clothing was considered "avant-garde" and "radical". Newbery first experimented with a "Renaissance flavor" in her own clothing, often choosing looser styles, materials such as silk velvets and lightweight wools which she embroidered herself. Additionally, she held classes in mosaics, from 1896 to 1898, in enamels from 1895 to 1899, and also in book decoration in 1899.

== Support for women's suffrage ==
Newbery was an active member of the Glasgow Society of Lady Artists. Along with sponsoring many friends and students for membership, she also provided exhibition and studio space for women artists. She was keen for women to have more of a place in society, and was an active member of the Women's Social and Political Union, organising the "Arts and Curios" stall at the Grand Suffrage Bazaar held at St Andrews Halls, Glasgow in 1910. She helped to make materials for related movements, such as the suffrage banners, along with Ann Macbeth, including one with embroidered signatures of 80 force-fed Holloway prisoners, which was in the mass suffragette procession from 'Prison to Citizenship' in London, 1911.

== Later life ==
After an illness Newbery retired in 1908 as Head of Embroidery at the Glasgow School of Art and was succeeded by Ann Macbeth, a former student of hers who had been her assistant since 1901.

Newbery did continue to create her own work and showed her embroidery in exhibitions, including one at the Louvre, Paris. In 1911 she took part in the planning for the Scottish Exhibition of National History, Art and Industry, on the committee of the Decorative and Fine Arts Section.

Newbery died in Corfe Castle, Dorset, where she and her husband, Francis Newbery, had gone to live after retirement.

== See also ==
- List of Scottish women artists
- Appliqué
- The Glasgow Girls
- Victorian dress reform
