= Herbert MacNair =

Scottish artist (1868–1955)

James Herbert MacNair
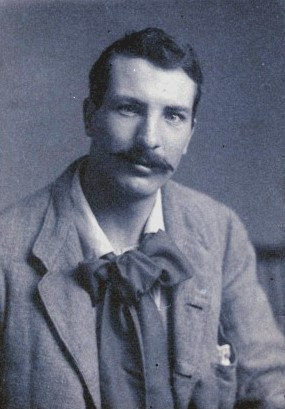
- Born: 23 December 1868; Glasgow, Scotland
- Died: 22 April 1955 (aged 86); Innellan, Scotland
- Education: Glasgow School of Art
- Known for: Architecture, Art, Design, Decorative Arts
- Movement: Art Nouveau, Glasgow School, Symbolism, Arts and Crafts
- Spouse: Frances MacDonald (m. 1899)

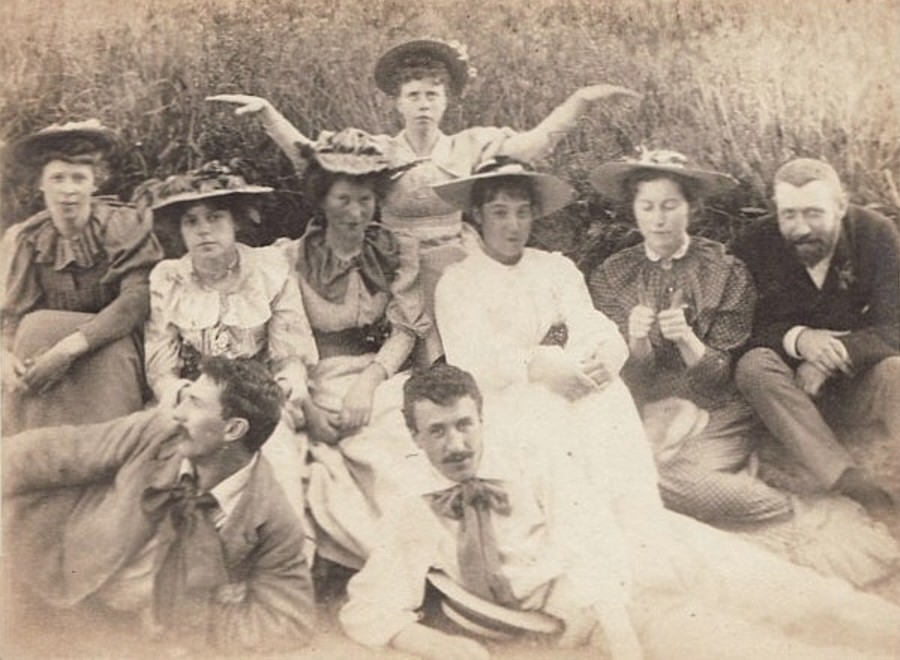
The Immortals at Glasgow School of Art (Back Row: Margaret MacDonald. Middle Row L-R: Frances MacDonald, Katharine Cameron, Janet Aitken, Agnes Raeburn, Jessie Keppie and her brother John Keppie. Front Row L-R: Herbert MacNair and Charles Rennie Mackintosh.

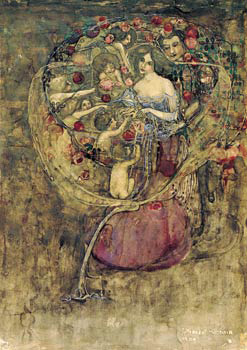
The Gift of Doves, 1904.

James Herbert "Bertie" MacNair, also spelt as McNair (23 December 1868 – 22 April 1955), was a Scottish artist, designer and teacher whose work contributed to the development of the Modern Style (British Art Nouveau style) during the 1890s. He formed the Glasgow-based artist group The Four together with his wife, Frances MacDonald, and his in-laws; Margaret MacDonald and Charles Rennie Mackintosh.

== Early life ==
Born in Glasgow into a military family, MacNair started his art training with one year of studying painting in Rouen, France. Afterwards he was trained as an architect with the Glasgow firm of Honeyman & Keppie from 1888 to 1895, and it was there that he first met Charles Rennie Mackintosh. As part of their training, the two attended evening classes at the Glasgow School of Art between 1888-1894 and 1895-96, where they met the MacDonald sisters, Margaret and Frances. MacNair would go on to marry Frances in 1899, and Mackintosh would marry Margaret in 1900.

== The Four ==
All four later became the loose collective of the Glasgow School known as "The Four", MacNair being the least well known. Influenced by the Arts and Crafts movement, and other European movements such as Symbolism and Art Nouveau, they pioneered the Glasgow Style. MacNair set up his own studio at 225 West George Street, Glasgow, in 1895, where he worked as a designer producing furniture, book illustrations, water colours and posters. MacNair’s artistic merits have often been compared unfavourably to those of Mackintosh, but he had significant influence as a teacher following his move to Liverpool in 1898 and appointment as Instructor in Design at the School of Architecture and Applied Art.

In 1899 Frances MacDonald joined MacNair in Liverpool and the two married. The couple painted watercolours and designed interiors, exhibiting a Writing Room at the International Exhibition of Modern Art in Turin in 1902. They also exhibited in Liverpool, London, Vienna and Dresden in the early 1900s. Following closure of the School in 1905, and the loss of the MacNair family wealth through business failure, the couple returned to Glasgow in 1909. MacNair’s career went into decline from this period, and no design works of his are known beyond 1911.

== Later life ==
In 1913 MacNair was working in Canada, in a chocolate factory and later a railway company. He returned to Glasgow where he worked as a postman and as a manager in a garage. After the death of his wife in 1921, MacNair destroyed all of their works that he had in his possession. He then moved to an old people's home, where he lived until his death in 1955.
