= Frances MacDonald =

Scottish artist (1873–1921)

Frances Macdonald
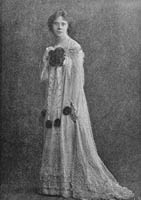
- Born: 24 August 1873; Kidsgrove, England
- Died: 12 December 1921 (aged 48); Glasgow, Scotland
- Movement: Arts and Crafts movement
- Spouse: Herbert MacNair (m. 1899)
- Children: Sylvan McNair (son)
- Relatives: Margaret MacDonald Mackintosh (sister)

Frances Macdonald MacNair (24 August 1873 – 12 December 1921) was a Scottish artist whose design work was a prominent feature of the Modern Style (British Art Nouveau style) during the 1890s.

== Biography ==
Frances Macdonald MacNair was the sister of Margaret Macdonald Mackintosh, another renowned artist and designer. She was born in Kidsgrove, England and the family moved to Glasgow in 1890. Both sisters enrolled in painting classes at the Glasgow School of Art in 1891, where they met the young artists Charles Rennie Mackintosh and Herbert MacNair. In 1899, Frances married the artist James Herbert MacNair, while Margaret married fellow artist Charles Rennie Mackintosh the following year. The four artists remained close, and their work often overlapped and influenced each other. After they met, they exhibited together in a 'School of Art Club' exhibition and due to their similar stylistic approaches came to be referred to as "The Four".

In the mid-1890s, the sisters left the School to set up an independent studio together. They collaborated on graphics, textile designs, book illustrations and metalwork. Frances also produced a wide variety of other artistic work, including embroidery, metalwork panels and watercolour paintings. The sisters exhibited in London, Liverpool and Venice.

In 1899, she married MacNair and joined him in Liverpool where he was teaching at the School of Architecture and Applied Art. The couple painted watercolours and designed interiors, exhibiting a Writing Room at the International Exhibition of Modern Art in Turin, and Frances began teaching. They also designed the interiors of their own home at 54 Oxford Street. In the early 1900s, they also exhibited in Liverpool, London, Paris, Venice, Vienna and Dresden. The closure of the School in 1905, and the loss of the MacNair family wealth through a business failure, led to a slow decline in their careers, and they returned to Glasgow in 1909. In the years that followed, Frances painted a series of symbolist watercolours addressing the choices facing women, such as marriage and motherhood. Frances and Herbert had a son, Sylvan, born in June 1900 and who later emigrated to Rhodesia.

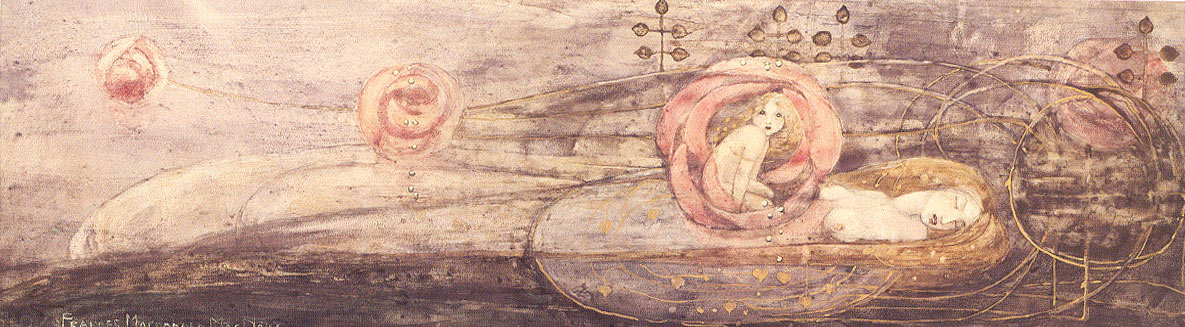
Sleeping Princess, 1909.

Frances' achievements are less well known than those of her sister, due in part to her departure from Glasgow, but also because her husband destroyed many of her works after her death. Both sisters works were also frequently overshadowed by the achievements of Charles Rennie Mackintosh. Frances died in Glasgow in 1921.

Much of her work that remains is held by the Hunterian Museum and Art Gallery, and in the Walker Art Gallery in Liverpool.

== Style ==
Frances Macdonald frequently worked with her sister, developing a distinctive style influenced by mysticism, symbolism, Christianity, and Celtic imagery. In context with secular stylistic choices, the works are believed to be commentaries and representations of the New Woman.

Scholars note Macdonald's depictions of women as divorced from common archetypes of the time, such as the femme fatale. Subjects in her work are depicted naked or almost naked, with elements such as greenish skin or angular elongated form. During her life, critics frequently dismissed her work as too decorative. However, feminist readings of her works support her usage of style.

Like her sister, she was influenced by the work of William Blake and Aubrey Beardsley and this reflected in her use of elongated figures and linear elements.

== Gallery ==
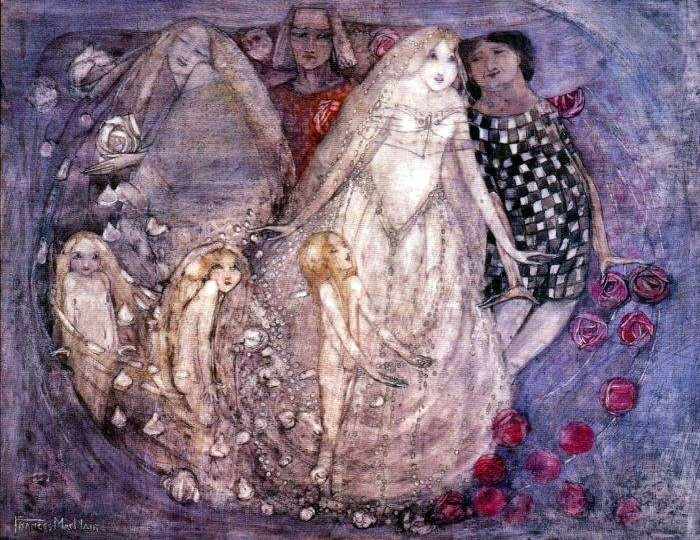
A Paradox, 1905.

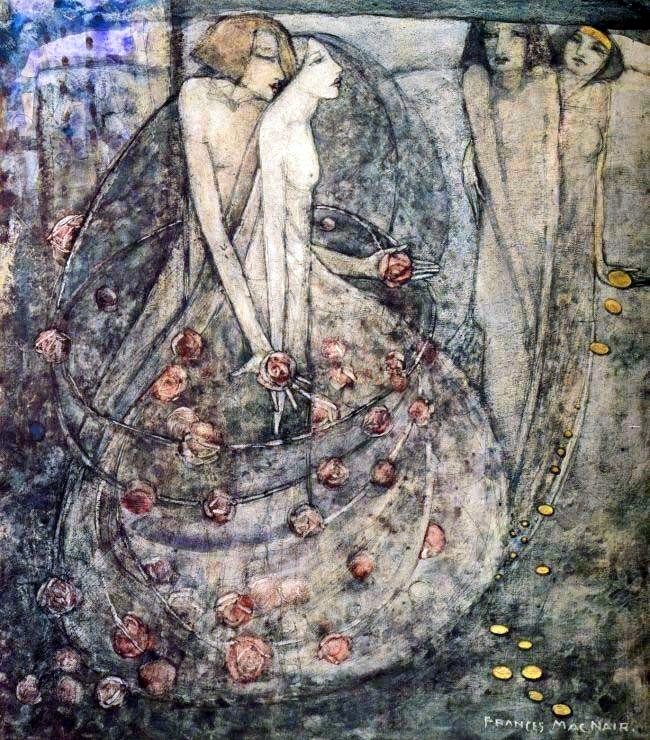
The Choice, 1909.

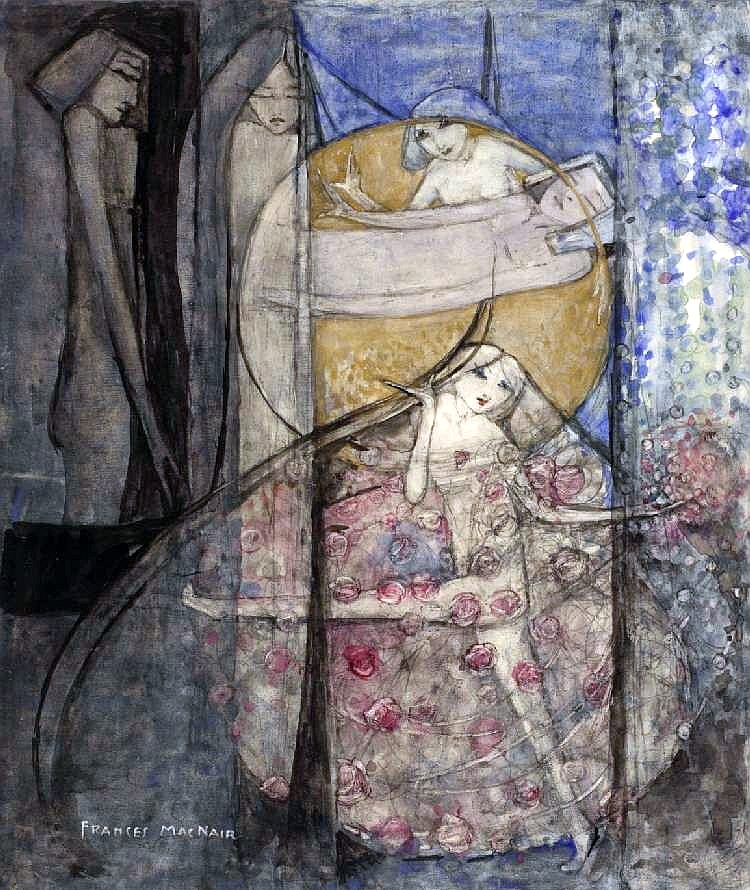
Woman Standing Behind the Sun

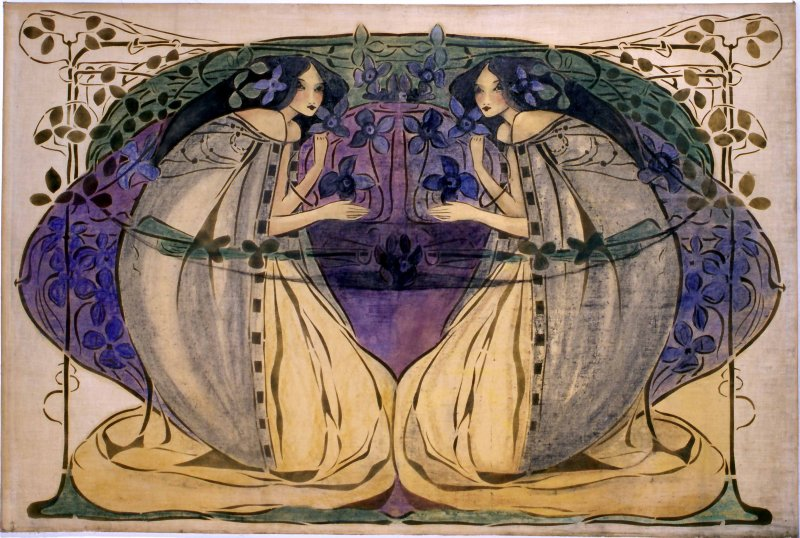
Spring

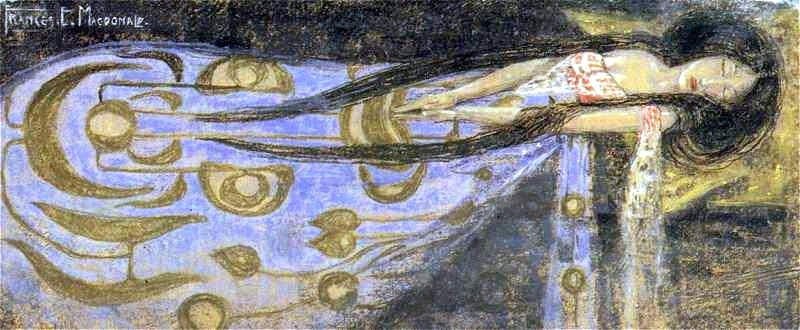
The Sleeping Princess, 1910.

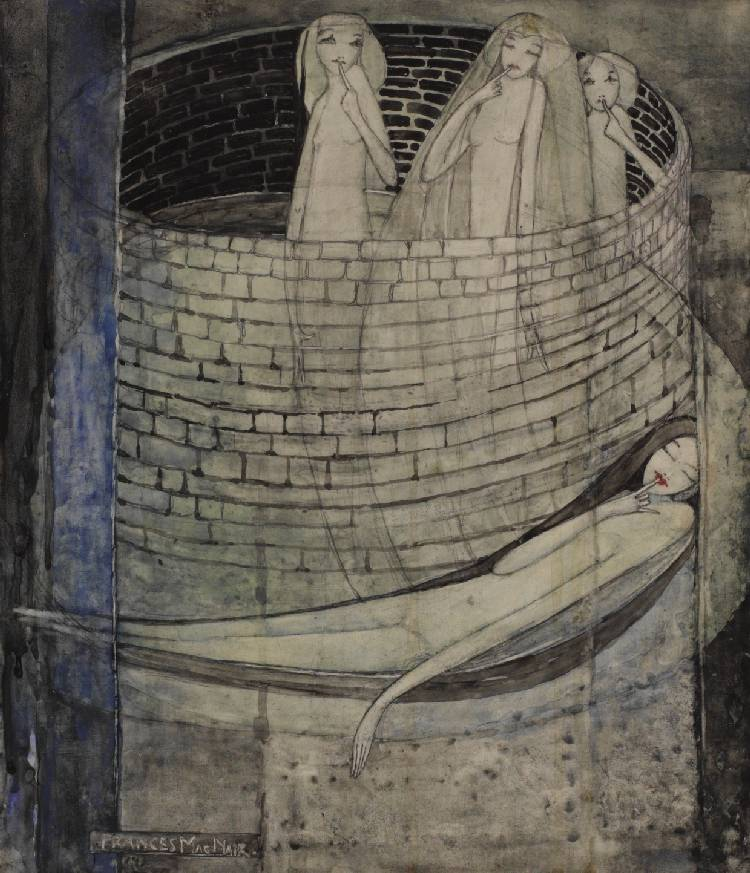
Truth Lies at the Bottom of the Well, 1912–1915.
