= Thomas Simmonds =

Headteacher of the Glasgow School of Art
- In office 1881 – 1885
- Preceded by: Robert Greenlees
- Succeeded by: Fra Newbery

Personal details
- Born: Thomas Charles Simmonds; 1842
- Died: August 12, 1912 (aged 70)
- Education: James Duffield Harding
- Occupation: Artist, educationalist

Thomas Charles Simmonds (1842 - 12 August 1912) was an artist; and former Headteacher of the Glasgow School of Art. He was headteacher from 1881 to 1885. He was the last full serving headteacher of the school, as his successor Fra Newbury although beginning as headteacher, was deemed a Director of the Art School instead.

== Life ==
Thomas Charles Simmonds was born in 1842 in Cheltenham to Thomas Simmonds (1815 - 1868) and Alice Cole (c. 1817 - 1889), and baptised on 24 July 1842.

At the age of 18 he was working as a student teacher. He studied art under James Duffield Harding and later under William Collingwood Smith. He shortly became a private teacher of art in Cheltenham.

He was asked by some backers to be the headmaster of a new art school in Derby in 1870. The school succeeded and in 1876 moved to new premises.

He set up a new School of Art in Chesterfield, and then one in Burton on Trent. He was then recommended for the post of Headmaster at the Glasgow School of Art.

The Derbyshire Advertiser and Journal of Friday 13 November 1908 stated that:

[Simmonds] found in Glasgow a large school with 1000 students, working with energy but without success in the competitions in London. He was well supported by the committee, teachers and students and the school rapidly became a success. After two years it stood out at the head of Scottish schools; and in the higher awards it was more successful than Manchester, Liverpool, Nottingham and other important schools. It is interesting to read of the progress of the work in the reports published by the committee.

New Schools of Art were established in Helensburgh and Dumbarton and four branches in the city of Glasgow. In connection with the shipbuilding on the Clyde, new art studios were established in the yards of Messrs. Denny Bros. Dumbarton and two old students from Derbyshire were appointed by the firm to take charge. Here were produced high class decorations for the saloons of the steamers such as figure panels, painted tiles, stained glass and wood carvings, under the direction of the Headmaster. Among the alumni of the Dumbarton School of Art was painter, George Harcourt.

He was to leave the Glasgow School of Art in April 1885, although his contract ran to August 1885. This created a war of words between the committee and Simmonds; with Simmonds claiming the extra months and monies he saw as due to him when his students were successful. It led to an 'embittered correspondence' with the school.

He was again to become the Headmaster of the Derby School of Art. In 1892, the School transferred over to the Derby Corporation. It was merged with a School of Science; and then renamed Derby Technical College, but the Town Council kept Simmonds on as Headmaster.

Simmonds had a large family, and many of his sons followed him in teaching art.

== Art ==
From the Derbyshire Advertiser and Journal of Saturday 17 August 1912:

He was among the first exhibitors in London of enamelling in the manner of Limoges, and introduced it as a part of the craft work in the School of Art. He also much time and attention designing for manufacturers, and had intimate knowledge of the technical requirements weaving, paper staining, china decoration, etc. Large numbers of carpets manufactured in Kidderminster and Halifax were from his designs.

From the Cheltenham Examiner of Thursday 15 August 1912:

He had been a successful exhibitor at the Royal Academy and other exhibitions. In 1903, in recognition of his services rendered to Art education, the degree of A.R.C.A. (London) was conferred on him.

== Death ==
He died on 12 August 1912 at his home in Ravenshoe, Derby. Simmonds or his students had designed the interior of Ravenshoe as it was described as a 'riot of Arts and Crafts shapes and all hand done'. He was buried on 15 August 1912 at Nottingham Road Cemetery in Derby. He was buried alongside his wife who died in March 1908.

He left an estate of £2313, 19 shillings and 6 pence. Around £650 was given to his son Ernest William Arthur Simmonds.
