= William Collingwood =

William Collingwood may refer to:

- William Collingwood (1819–1903), English watercolourist, father of W.G. Collingwood
- W. G. Collingwood, William Gershom Collingwood (1854–1932), English author and artist

== See also ==
- William Collingwood Smith (1815–1887), English watercolourist, cousin of the elder William Collingwood
