= Samuel Williamson (painter) =

English landscape painter

- Born: 1792; Liverpool, England
- Died: 7 June 1840 (aged 47–48)
- Occupation: Landscape painter

Samuel Williamson (1792 – 7 June 1840) was an English landscape painter.

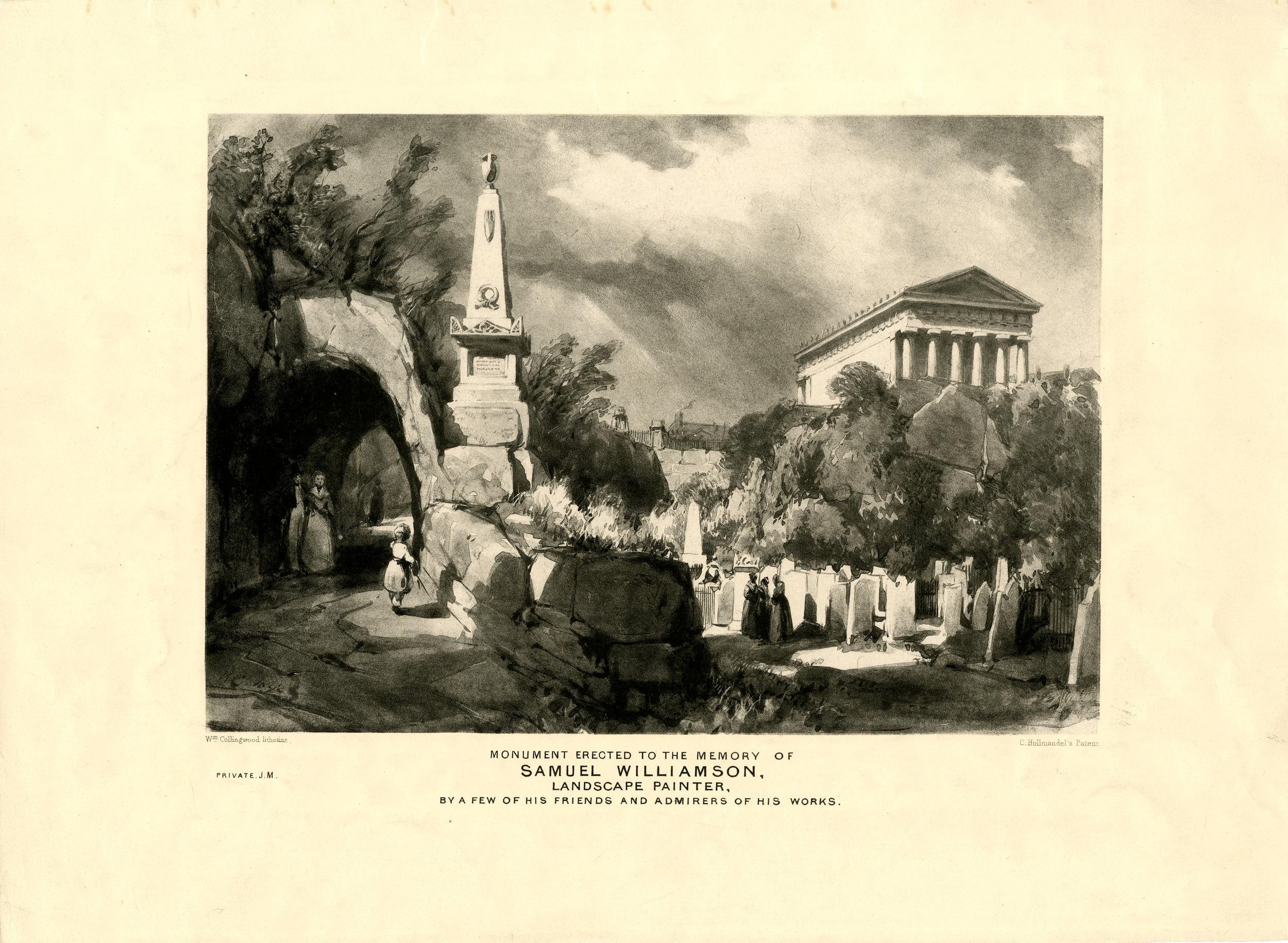
"Monument erected to the memory of Samuel Williamson, landscape painter" by William Collingwood

== Biography ==
Williamson was the younger son of John Williamson of Liverpool, in which town he was born in 1792. In 1811 Samuel had three landscapes hung in the first exhibition of the Liverpool Academy, of which body he was a member. In the subsequent exhibitions of that body, as well as at the first exhibition of the Royal Manchester Institution in 1827 and the annual exhibitions that followed each year, he was represented by a large number of landscapes and seascapes. His only exhibit on the walls of the Royal Academy was a landscape in 1811. He earned a considerable reputation as a painter of seapieces and landscapes, and was highly esteemed by his fellow-townsmen. On his death, which took place on 7 June 1840, an obelisk to his memory was erected in the St. James's cemetery, a lithograph of which, by William Collingwood, was published. His pictures are well composed, and are painted with an attractive charm of light and colour. There are three works by him at the Walker Art Gallery, Liverpool, and many more in private collections in the district.
