= Dumbarton School of Art =

19th century art school

The Dumbarton School of Art was established in 1884 as a satellite of the Glasgow School of Art, in the Academy Building of Burgh Hall, Church Street, Dumbarton. The original location was in the attic apartment of Burgh Hall, which also housed Dumbarton Academy and the offices of Dumbarton royal burgh, the town's municipal corporation. From 1900 the School's management was merged into Dumbarton Academy, but the school's activities continued under the name of Dumbarton School of Science and Art until 1937.

== History ==
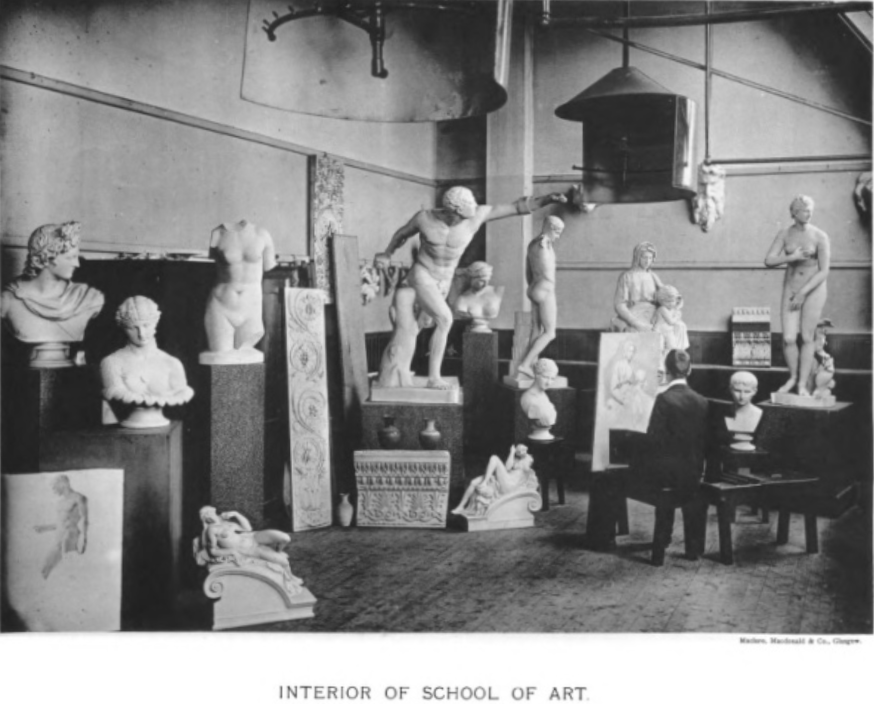
Interior of Dumbarton School of Art circa 1890

A meeting to launch the Dumbarton School of Art was held in Dumbarton Academy on 21 November 1882. Peter Denny, the shipbuilder was appointed president of the school, with his son William Denny, who was particularly supportive of the initiative, as the chairman.

In final preparations before the original planned opening in 1882, a workman's candle sparked a fire of the wood panelling, which all but destroyed the building itself. William Denny (1847-1887) rescued the project and supported it by offering scholarships for any of his apprentices who enrolled in the School of Art. The school opened for the autumn term of 1884, and was marked by a public meeting in Burgh Hall on 25 November 1884. Peter Denny took the chair and among the dignitaries on the platform were Sir Phillip Cunliffe-Owen and Thomas Simmonds, who was the first headmaster of the school. The meeting was told that there were over 100 students for the initial intake.

The Denny family continued their financial support of the school, funding a travelling scholarship which allowed talented students to study abroad. Other Denny family members attended the school as students. Local dignitaries funded other scholarships for the school's students.

Thomas Simmonds left the school in 1885 to return to his native Derbyshire. Benjamin Strongman became the school's second head in July 1885, and had previously taught at the Glasgow School of Art alongside Thomas Simmonds. In 1904 Strongman retired and returned to his home town of Falmouth. He was succeeded as head by his daughter, Amy, who had attended the school as a student, was a member of the Glasgow Society of Lady Artists and a teacher at Dumbarton Academy. She had previously studied in London, at what is now called the Royal College of Art, formerly the National Art Training School.

The school offered evening classes to give continuing education options for those in work, many would have been involved in the local shipbuilding industries. The school's curriculum expanded into subjects such as mathematics and electrical engineering, and became renamed as the Dumbarton School of Science and Art. The school's existence as an independent institution ended in 1900, when the original Dumbarton School of Art formally merged into Dumbarton Academy. Though technically a department of the Academy, the Dumbarton School of Science and Art continued under that name, along with day and evening classes, and was headed by Amy Strongman. She retired in 1923, with her successor being James Boyd. The final prize-giving ceremony under the name of Dumbarton School of Science and Art was in 1937.

== Notable alumni ==
George Harcourt RA (1868-1947), Scottish portrait and figure painter.

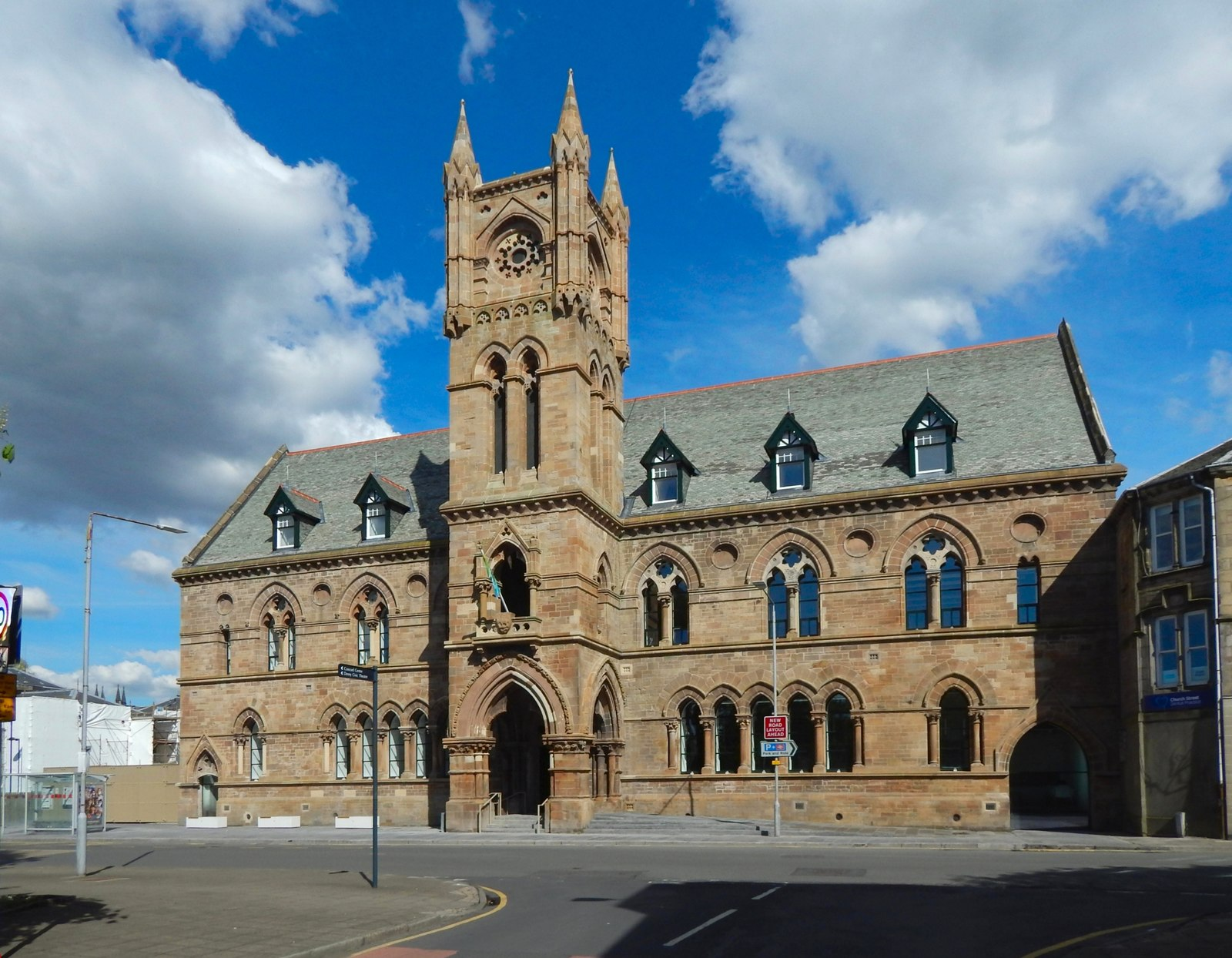
Burgh Hall Dumbarton
