= Jón Stefánsson (academic) =

Jón Stefánsson (1862-1952) was an Icelandic scholar. He wrote many books, articles and contributions to periodicals.

Jón was born in Grundarfjordur in 1862 and went on to study at Reykjavík Grammar School and then the University of Copenhagen. At Copenhagen he produced a doctoral thesis (1891) on Robert Browning. Shortly after he left Copenhagen for London where he was to spend much of the next 50 years. In 1897 he took the British artist and scholar W. G. Collingwood on a tour of Iceland. Jón and Collingwood co-authored A pilgrimage to the saga-steads of Iceland with illustrations by Collingwood. They also collaborated on a translation of one of the sagas.

In October 1918 he married a widowed French Mauritian woman, Adrienne de Chazal. Shortly after their marriage they moved to Mauritius but Jon became ill and returned to Iceland and then back to London. In London he spent much of his time in the British Museum writing but he was also an acquaintance of a wide range of scholars including William Morris, William Paton Ker, James Bryce and Israel Gollancz. In London he worked for a few years as a lecturer in Icelandic and Danish at King's College. During the early years of World War II, following the occupation of Denmark, Jón, speaking as a key figure among Icelanders in the UK suggested to Churchill that Icelanders might welcome the occupation of Iceland by the British.

In his old age Jón wrote an autobiography or memoir which was published in 1949. Úti í heimi: endurminningar (Out in the World).
