= John Williamson (English painter) =

English painter

- Born: 1751; Ripon, England
- Died: 27 May 1818 (aged 66–67)
- Occupation: Portrait painter

John Williamson (1751 – 27 May 1818) was an English portrait painter.

== Biography ==
Williamson was born at Ripon in 1751. He was apprenticed to an "ornamental" painter in Birmingham, married in 1781, settled in Liverpool in 1783, and continued to reside there, practising as a portrait-painter, till his death, on 27 May 1818. Among his best known works are portraits of William Roscoe, Sir William Beechy, R.A., Henry Fuseli, R.A., the Rev. John Clowes, and Peter Litherland, the inventor of the patent lever watch. He was a member of the Liverpool Academy, and a constant exhibitor at the local exhibitions. In 1783 he exhibited a portrait at the Royal Academy. His portraits are correct likenesses and fairly executed. He also painted miniatures, but they were not in the best style of that art.

His son, Samuel Williamson, was also a painter.
