= Francis Henry Newbery =

British artist

Fra Newbery

Director of the Glasgow School of Art
- In office 1885 – 1917
- Preceded by: Thomas Simmonds
- Succeeded by: John Henderson

Personal details
- Born: 15 May 1855
- Died: 18 December 1946 (aged 91)
- Education: Glasgow School of Art
- Occupation: Artist, educationalist

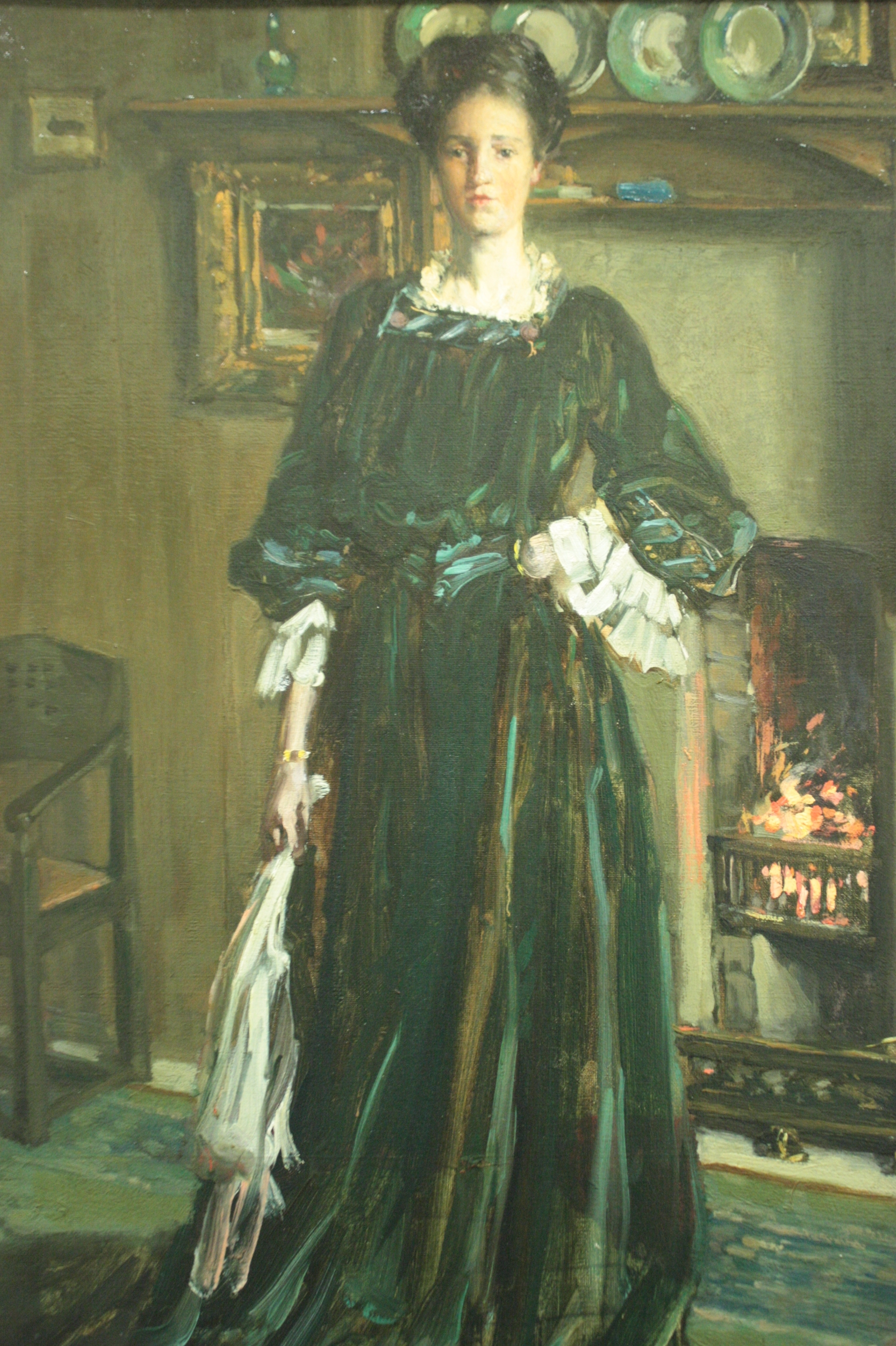
Eileen Lavery by F. H. Newbery, 1913, National Gallery of Scotland

Francis Henry Newbery or Fra Newbery (15 May 1855 – 18 December 1946) was an English painter and art educationist, best known as director of the Glasgow School of Art between 1885 and 1917. Under his leadership the School developed an international reputation and was associated with the flourishing of Glasgow Style and the work of Charles Rennie Mackintosh and his circle. Newbery helped commission Mackintosh as architect for the now famous School of Art building and was actively involved in its design.

== Biography ==
Born in Devon to a shoemaker and his wife, Newbery went to school in Bridport, Dorset, where he qualified as a teacher, and later as an art master. While working and studying in London he won an 'Art Master in Training' scholarship in 1881.

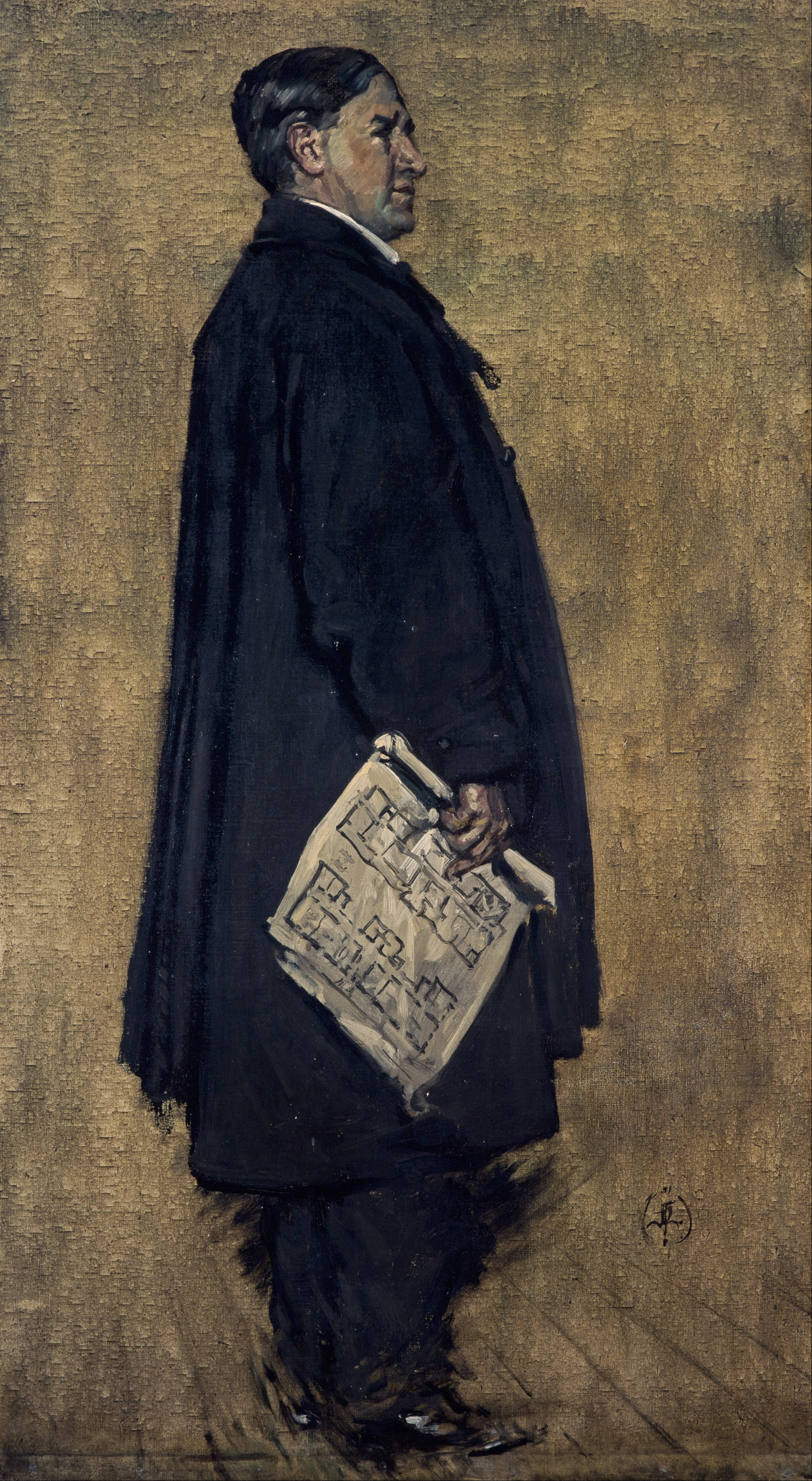
Portrait of Charles Rennie Mackintosh (1914)

At the Glasgow School of Art he was a vigorous and innovative headmaster. He gave teaching posts to practising artists rather than relying on certificated art masters. He established an art club allowing students to branch out from the national art school course, and employed several women teachers, unlike most other UK art schools of the time. Newbery established craft workshops and introduced embroidery classes where his wife, Jessie Newbery, played an important part. Overall, he wanted students to have a strong training in traditional techniques, while developing their unique individual talent. His own painting was associated with the Glasgow Boys' and he was close to James Guthrie and John Lavery.

Under Francis Newbery's direction the School's prestige grew, both internationally and at home. His reputation as a successful director was enhanced by the high profile of various Glasgow artists of the 1890s and early 20th century whose development he had fostered. After retiring he returned to Dorset and lived with his wife in Corfe Castle. He painted until 1932 and died on 18 December 1946.
