= W. G. Collingwood =

English author, artist, antiquary and professor of Fine Arts (1854–1932)

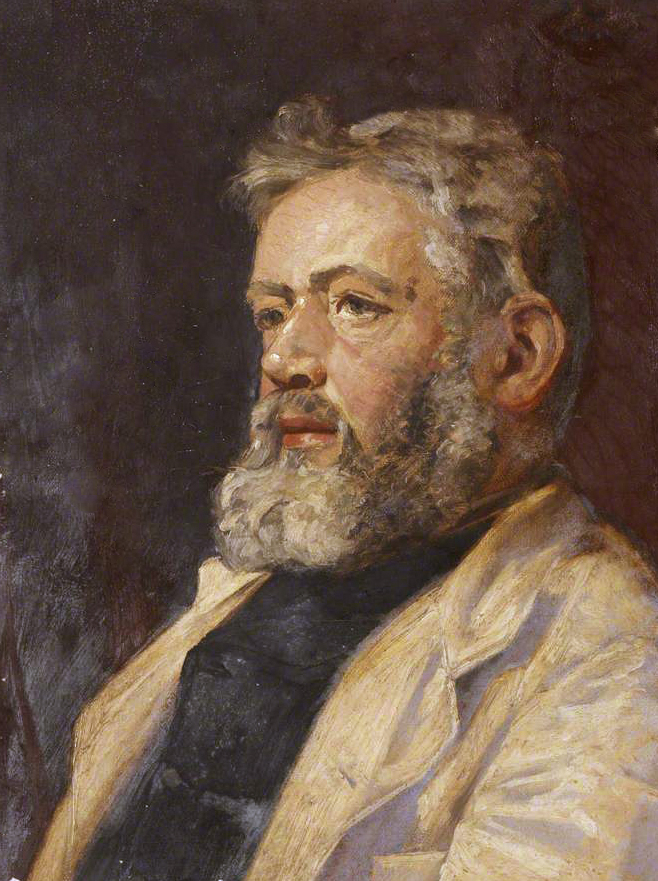
Self portrait as sea captain

William Gershom Collingwood (/ˈkɒlɪŋˌwʊd/; 6 August 1854 – 1 October 1932) was an English author, artist, antiquary and professor of Fine Arts at University College, Reading. A long-term resident of Coniston, Cumbria, he was President of the Cumberland and Westmorland Antiquarian Society (1920-32) and the Lake Artists' Society.

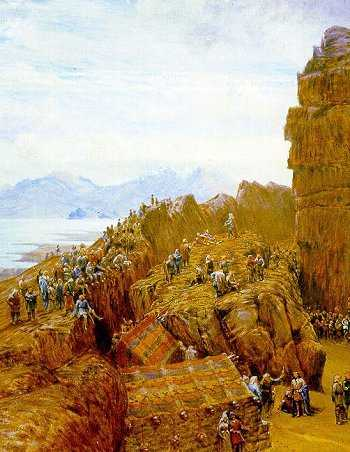
Althing in Session, the law speaker of the Althing; the Icelandic parliament, by Collingwood

Hawkshead War Memorial

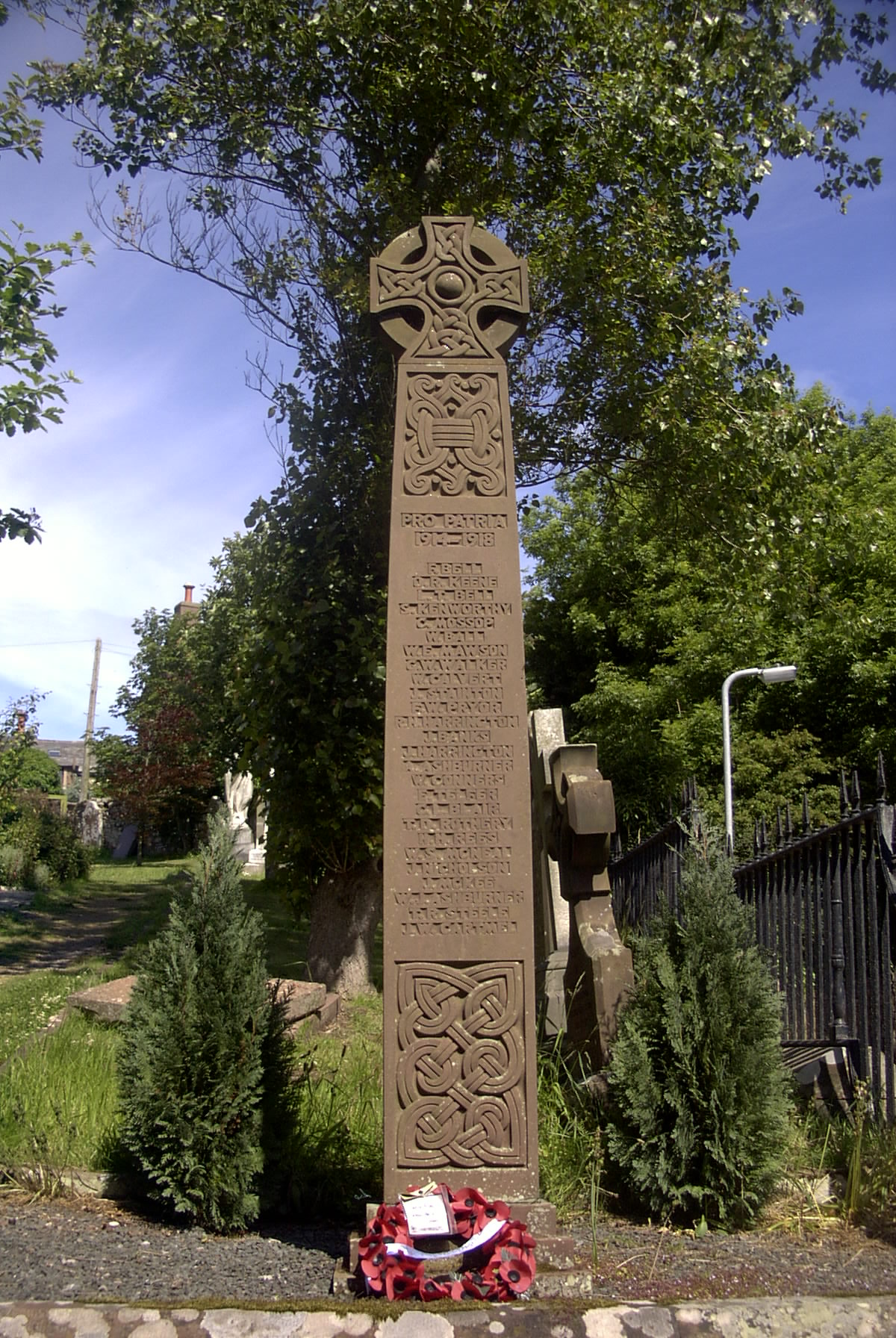
St Bees war memorial

== Life ==
William Gershom Collingwood was born in Liverpool, the son of William Collingwood RWS. His father was also a watercolour artist, and had married Marie Elisabeth Imhoff of Arbon, Switzerland in 1851. Soon young William was sketching with his father in the Lake District, North Wales, and Switzerland.

He received his early education at Liverpool College. In 1872, he went to University College, Oxford, where he met John Ruskin. During the summer of 1873 Collingwood visited Ruskin at Brantwood, Coniston. Two years later Collingwood was working at Brantwood with Ruskin and his associates. Ruskin admired his draughtsmanship, and so Collingwood studied at the Slade School of Art between 1876 and 1878. He exhibited at the Royal Academy in 1880.

For many years Collingwood dedicated himself to helping Ruskin, staying at Brantwood as Ruskin's assistant and travelling with him to Switzerland. In 1883 he married Edith Mary Isaac (1857–1928) and settled near to Ruskin in the Lake District. Collingwood edited a number of Ruskin's texts and published a biography of Ruskin in 1893.

In 1896, Arthur Ransome met the Collingwoods and their children, Dora (later Mrs Ernest Altounyan), Barbara (later Mrs Oscar Gnosspelius), Ursula, and Robin (the later historian and philosopher). Ransome learned to sail in Collingwood's boat, Swallow, and became a firm friend of the family, even proposing marriage to both Dora and Barbara (on separate occasions). After a summer of teaching Collingwood's grandchildren to sail in Swallow II in 1928, Ransome wrote the first book in his Swallows and Amazons series of books. He used the names of some of Collingwood's grandchildren for his characters, the Swallows (see Roger Altounyan).

By the 1890s Collingwood had become a skilled painter and also joined the Cumberland and Westmorland Antiquarian and Archaeological Society. He wrote a large number of papers for its Transactions; becoming editor in 1900. Collingwood was particularly interested in Norse culture and the Norsemen, and he wrote a novel, Thorstein of the Mere which was a major influence on Arthur Ransome.

In 1897, Collingwood travelled to Iceland where he spent three months over the summer exploring with Jón Stefánsson the sites around the country in which the medieval Icelandic sagas are set. He produced hundreds of sketches and watercolours during this time (e.g. an imagined meeting of the medieval Althing), and published, with Stefánsson, an illustrated account of their expedition in 1899 under the title A Pilgrimage to the Saga-steads of Iceland.

Collingwood was a member of the Viking Club and served as its president. In 1902 he co-authored again with Jón Stefánsson the first translation it published, a translation of Kormáks saga entitled, The Life and Death of Kormac the Skald. His study of Norse and Anglican archaeology made him widely recognised as a leading authority. Following Ruskin's death Collingwood continued to help for a while with secretarial work at Brantwood, but in 1905 went to University College, Reading (now the University of Reading) and served as professor of fine art from 1907 until 1911.

Collingwood joined the Admiralty intelligence division at the outbreak of the First World War. In 1919, he returned to Coniston and continued his writing with a history of the Lake District and perhaps his most important work, Northumbrian Crosses of the pre-Norman Age. He was a great climber and swimmer, and a tireless walker into advanced age. In 1927 he experienced the first of a series of strokes. His wife died in 1928, followed by Collingwood himself in 1932. He was buried in Coniston.

== War memorials ==
Following the Armistice of 1918, and the peace treaty of 1919, Collingwood's services were much in demand as a designer of War Memorials. His knowledge of and enthusiasm for Scandinavian crosses is displayed at Grasmere where the memorial on Broadgate Meadows is a pastiche of an Anglian cross. The short verse at its base was penned by his close friend Canon Hardwicke Rawnsley who was chair of the memorial committee. Other examples of his Celtic type memorial crosses may be seen at Otley, Coniston and the K Shoes factory in Kendal. That at Hawkshead was sculpted by his daughter, Barbara. Other memorials designed by Collingwood may be seen at Ulverston, St Bees and Lastingham. His diary for 1919–20, held in the Abbot Hall Art Gallery, Kendal, contains brief allusions to other possible memorials; at Rockcliffe, Carlisle and an unknown bridge, probably in north Cumberland.

== Legacy ==
Collingwood founded the Ruskin Museum in Coniston in 1901. It holds material related to Collingwood. However the archive of family papers, the Collingwood Collection, is now held at the Special Collections and Archives department of the Cardiff University Library.

The largest part of Collingwood's paintings of Iceland are held in the National Museum in Reykjavik: other locations include Abbot Hall Art Gallery.

Possibly Collingwood's most lasting legacy was his influence on his son R. G. Collingwood, the philosopher and historian.
