= William Collingwood Smith =

British painter

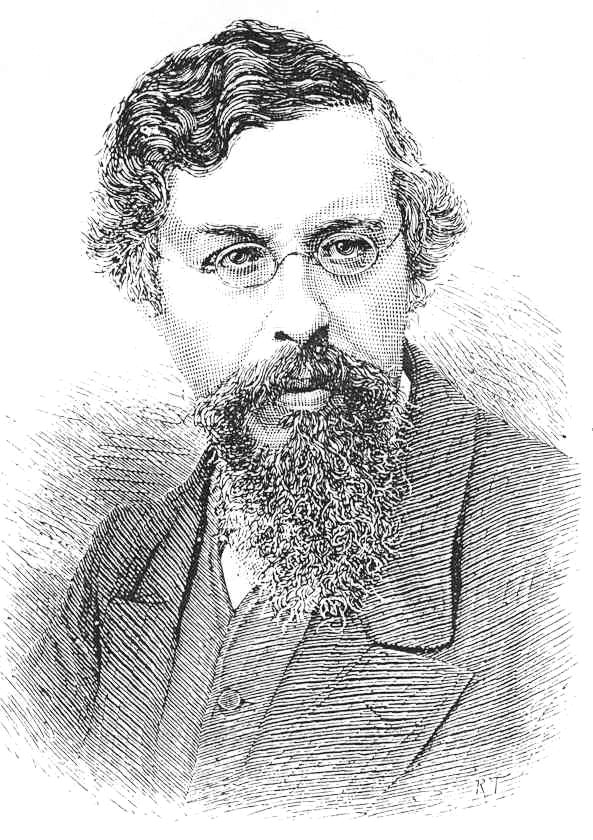
Illustration to his obituary in the Illustrated London News, 1887

William Collingwood Smith RWS (10 December 1815 Greenwich – 15 March 1887 Brixton Hill), was a British watercolourist. He should not be confused with his cousin William Collingwood (1819 – 1903), also a watercolour painter and RWS member.

William's father William Smith worked for the Admiralty and was a musician and amateur artist. William had no formal training in art, but had studied under James Duffield Harding. Initially he painted in oils, but later became a proficient watercolourist. In 1843 he became an Associate, and subsequently a Member, of the Society of Painters in Water Colours which later became the Royal Watercolour Society, serving as treasurer for some twenty years, and starting its Art Club. He also joined the New Society of Painters in Water Colours.

Specialising in marine and river scenes, and sweeping landscapes, he turned out more than a thousand paintings and drawings. He travelled extensively in Britain and on the Continent, often painting scenes which had news interest. His images were often engraved and reproduced in the Illustrated London News. Shipping scenes he painted included HMS Dreadnought, which took part in the Battle of Trafalgar. His first exhibition at the Royal Academy was in 1836 and his last in 1855, also exhibiting with the Royal Watercolour Society and at the Suffolk Street Galleries.

He enjoyed an outstanding reputation as a teacher so that his classes at Wyndham Lodge, 13 Brixton Hill, included not only amateurs, but also professionals, and military and naval officers. His works are to be found in numerous galleries, both public and private.

His grave is in the West Norwood Cemetery. He is buried there alongside his wife Louisa Triquet and his son William Harding Collingwood Smith who was also an artist.

== Gallery ==
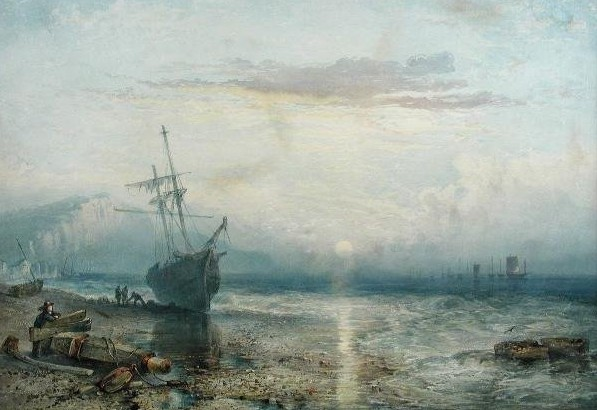

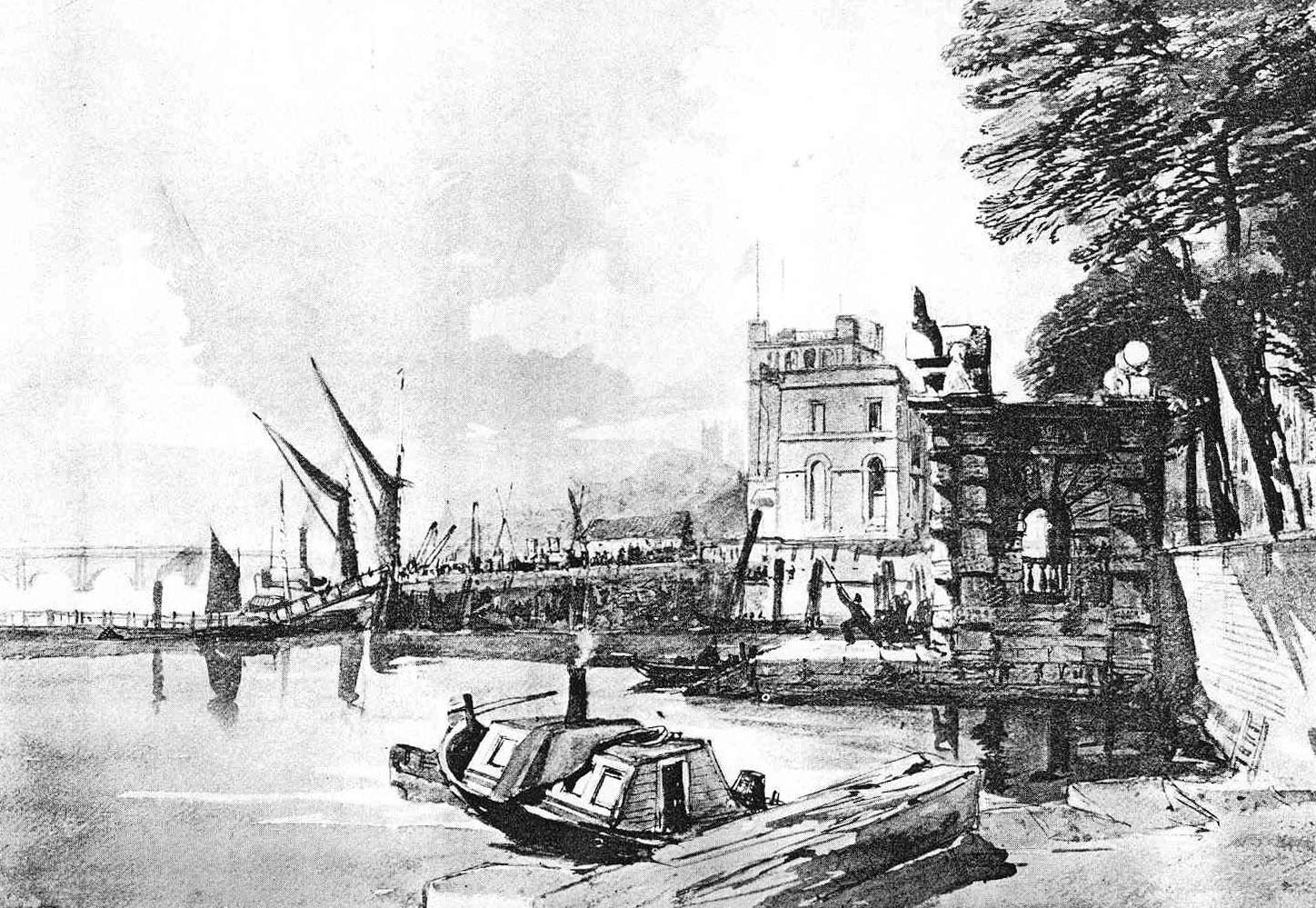

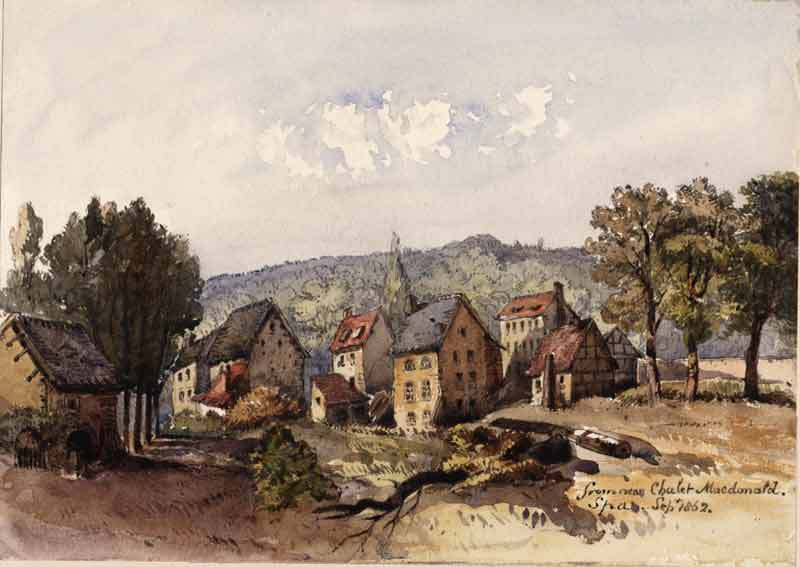

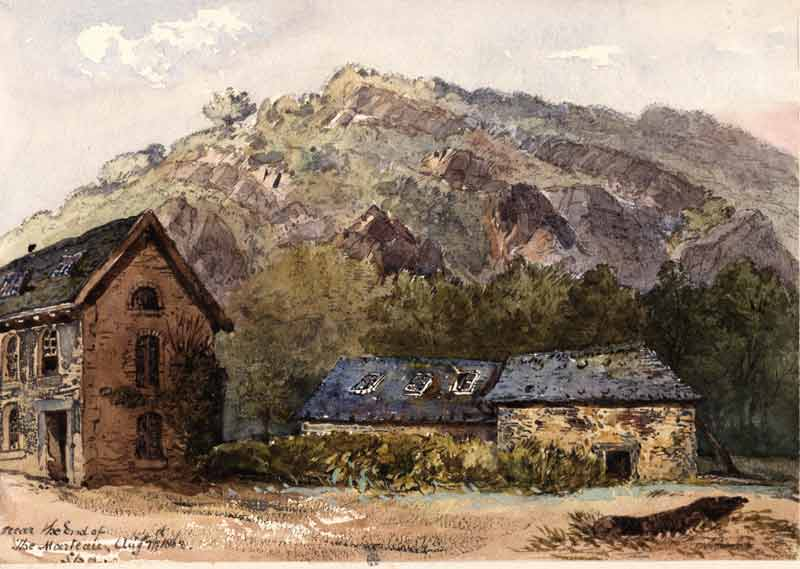
