= George Harcourt (painter) =

British painter

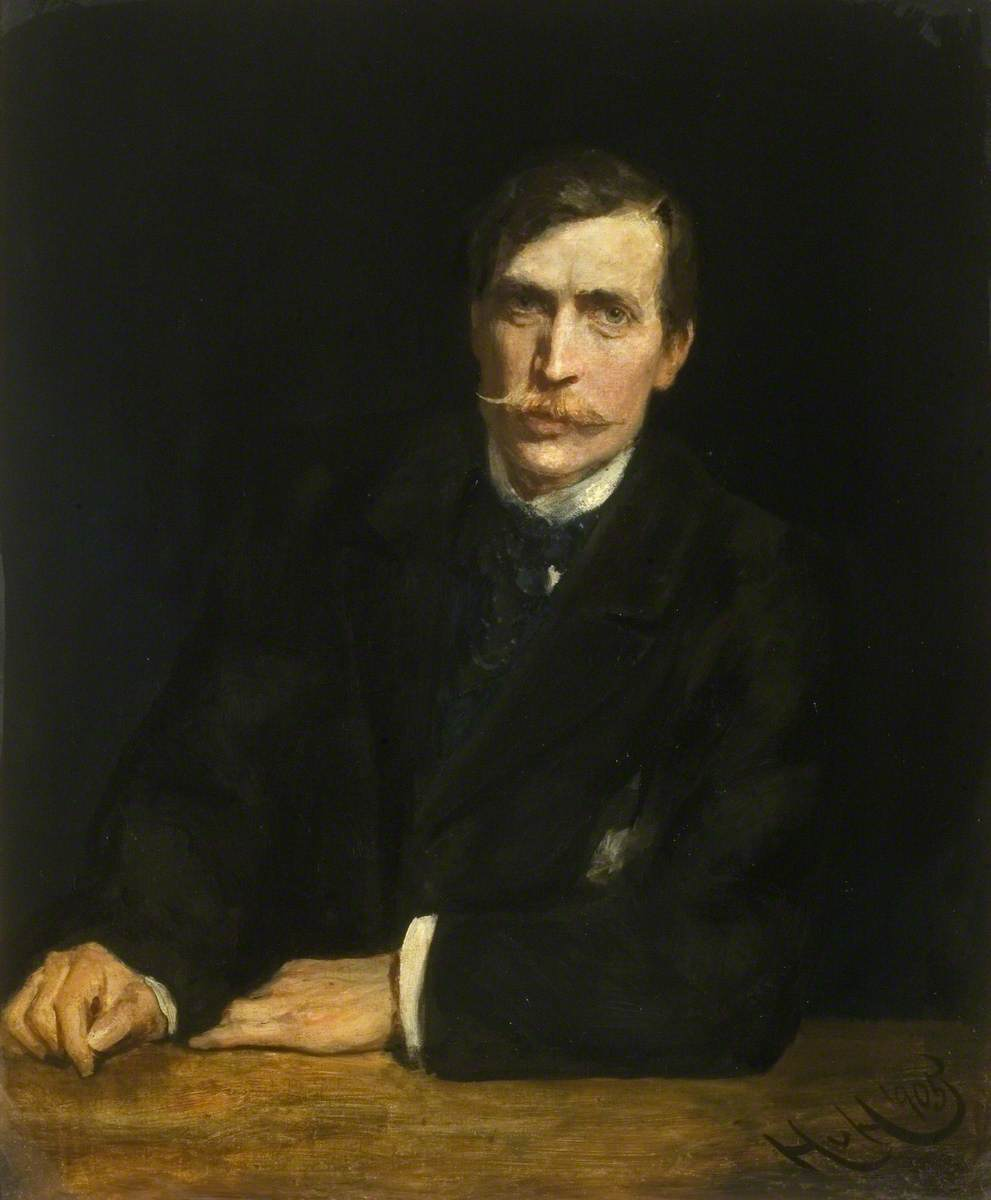
- Portrait of George Harcourt, 1905
- Born: 11 October 1868; Dumbarton, Scotland
- Died: 30 September 1947 (aged 78); Bushey, England
- Known for: Painter
- Notable work: Clement Attlee
- Style: Portrait and figure painter
- Spouse: Mary Lascelles Leesmith
- Elected: Royal Academy

George Harcourt RA (11 October 1868-30 September 1947) was a Scottish portrait and figure painter, known for painting influential members of society.

== Biography ==
Born in Old Kilpatrick in 1868, Harcourt's family moved to nearby Dumbarton while he was still a toddler. In the 1871 census Harcourt's family were living, with two lodgers, in a modest property in the HIgh Street, Dumbarton and Henry Harcourt, George's father worked as a labourer.

Harcourt received his initial art training at the Dumbarton School of Art, a satellite of the Glasgow School of Art which operated in Dumbarton at the end of the 19th century. His 1887 third grade examination, for painting in monochrome, gave him the result as "fair" but he achieved a "good" for ornamental design. Aged 20 he won the Denny Scholarship which funded further studies abroad.

He studied at the Herkomer School of Art in Bushey from 1889–92 and later went on to become the head of school. He rose to become the President of the Royal Society of Portrait Painters in 1945 following a spell as vice-president (1934–45) and was also the Director of the Royal Academy. He first became an associate of the Royal Academy in 1919 (ARA) and was then elected as an Academician (RA) in 1926. In 1944 he was elected as a senior Academician (Senior RA) and became Director of Schools in 1927.

After studying art in Dumbarton, Harcourt initially worked as an interior decorator of salons and luxury cabins at the local shipyard Denny Brothers Shipbuilding. In 1888 he went to Bushey, north London, and enrolled in the Herkomer School of Art. The school, founded by the German-born painter Hubert von Herkomer (1849-1914) in 1883, enjoyed a good reputation in England at the time and was known for its unconventional educational practice. As one of the best students, Harcourt later became a lecturer at the art school. Later, he taught at the London Slade School of Fine Art, where his daughter Anne studied.

Over the years, Harcourt's style of painting changed from a Pre-Raphaelite influenced naturalism (here mainly genre paintings, more rarely landscapes) to an almost photorealistic portraiture. This perfection not only gave him a reputation among colleagues, but also secured him a good income as a portraitist of the British upper class.

He submitted to the Royal Academy of Arts his diploma thesis (A Portrait of Miss Anne Harcourt), this proved he had skills that went beyond the naive kitsch of his earlier years.

In 1893 George Moore reviewed the artworks at the Royal Academy commenting in The New Review, London, on a portrait exhibited there by George Harcourt - At the Window.

Harcourt died on 30 September 1947.

== Paintings ==
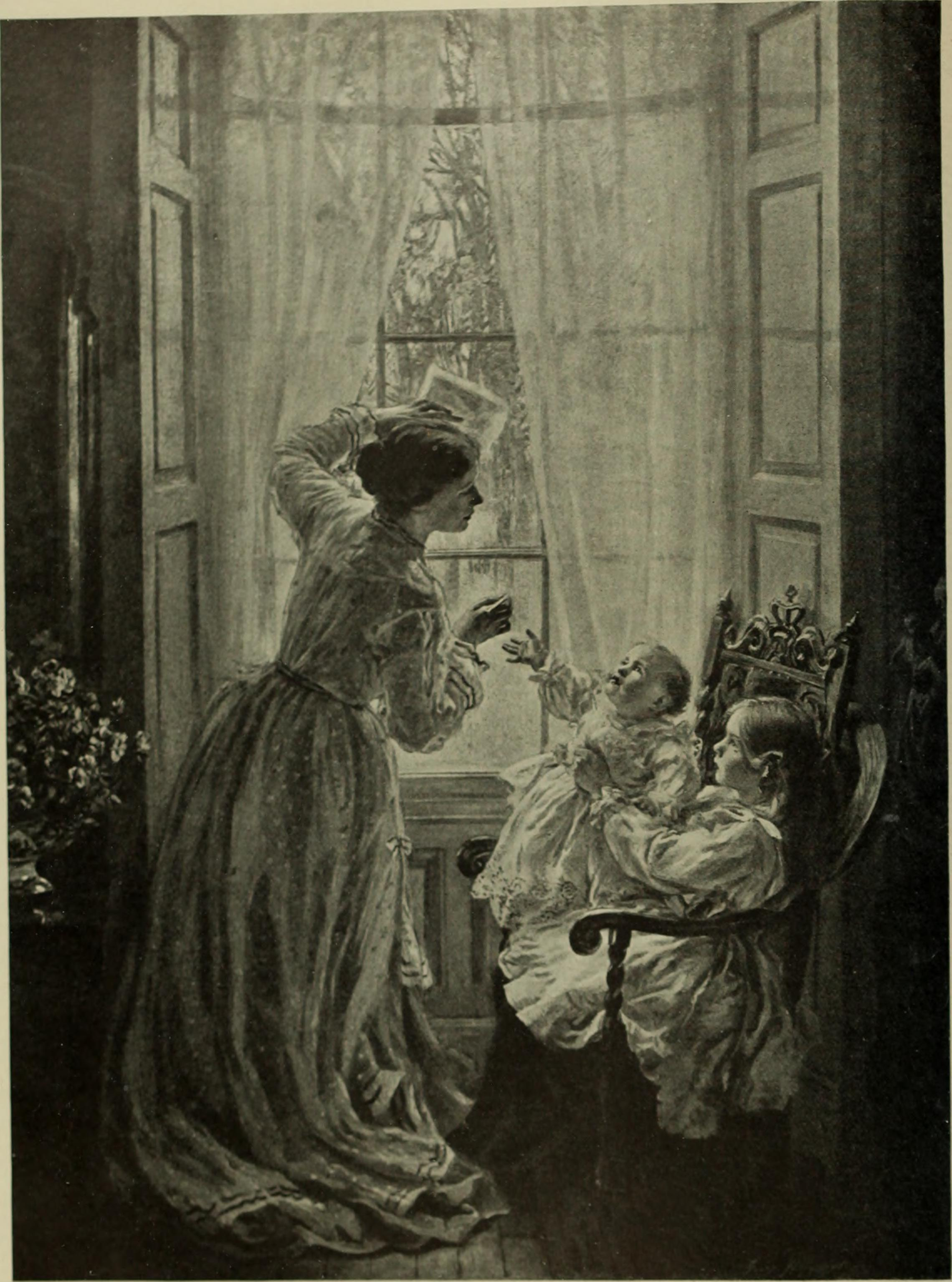
The Tracing (1897)

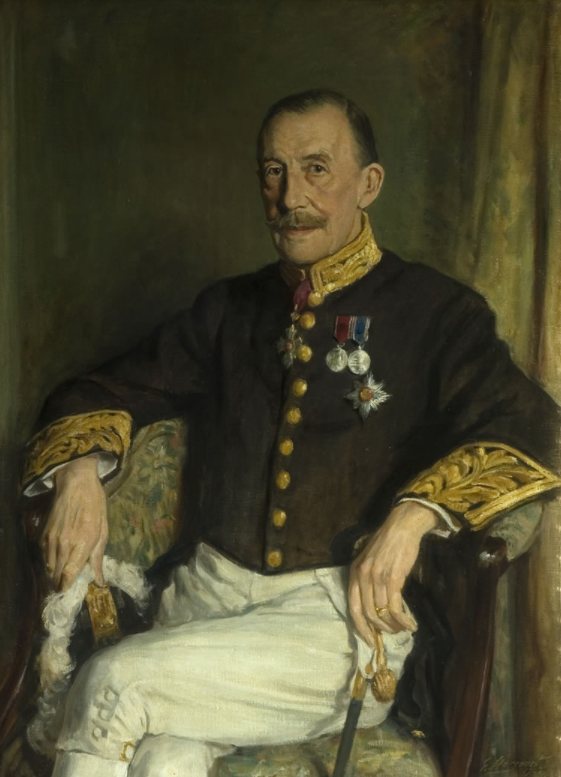
The Lord Hemingford (1944)

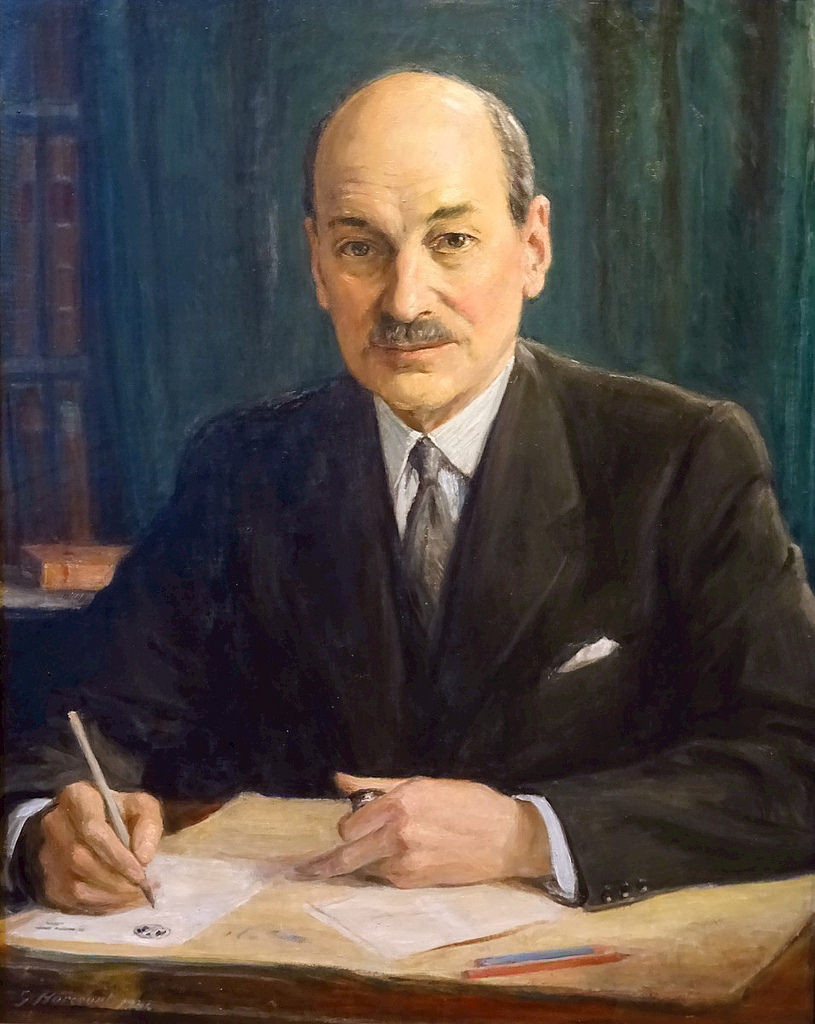
Clement Attlee (1946)
- 1893: At the Window (exhibited at the Royal Academy)
- 1894: Psyche (issued in the Royal Exchange in London)
- 1899: Forgiven (now in the National Gallery in Adelaide, Australia)
- 1901: Meriel, Cynthia and George Perkins
- 1905: "Melody" (exhibited at the Museo de Arte de Ponce in Puerto Rico)
- 1910: The Birthday (now in the Lady Lever Art Gallery, Port Sunlight near Liverpool)
- 1914: George Nathaniel Curzon (started by Herkomer, completed by Harcourt, owned by Oxford University)
- 1920: Portrait of a young girl
- 1921: Portrait of Miss Anne Harcourt (his daughter later became his pupil)
- 1924: Sir Maurice Fitzmaurice (the admiral was director of the British secret service of the Royal Navy NID)
- 1931: The Krupp von Bohlen and Halbach Family (owned by the Krupp Foundation in the Villa Hügel)

== Awards ==
Harcourt received in 1912 a gold medal at the International Exhibition in Amsterdam. In 1921 he submitted to the jury of the Royal Academy of Art, a portrait of his daughter Anne. He was admitted in 1926 as a full member of the Academy (RA). Up to this point he was an Associate Royal Academician (ARA), which he had held since 1919. He also briefly became Deputy Director of the Royal Academy Schools. In 1923 he got another gold medal in the exhibition at the Salon de Paris.

== Exhibitions ==
The Exhibition of the Royal Academy of Arts (1927)

Memorial Exhibition of George Harcourt and Francis Hodge. Royal Institute of Painters in Water Colour (1949).

Stand to your work. Hubert Herkomer and his students. Watford Museum, Watford 1983, ISBN 0-907958-05-2. (Catalog of the exhibition in the Watford Museum A passion for work: Sir Hubert von Herkomer 1849-1914, September 1983).
