= William Collingwood (1819–1903) =

English landscape watercolour painter

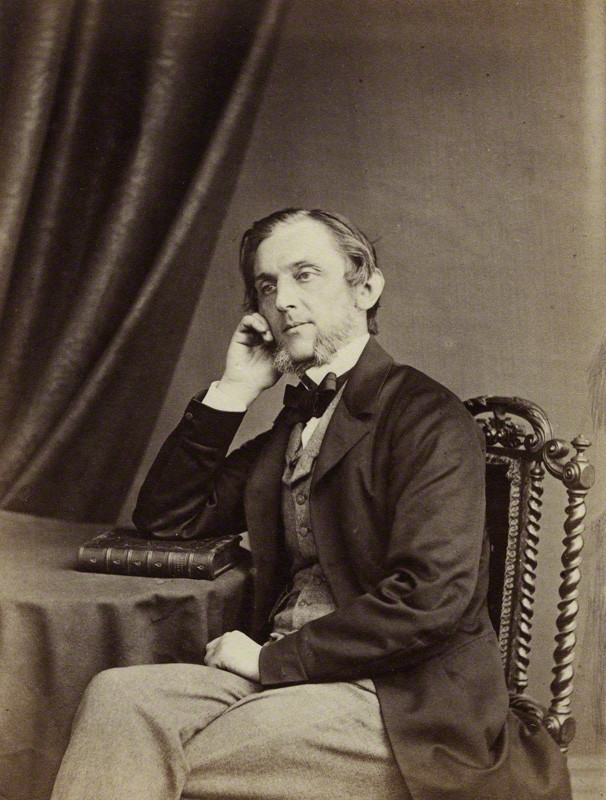
- Portrait of William Collingwood, Watercolourist (c. 1864) by Cundall, Downes & Co
- Born: 23 April 1819; Greenwich
- Died: 25 June 1903; Bristol, England
- Education: Christ Church School, Oxford (declined a Christ Church studentship; did not matriculate); encouraged by James Duffield Harding and William Collingwood Smith
- Known for: Landscape painter
- Movement: Royal Watercolour Society
- Spouse: Maria Imhof

William Collingwood R.W.S. (23 April 1819 – 25 June 1903) was an English watercolour painter best known for his mountain landscapes. He also wrote on religion. He should not be confused with his cousin, the painter William Collingwood Smith, or his son, the painter, author and antiquarian William Gershom Collingwood, who was John Ruskin's "disciple and secretary".

== Early life ==
Collingwood was born in Greenwich, London. His father, Samuel Collingwood, was an architect and surveyor. After leaving school, his family placed him in the office of J. J. Ackermann, the art publisher, where he began to draw untaught. James Duffield Harding used his influence with the firm to which he was apprenticed to release him, and gave him a start in four lessons; Collingwood later wrote that it was to Harding he owed “my adoption of art as a profession”. In 1838, at Hastings, he formed the friendships that shaped his artistic development: the watercolourist Samuel Prout, who held the position of Painter in Water-Colours in Ordinary to George IV, in whose studio he spent many evenings; and, through the collector Mr Maw, the watercolourist William Hunt, with whom he later painted together at West Hill House. His first teaching engagement, with a ducal family, came through Prout's introduction. He initially painted in oils before becoming a proficient watercolourist.

== Career ==
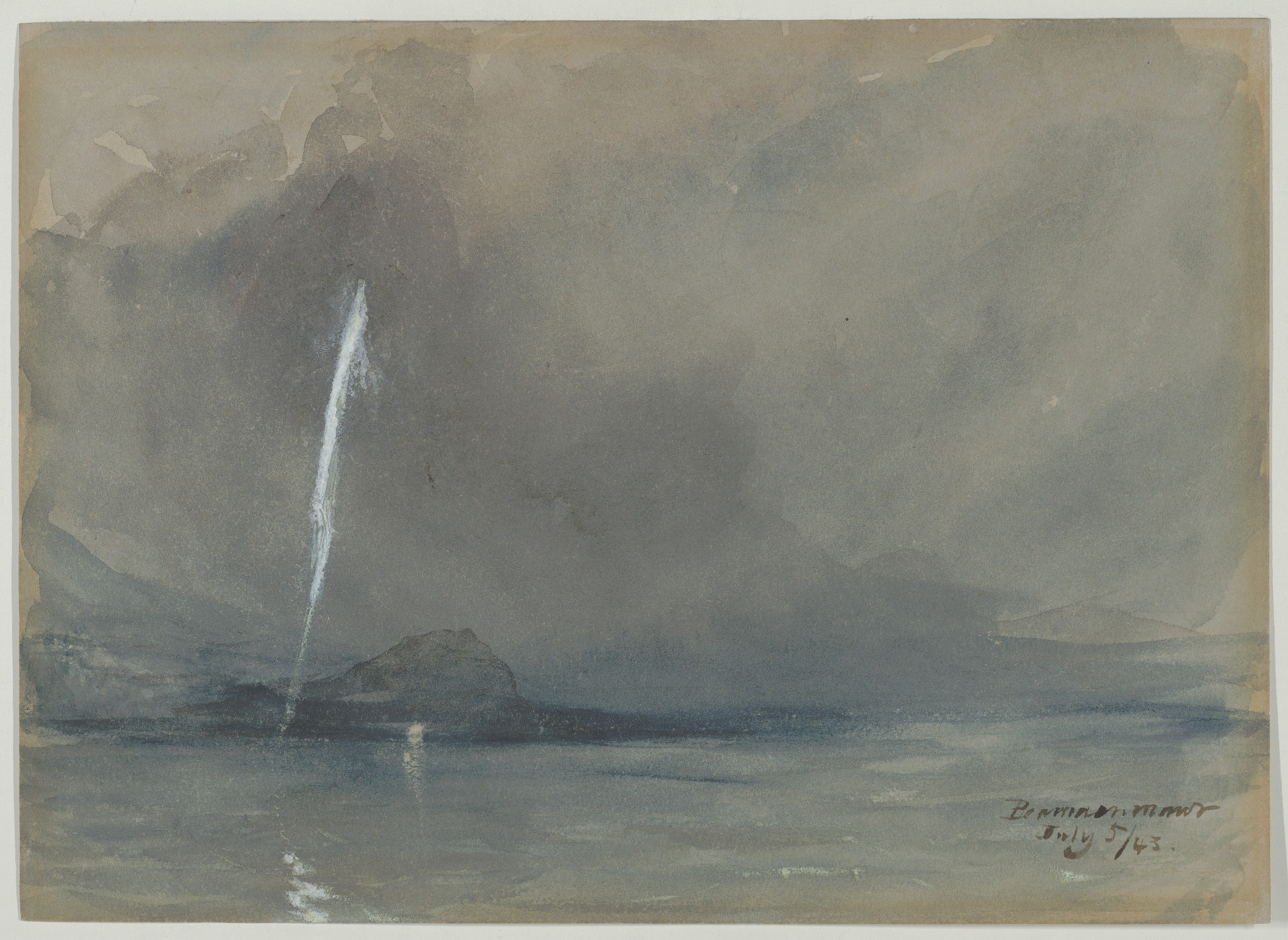
File:Beaumaris Mount, near Bangor, Wales, watercolour, 1843, Metropolitan Museum of Art, done when he was 24.

In 1845 Collingwood was elected to the New Water-Colour Society of Liverpool, became an Associate of the Royal Watercolour Society in 1855, and a full member of the same society in 1884. He specialised in mountain landscapes and travelled extensively in Britain and continental Europe. He exhibited with the Water Colour Society, later the Royal Watercolour Society, between 1856 and 1890, as well as at the Royal Academy of Arts between 1839 and 1860 and at the Royal Society of British Artists at the Suffolk Street Gallery. He was placed on the list of Honorary Retired Members of the RWS in 1901.

== Later life ==
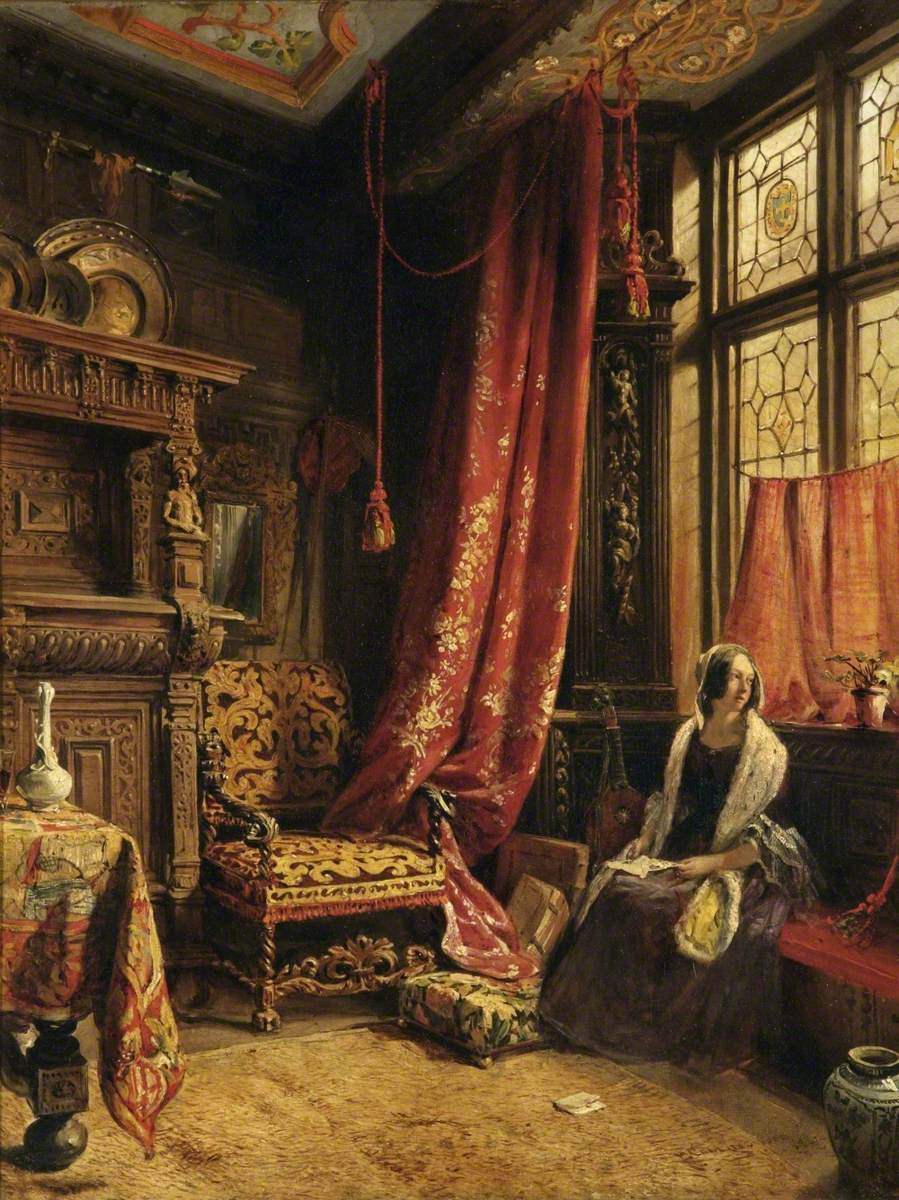
An Antique Interior at West Hill House, Hastings, oils, 1842, Walker Art Gallery

He spent many years in Liverpool, where he was a lay preacher for the Plymouth Bretheren, later joining the Open Brethren after the schism. In 1850, influenced by Dr. Karl Gutzlaff, Collingwood considered travelling to China as both artist and missionary. This plan was abandoned following his marriage in 1851 to Marie Imhof of Arbon, Switzerland. Marie died on 16 May 1873. He became a supporter of missionary work, hosting many missionaries in his Liverpool home.

In 1890 he settled in Bristol, where he joined the Bristol Bethesda group and worked alongside George Müller. He wrote numerous papers and booklets, including The Bible its Own Evidence and The Brethren: An Historical Sketch. He also contributed articles on doctrine and spiritual themes to The Witness. He died in Bristol on 25 June 1903, aged 84; a stroke of paralysis had laid him low the previous month.

== Legacy ==
Collingwood’s reverential love for the Bible and his gentle character were noted by contemporaries. His artistic and religious contributions reflect the breadth of his interests and influence in nineteenth‑century Britain.
