= James Duffield Harding =

British landscape painter (1798–1863)

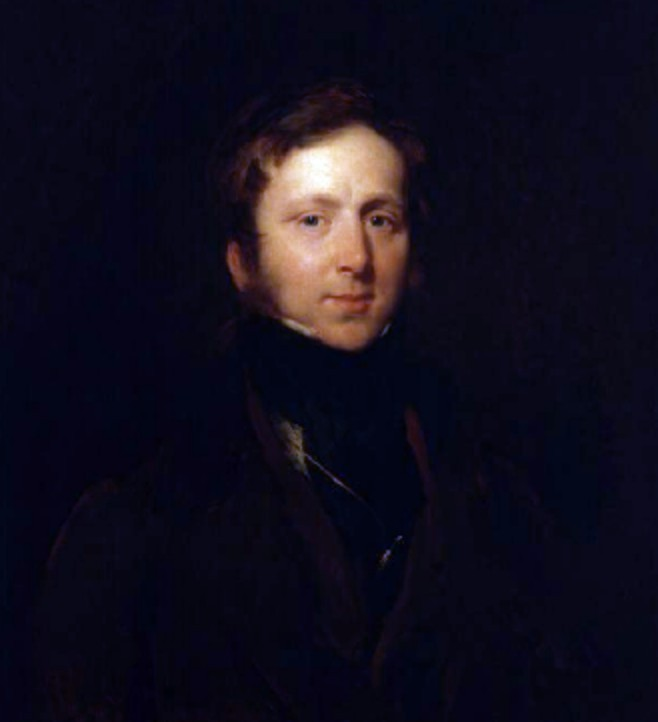
- Portrait of James Duffield Harding (c. 1840) by Henry Perronet Briggs
- Born: 1798; Deptford, London, England
- Died: 4 December 1863 (aged 64–65); Barnes, London, England
- Known for: landscape painter

James Duffield Harding (1798 – 4 December 1863) was a British landscape painter, lithographer and author of drawing manuals. His use of tinted papers and opaque paints in watercolour proved influential.

== Life ==
Harding was born at Deptford in 1798, the son of a drawing-master who had been a pupil of Paul Sandby. He was taught perspective by his father and had lessons from Samuel Prout. At the age of thirteen he exhibited two drawings of buildings in the style of Prout at the Royal Academy.

He was apprenticed to the engraver Charles Pye, but left him after only a year to concentrate on painting watercolours, and when he was 18 he was awarded a silver medal by the Society of Arts. In 1818 he showed with the Society of Painters in Watercolours, (known as the "Old Water-Colour Society" (OWCS) from 1831) for first time. He was to contribute to its exhibitions for the rest of his life. He was elected an associate of the society in 1820 and a full member in 1821. In 1843 he took up oil painting, and exhibited many landscapes in that medium at the Royal Academy. In 1847 he resigned his membership of the OWCS, hoping to be elected a member of the academy; but, after nine years without success, he withdrew his candidature, and was re-elected to the OWCS.

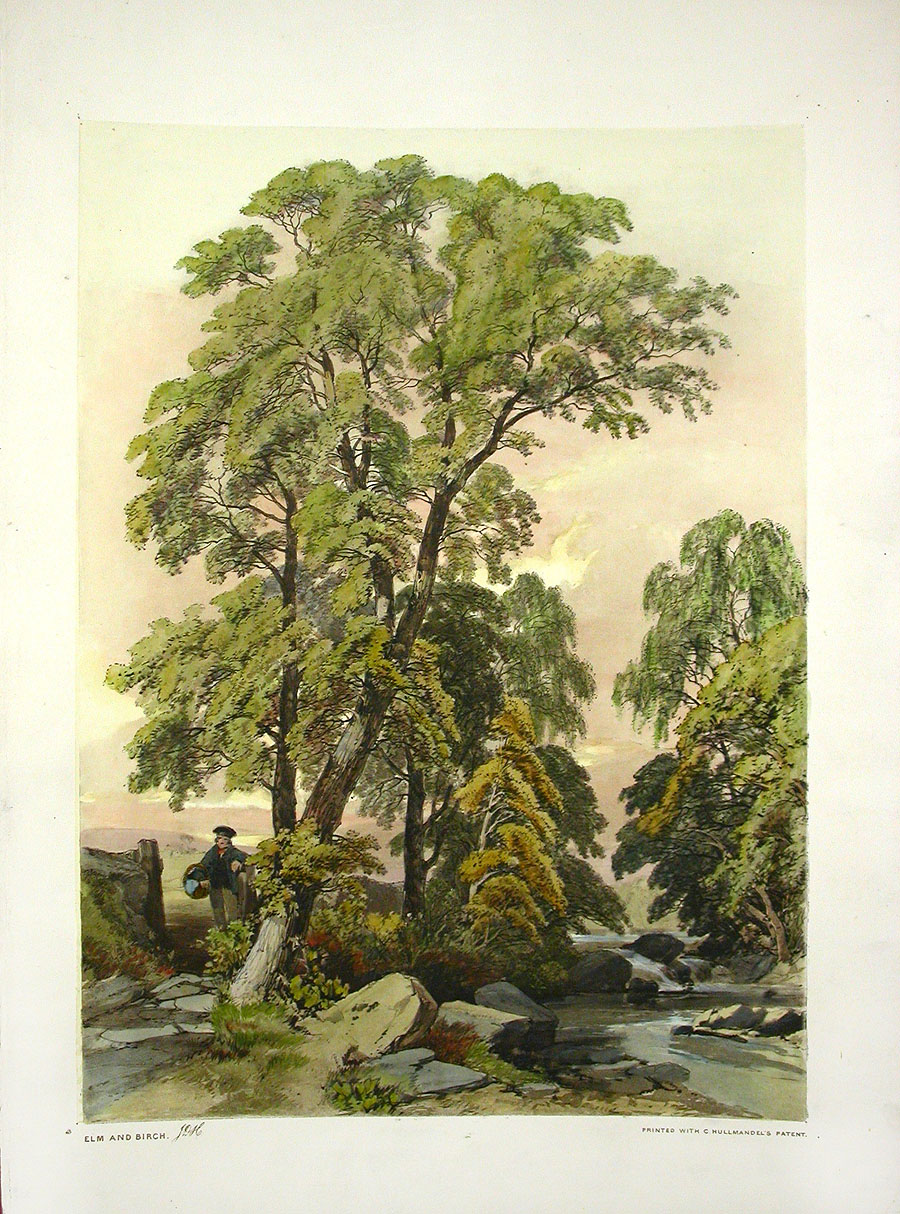
Elm and Birch

From an early on in his career Harding was a successful and popular teacher. When lithography became popular in Britain, he quickly adopted it as a means of reproducing good examples for the use of pupils and students. His first productions were drawing-books, consisting of pencil sketches and studies of trees; they were printed in tints with two stones, allowing the reproduction of more elaborate drawings. His Sketches at Home and Abroad, a series of fifty plates using this method, was published in 1836. In 1841 he published The Park and the Forest, a set of sketches drawn on the stone with a brush instead of the crayon, a technique of his own invention which he called "lithotint". His other lithographic works included A Series of Subjects from the Works of R. P. Bonington (1829–30); Recollections of India (1847, from drawings by C. S. Hardinge) and Picturesque Selections (1861).

In 1830, Harding exhibited a series of Italian views sketched on papers of various colours and textures, the style of which was widely imitated. His use of opaque body colour in watercolour, following the example set by J. M. W. Turner, also proved influential. His drawings were praised by John Ruskin in Modern Painters. From the 1830s a range of papers was produced under the name of "JDH pure drawing paper", initially for Winsor and Newton. The papers, which proved popular amongst both amateur and professional artists, and which Harding used himself, were produced in white, and in shades of cream, buff and grey. They were marketed until around 1910. Winsor and Newton also produced pencils under Harding's name.

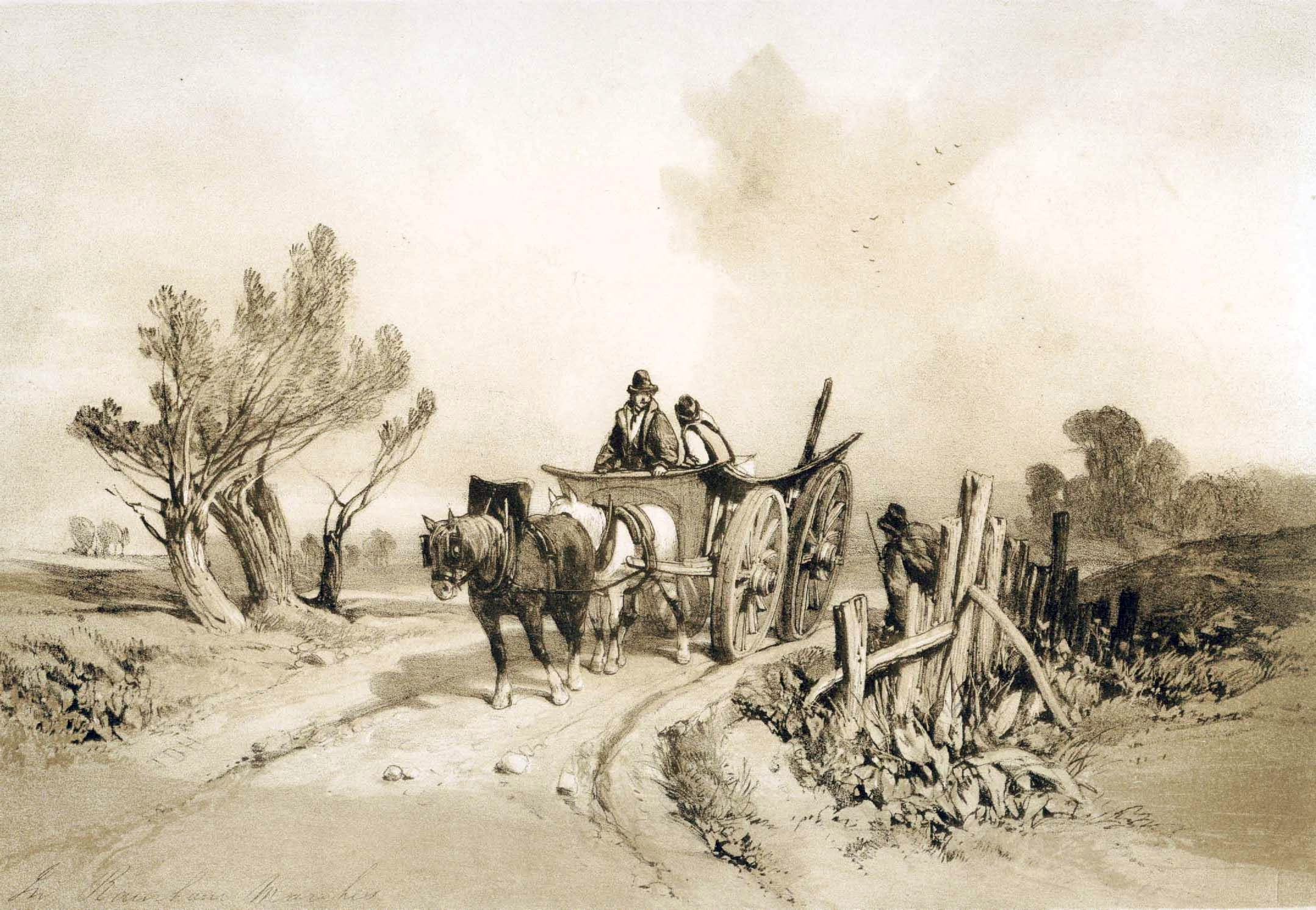
In Barnham Marshes

Harding was a prolific author of educational manuals, and his Lessons on Art, Guide and Companion to Lessons on Art, Elementary Art, or the Use of the Chalk and Lead Pencil advocated and explained, and The Principles and Practice of Art, were widely used both in Britain and abroad. His Drawing Models and Their Uses (1854) describes the use of a range of solid forms which he prepared and marketed.

He was described by Gilbert Redgrave in A History of Water Colour Painting in England as "a skilful and rapid draughtsman, though somewhat mannered, and rarely rising above the commonplace."

He died at Barnes, on 4 December 1863, and was buried in Brompton Cemetery.

== Sources ==
- This article incorporates text from a publication now in the public domain: Stephen, Leslie; Lee, Sidney, eds. (1890). "Harding, James Duffield". Dictionary of National Biography. Vol. 24. London: Smith, Elder & Co. pp. 336–7.
- Gilman, D. C.; Peck, H. T.; Colby, F. M., eds. (1905). "Harding, James Duffield" . New International Encyclopedia (1st ed.). New York: Dodd, Mead.
