= 1998 in the United Kingdom =

Events from the year 1998 in the United Kingdom.

== Incumbents ==
- Monarch – Elizabeth II
- Prime Minister – Tony Blair (Labour)

== Events ==
=== January ===
- 5 January – The UK takes over the Presidency of the EC's Council of Ministers until 30 June.

=== February ===
- 3 February – Stamps commemorating the late Diana, Princess of Wales, go on sale in the UK.
- 7–22 February – Great Britain and Northern Ireland compete at the Winter Olympics in Nagano, Japan, and win one bronze medal.
- 8 February – Former Conservative Cabinet Minister Enoch Powell dies in hospital in London aged 85.
- 12 February – Mohamed Al Fayed, the father of Dodi Fayed, says that he is "99.9% certain" that his son's death in the car crash that also claimed the life of Diana, Princess of Wales on 31 August 1997 was a conspiracy to kill rather than an accident. He also claims that his son had purchased an engagement ring just before the crash and had been preparing to propose marriage to Diana. A lawyer in Mr Al Fayed's native Egypt was planning to sue the Queen and UK Prime Minister Tony Blair on the grounds that they had conspired to kill Diana because her love for a Muslim would embarrass the country.
- 24 February – The conviction of Somali sailor Mahmood Mattan, hanged in 1952 at Cardiff Prison for the murder of pawnbroker Lily Volpert, is overturned by the Court of Appeal, with Mr Justice Rose describing the original conviction as "demonstrably flawed". The Mattan case is the first to be referred by the Criminal Cases Review Commission.
- 28 February – Lancet MMR autism fraud: A study by Andrew Wakefield published in The Lancet suggests a link between MMR vaccine and autism; although subsequently discredited and retracted, it is widely influential on vaccination rates.

=== March ===
- 6 March – Closure of South Crofty, the last working tin mine in Cornwall.
- 31 March – The Rolls-Royce Motors brand is acquired by German car manufacturer BMW.

=== April ===
- April – Vauxhall launches its fourth generation Astra small family car range. The initial range consists of hatchbacks, saloons and estates, with coupe and cabriolet models arriving in two years.
- 1 April – The historic counties of Herefordshire and Worcestershire are reestablished, 24 years after they merged to form Hereford and Worcester. Berkshire County Council is abolished and replaced by unitary authorities.
- 5 April – Rock drummer Cozy Powell, 50, is killed in a car accident on the M4 near Bristol.
- 10 April – The Good Friday Agreement, an agreement between the UK and Irish governments and the main political parties in Northern Ireland is signed.
- 27 April – Kevin Lloyd, who was best known for playing the character of Tosh Lines in The Bill, is dismissed from the role after ten years by ITV due to his alcoholism. He dies, the following week, aged 49.
- 28 April – Donna Keogh disappears in Middlesbrough.

=== May ===
- 2 May – Police in Maryland, United States, reveal that they have arrested and bailed former English footballer Justin Fashanu over an allegation of sexual assault against a seventeen-year-old male, and they believe he has now breached his bail conditions and fled the country; he commits suicide in London.
- 9 May – The Eurovision Song Contest held in Birmingham at the National Indoor Arena.
- 15 May – 24th G8 summit held in Birmingham.
- 20 May – Nurses Deborah Parry and Lucille McLauchlan, who had been convicted in Saudi Arabia for the murder of Yvonne Gilford the previous year, have their sentences commuted by the order of King Fahd and are returned to the UK.
- 23 May – Referendums on the Good Friday Agreement are held in the Republic of Ireland and Northern Ireland with 95% and 71% support respectively.

=== June ===
- June – The DVD format is released onto the UK market for the first time. Among the first set of titles released on the new format is Jumanji. The format will sell just over 6,000 discs by the end of the year.
- 15 June – First general-circulation issue of a two pound coin, with a bi-metallic design (dated 1997).
- 23 June – The Heathrow Express rail link begins operation.
- 27 June – The Diana, Princess of Wales Tribute Concert is held at Althorp Park in Northamptonshire, and attended by 15,000 people.

=== July ===
- 12 July – Drumcree conflict: Three young children are killed in a loyalist Ulster Volunteer Force arson attack in Ballymoney, Northern Ireland.
- 31 July
  - Crime and Disorder Act receives Royal Assent. It introduces Anti-Social Behaviour Orders, Sex Offender Orders, Parenting Orders, and 'racially aggravated' offences. It makes it possible for a young person between ten and fourteen to be presumed capable of committing an offence and formally abolishes capital punishment for treason and piracy, the last civilian offences for which the death penalty remained theoretically available.
  - The Government of Wales Act 1998, which will establish a devolved Welsh Assembly, receives Royal Assent.
  - The UK Government announces a total ban on the use of land mines by the British military.

=== August ===
- 10 August – Manchester United TV begins broadcasting, making Manchester United F.C. the world's second football team to have its own television channel, the first being Middlesbrough (Boro TV) in 1997.
- 15 August – Omagh bombing: A car bomb explodes in the Northern Irish market town of Omagh, County Tyrone, killing 29 people – the worst terrorist atrocity in the history of The Troubles in Northern Ireland. It has been planted by the Real Irish Republican Army.
- 18 August – Mathematicians Richard Borcherds and Timothy Gowers are awarded Fields Medals.
- 22 August – Reading F.C. move into their new Madejski Stadium, named after chairman John Madejski, near junction 11 of the M4 motorway in the south of Reading. It seats more than 24,000 spectators.
- 24 August
  - The Netherlands is selected as the venue for the Pan Am Flight 103 bombing trial of two Libyans who are charged with causing the explosion of an aircraft at Lockerbie that killed 270 people in December 1988.
  - First RFID human implantation tested in the United Kingdom by Kevin Warwick at the University of Reading.

=== September ===
- 8 September – The Real IRA announces a ceasefire.
- 10 September – In Northern Ireland, David Trimble of the Ulster Unionist Party meets Gerry Adams of Sinn Féin – the first such meeting between republicans and unionists since 1922.
- 16 September – The Union Jack dress worn by the Spice Girl Geri Halliwell is sold at Sotheby's for £41,320
- 19 September – Sarah Ferguson's mother, Susan Barrantes, is killed in a car accident in Argentina aged 61.

=== October ===
- October – Ford launches its new Focus range of small family hatchbacks, saloons and estates which will eventually replace the long-running Escort although that model would continue until the year 2000 and the van model lasting until 2002.
- 16 October – Indictment and arrest of Augusto Pinochet: Police place General Augusto Pinochet, the 83-year-old former dictator of Chile, into house arrest during his medical treatment in the UK at the request of Spain.
- 17 October – Actress Joan Hickson dies aged 92 of a stroke in a hospital at Colchester, Essex, six years after her final television appearance as Miss Marple.
- 27 October – Ron Davies resigns as Secretary of State for Wales, citing "an error of judgement" in agreeing to go for what he said was a meal with a man he had met while walking on Clapham Common in London, which is a well known gay meeting place, and subsequently being mugged.
- 28 October – The Poet Laureate Ted Hughes dies of cancer in a hospital in London, aged 68.

=== November ===
- November – Peugeot launches the 206 supermini which is being built at the Ryton plant near Coventry.
- 9 November – Human Rights Act receives Royal Assent.
- 24 November – The Queen's Speech announces the government plan to abolish the rights of 700 hereditary peers to sit and vote in the House of Lords; unprecedentedly this is met with audible "hear hears".
- 25 November – Appointed Regional development agencies and Regional chambers ("Regional assemblies") in England are created under the Regional Development Agencies Act.
- 26 November – Tony Blair becomes the first Prime Minister of the United Kingdom to address the Oireachtas (Parliament of the Republic of Ireland).

=== December ===
- December – The Ford Focus is voted European Car of the Year.
- 10 December
  - John Hume and David Trimble win the Nobel Peace Prize.
  - John Pople wins the Nobel Prize in Chemistry "for his development of computational methods in quantum chemistry".
- 26 December – Great Boxing Day Storm: severe gale-force winds hit Ireland, southern Scotland and northern England. Roads, railways and electricity are disrupted.
- 29 December – Three British tourists are among those shot during a gun battle to free them from kidnappers in Yemen.

=== Date unknown ===
- The Unmanned Aerial Vehicle Systems Association is created.

== Publications ==
- Beryl Bainbridge's novel Master Georgie.
- Iain M. Banks' novel Inversions.
- Julian Barnes's novel England, England.
- Ted Hughes's poetry collection Birthday Letters.
- Nigella Lawson's guide How to Eat: the pleasures and principles of good food.
- Ian McEwan's novel Amsterdam.
- John O'Farrell's political memoir Things Can Only Get Better.
- Terry Pratchett's Discworld novels The Last Continent and Carpe Jugulum.
- J. K. Rowling's novel Harry Potter and the Chamber of Secrets.

== Births ==
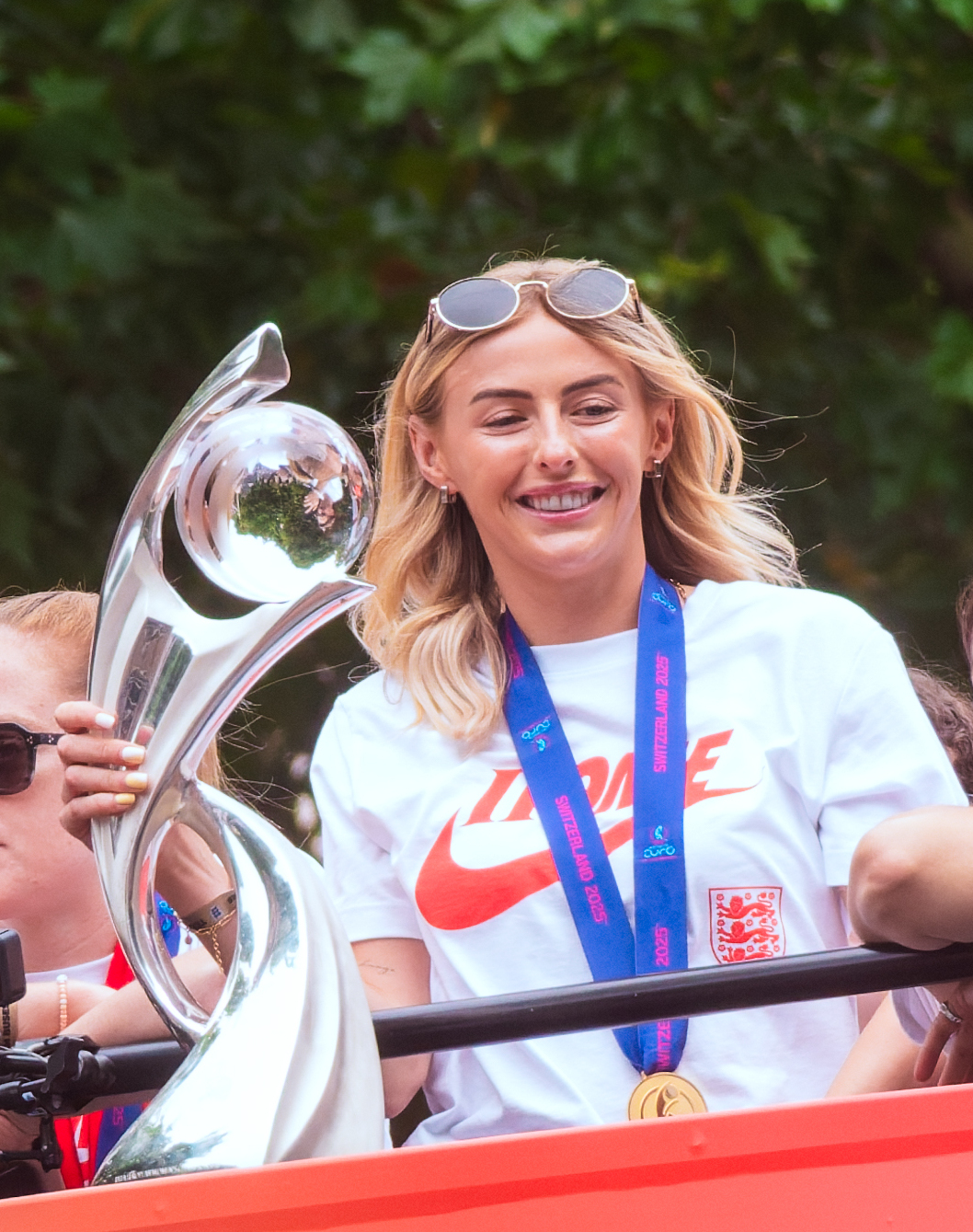
Chloe Kelly

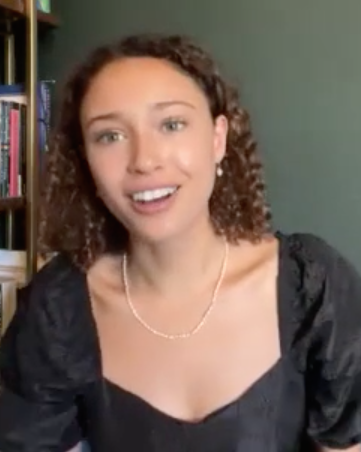
Ella-Rae Smith

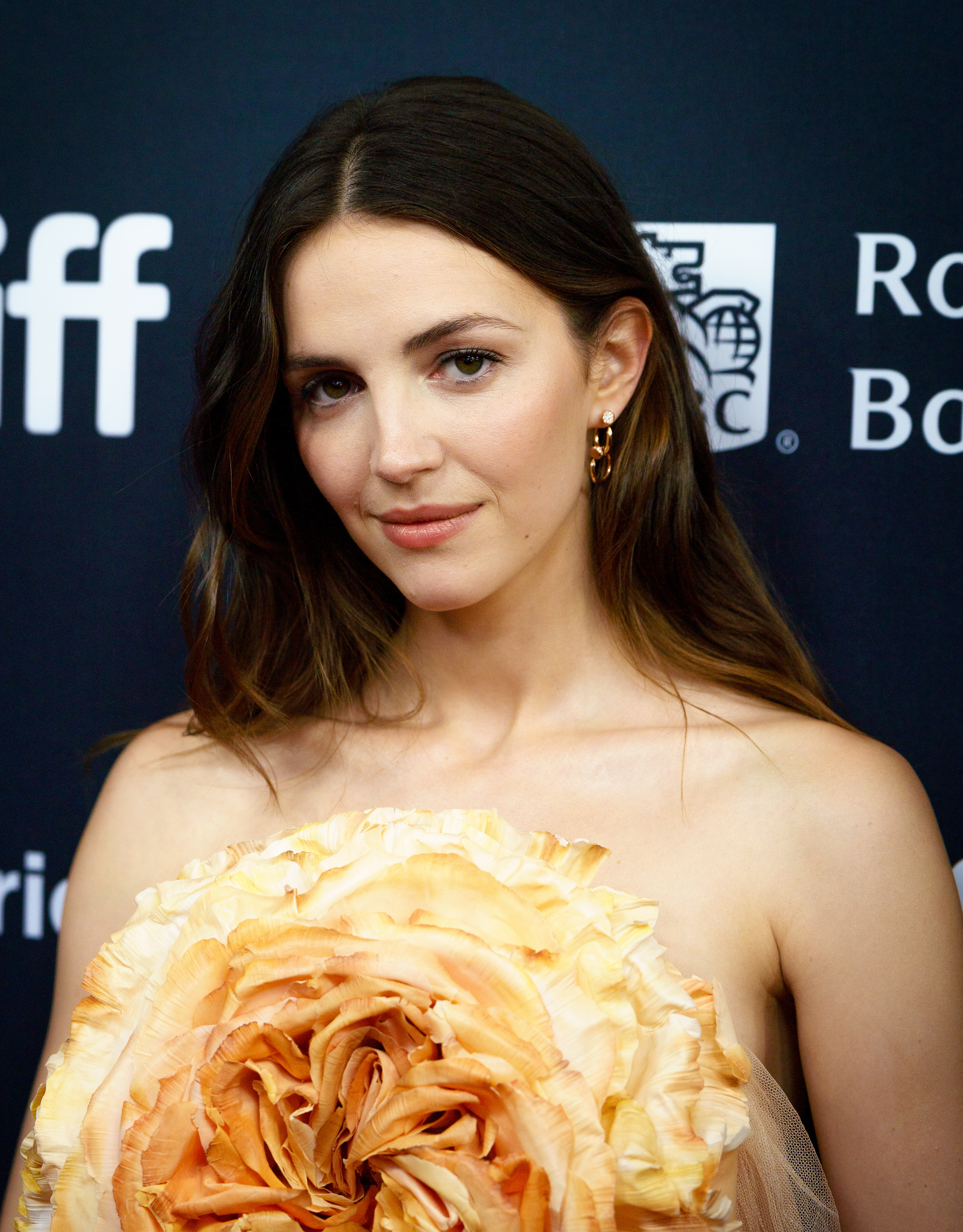
Ella Hunt

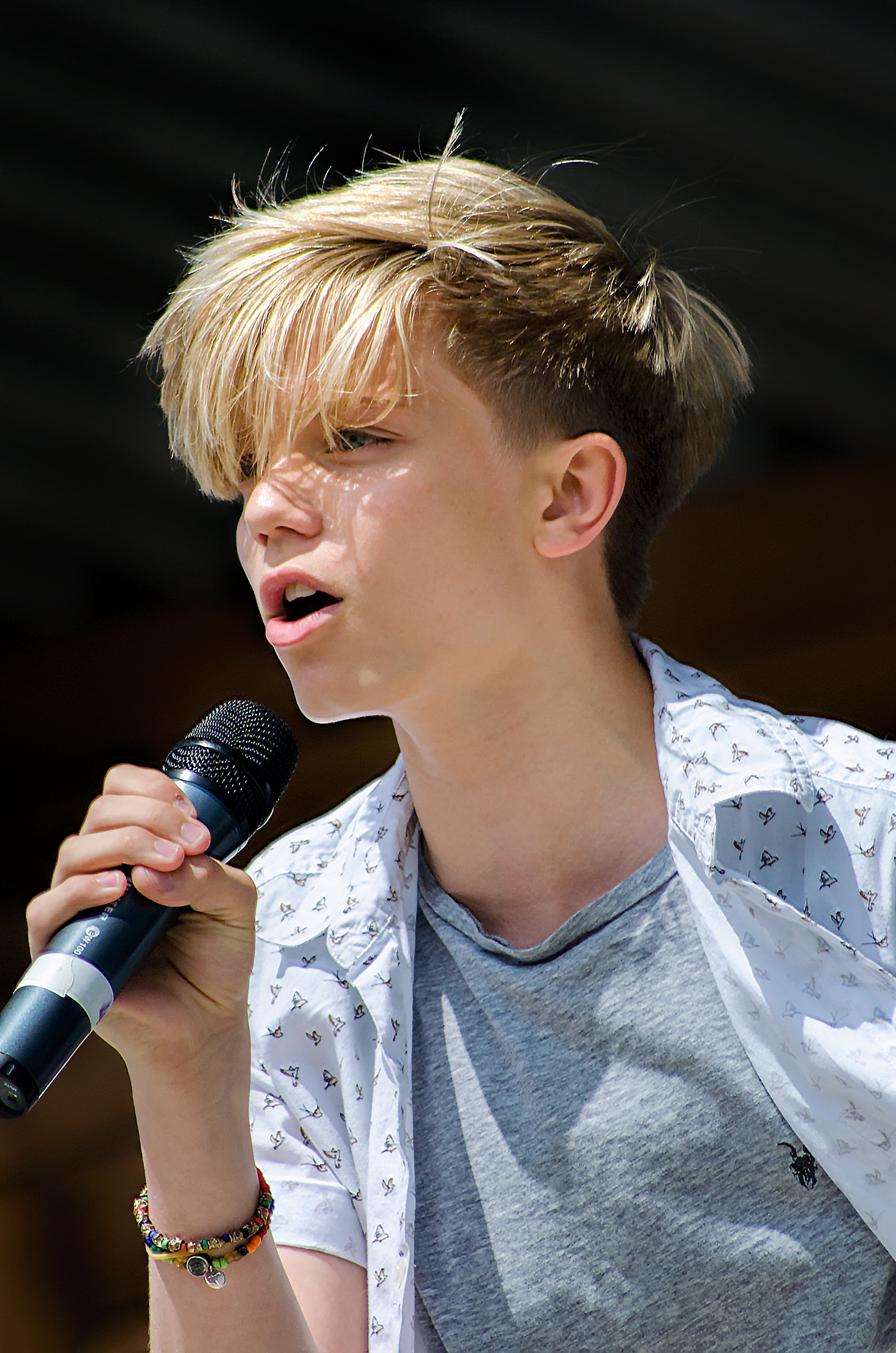
Ronan Parke

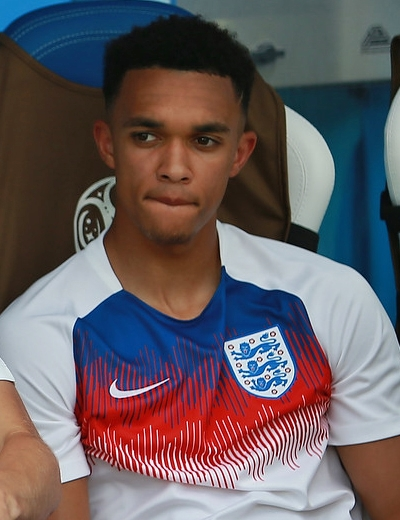
Trent Alexander-Arnold

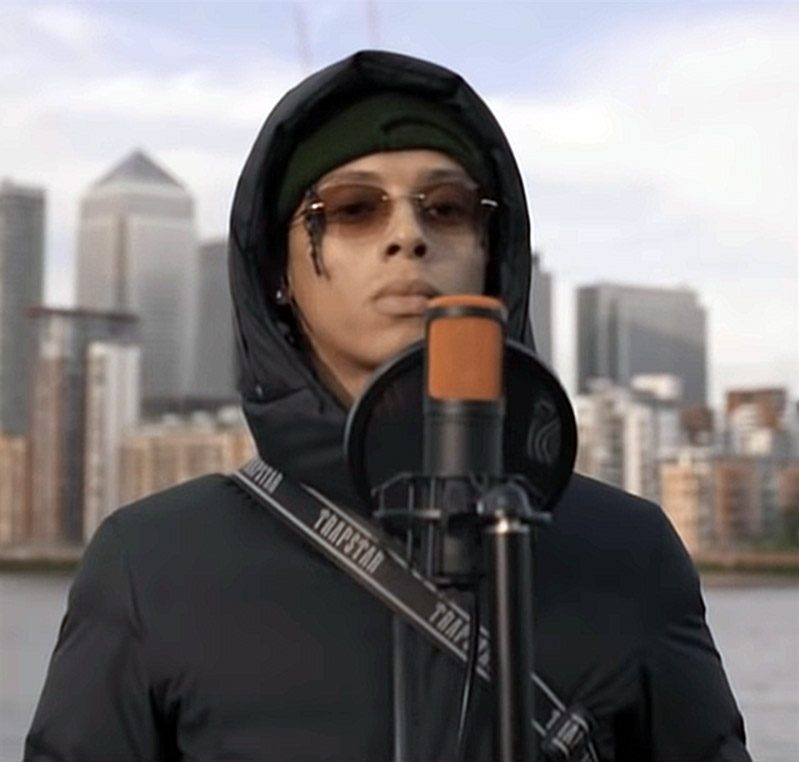
Central Cee

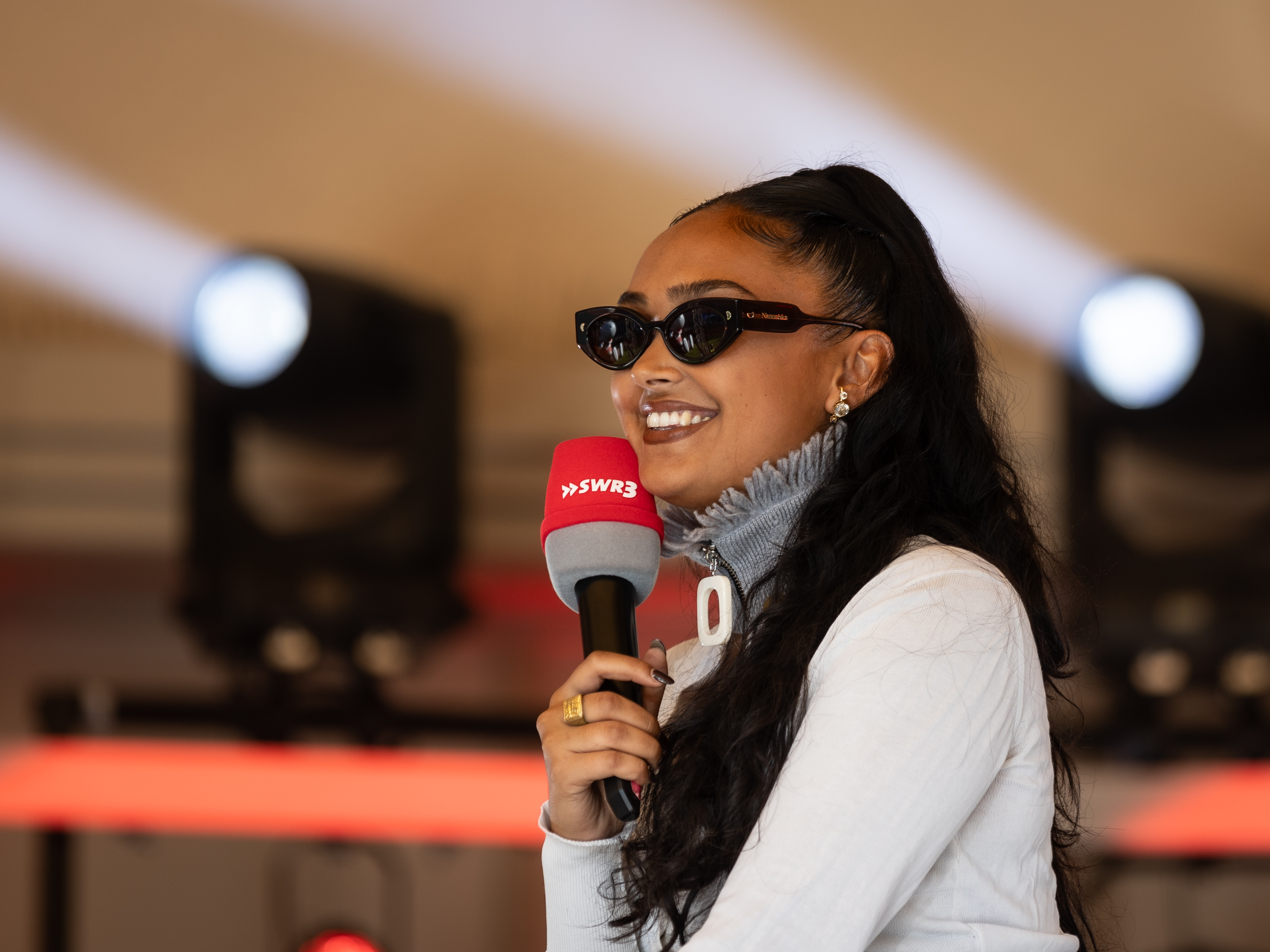
Joy Crookes

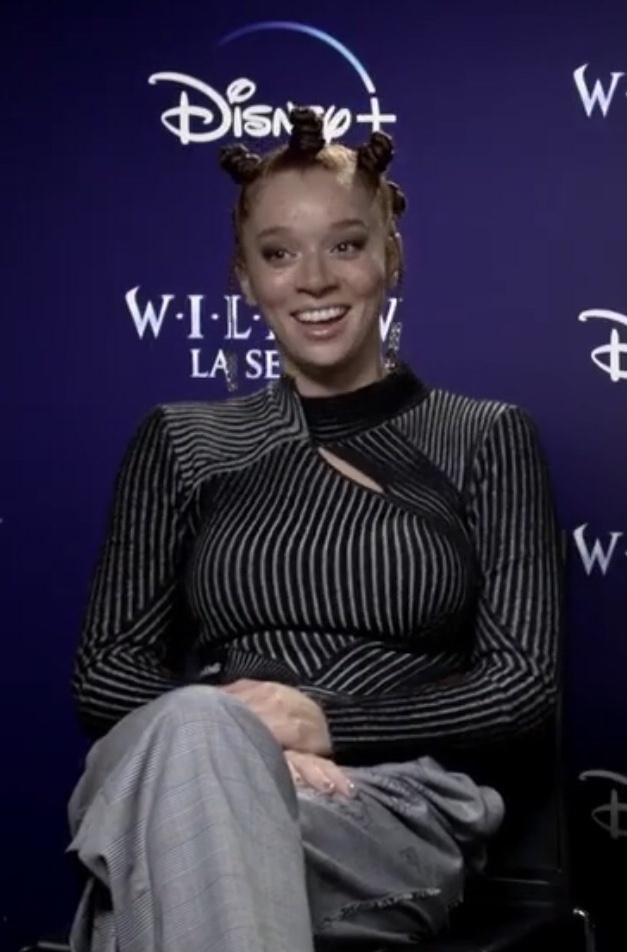
Erin Kellyman

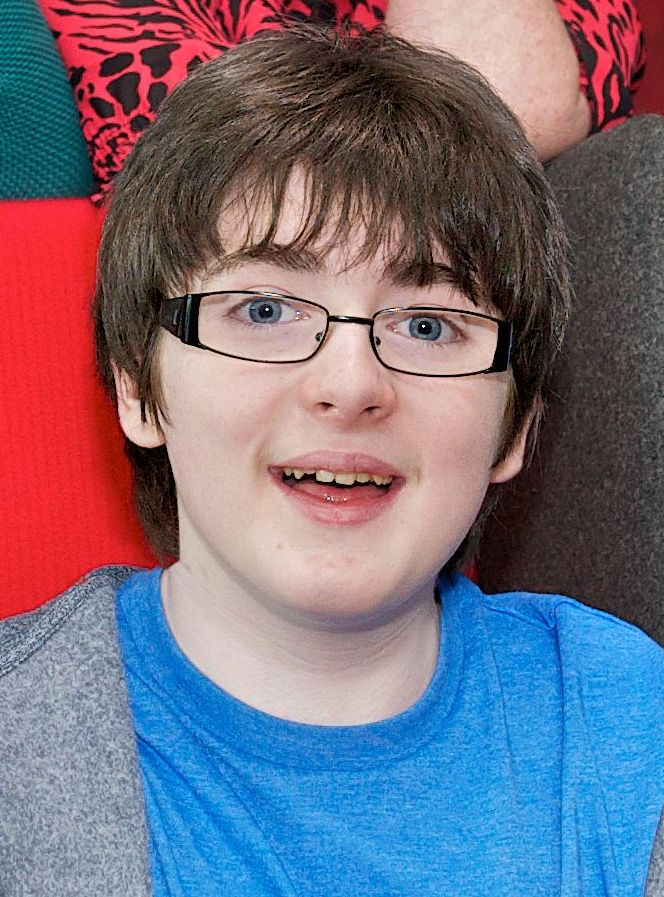
Jack Carroll

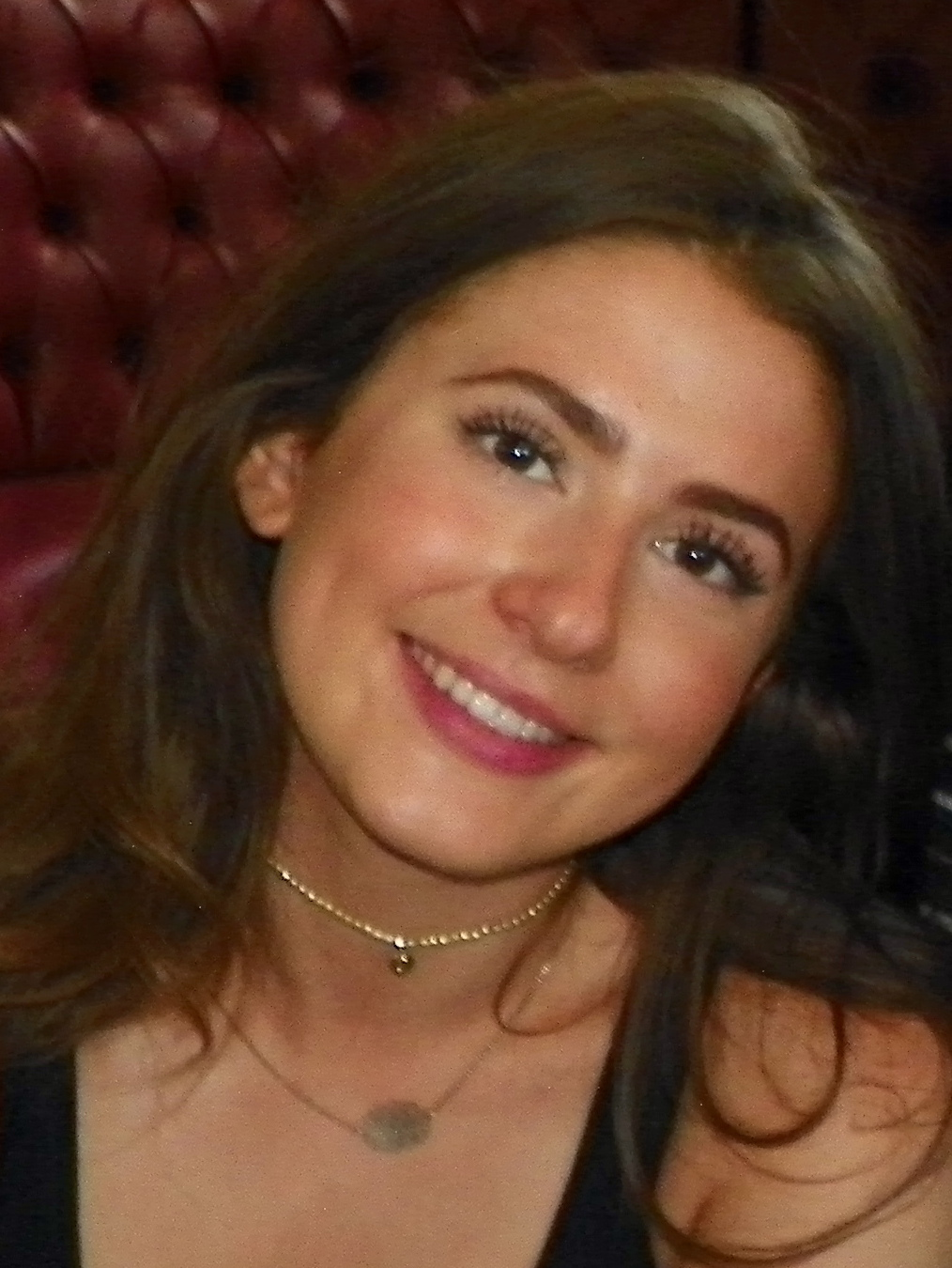
Jasmine Armfield

- 2 January
  - George Miller, footballer
  - Ollie Pope, cricketer
- 4 January – Tia Rigg, murder victim (died 2010)
- 7 January – Ben Earl, rugby union player
- 15 January – Chloe Kelly, footballer
- 18 January – Alfie McIlwain, actor
- 2 February – Chris Smith, footballer
- 3 February – Zak Crawley, cricketer
- 4 February – Scott Jones, athlete
- 15 February – George Russell, racing driver
- 21 February – Ella-Rae Smith, actress and model
- 27 February
  - Sam Smith, footballer
  - Theo Stevenson, actor
- 13 March – Oliver Stokes, actor
- 14 March – George Bartlett, cricketer
- 24 March – Isabel Suckling, singer
- 11 April – Oliver Dillon, actor
- 12 April – Tom Pearce, footballer
- 14 April – Arthur Bowen, actor
- 22 April – Jay Dasilva, footballer
- 29 April – Ella Hunt, actress
- 8 May – Sam Field, footballer
- 14 May – Aaron Ramsdale, footballer
- 3 June – Sam Curran, cricketer.
- 4 June
  - Jack Blatherwick, cricketer
  - Central Cee, rapper
- 7 June – Graham Newberry, American-English figure skater
- 10 June – Johnny Bennett, actor
- 14 June – Julia Joyce, actress
- 21 June – Isabel Atkin, freestyle skier
- 30 June – Tom Davies, footballer
- 1 July – Hollie Steel, classical crossover singer
- 5 July - Georgie Aldous, british social activist, model and influencer
- 19 July
  - Ronaldo Vieira, footballer
  - Amar Virdi, cricketer
  - Lil Woods, actress
- 20 July – Sinead Michael, actress
- 28 July – Sam Surridge, footballer
- 2 August – Giarnni Regini-Moran, artistic gymnast
- 6 August – Jack Scanlon, actor
- 8 August – Ronan Parke, pop singer
- 14 August – Amy Marren, swimmer
- 29 August- Sianna Trebicki, Icon/Legend
- 5 September – Helena Barlow, actress
- 9 September – Shannon Matthews, kidnapping victim
- 21 September – Prem Sisodiya, cricketer
- 2 October – Zack Morris, actor
- 7 October – Trent Alexander-Arnold, footballer
- 17 October – Erin Kellyman, actress
- 18 October – Jack Carroll, comic actor
- 20 October – Jordan Allan, footballer
- 22 October
  - Georgina Anderson, pop singer (died 2013)
  - Harry Souttar, footballer
- 29 October – Matthew Potts, cricketer
- 11 November – Tom Banton, cricketer
- 21 November – Will Jacks, cricketer
- 28 November – Ronan McKenzie, kart racing driver
- 1 December – Ollie Robinson, cricketer
- 3 December – Marcus Edwards, footballer
- 11 December – Gabz (Gabrielle Gardiner), singer-songwriter
- 14 December – Lukas Nmecha, footballer
- 17 December – Jasmine Armfield, actress
- 24 December – Declan McKenna, pop singer

== Deaths ==
=== January ===
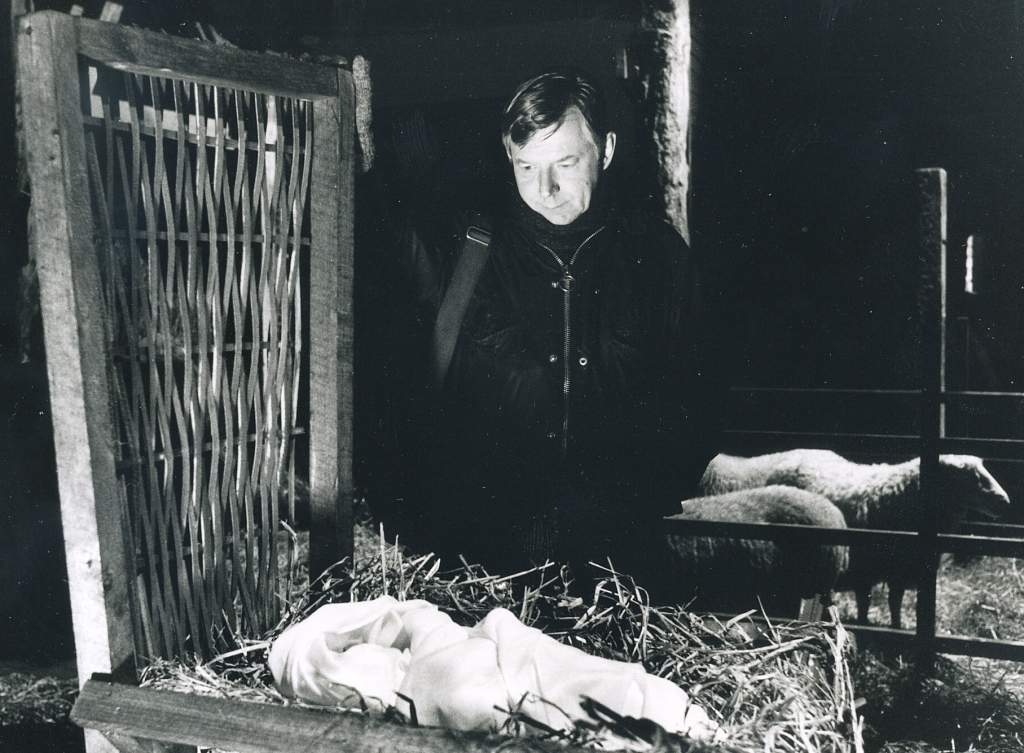
John Wells

- 2 January – Frank Muir, actor, comedy writer and raconteur (born 1920)
- 4 January – Sally Purcell, poet and translator (born 1944)
- 5 January – David Bairstow, English cricketer (born 1951); suicide
- 6 January – Richard Clutterbuck, Army major-general and historian (born 1917)
- 7 January – Frank Roberts, diplomat (born 1907)
- 8 January – Sir Michael Tippett, composer (born 1905)
- 11 January – John Wells, writer and satirist (born 1936)
- 12 January
  - Roger Clark, rally driver (born 1939)
  - Ian Moores, former footballer (born 1954)
- 15 January
  - James Ashley, suspected heroin dealer (born 1958); murdered
  - George Pottinger, convicted fraudster (born 1916)
- 18 January – Monica Edwards, children's writer (born 1912)
- 21 January – Edward Carrick, art designer, writer and illustrator (born 1905)
- 23 January – Victor Pasmore, artist (born 1908)
- 24 January – Xenia Field, councillor, horticulturalist and author (born 1894)
- 25 January – Attia Hosain, novelist, journalist and actress (born 1913, India)
- 26 January – Lord Nicholas Hervey, aristocrat and political activist (born 1961); suicide
- 27 January – Geoffrey Trease, writer (born 1909)
- 30 January – Lesslie Newbigin, theologian and missionary (born 1909)

=== February ===
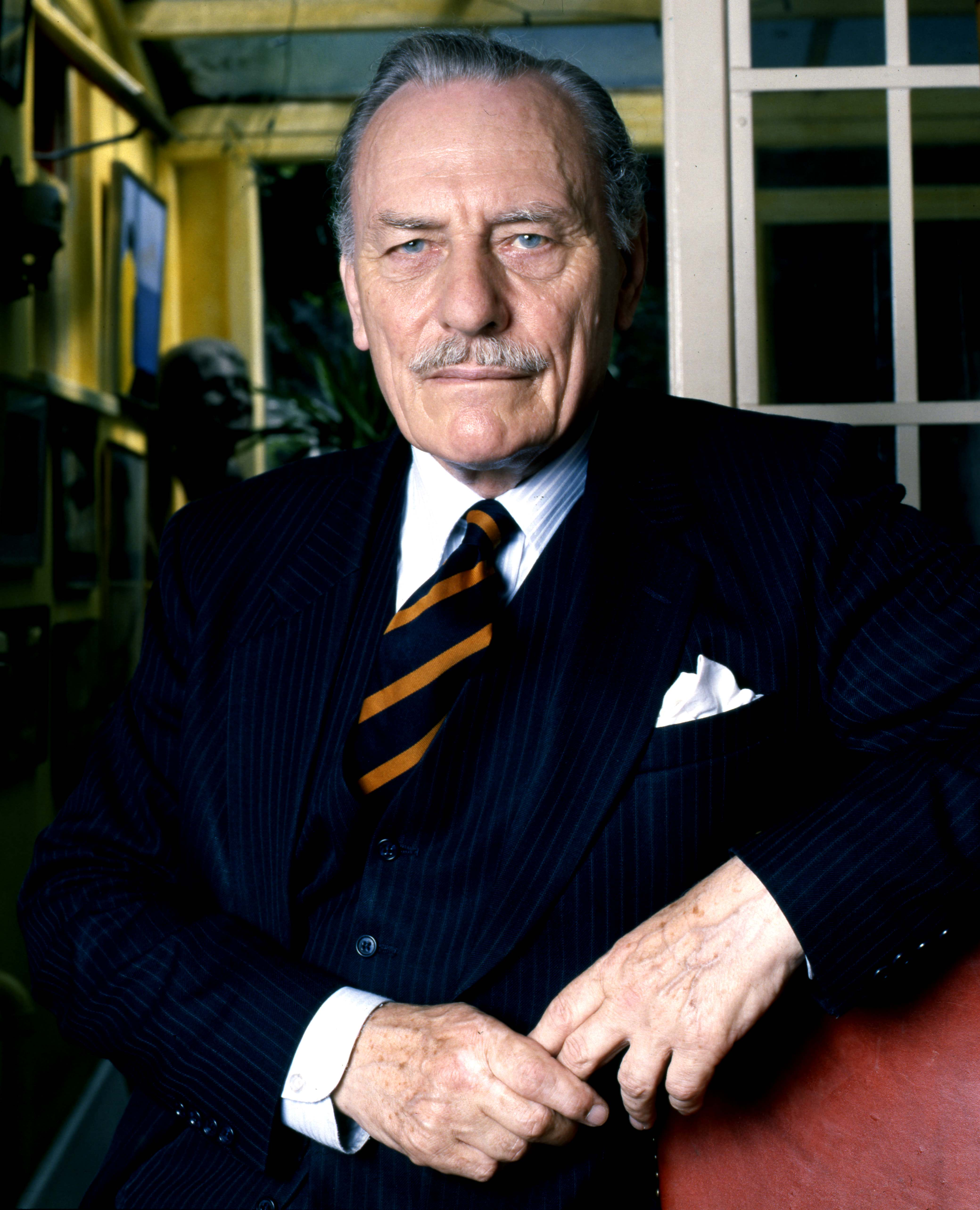
Enoch Powell

- 2 February – Robert McIntyre, Scottish politician (born 1913)
- 3 February – Davy Kaye, actor (born 1916)
- 5 February – Nick Webb, musician (born 1954)
- 8 February – Enoch Powell, politician (born 1912)
- 10 February – Peter Longbottom, cyclist (born 1959); road accident
- 14 February – Edgar Granville, Baron Granville of Eye, politician (born 1898)
- 15 February
  - Samuel Curran, physicist (born 1912)
  - Martha Gellhorn, war correspondent, suicide (born 1908 in the United States)
- 16 February – Harry Hinsley, historian and cryptanalyst (born 1918)
- 17 February – Sheila Raynor, actress (born 1906)
- 18 February – Robbie James, Welsh footballer (born 1957)
- 20 February
  - Francis Coulson, cook and hotelier (born 1919)
  - Henry Livings, playwright and screenwriter (born 1929)
  - David McClure, artist (born 1926)
- 24 February – Geoffrey Bush, composer and music scholar (born 1920)
- 27 February – Martin Hollis, philosopher (born 1938)

=== March ===
- 3 March – Hedley Mattingly, actor (born 1915)
- 6 March – Benjamin Bowden, designer (born 1906)
- 7 March – Bernarr Rainbow, historian of music education, organist, and choir master (born 1941)
- 8 March – Jack Donaldson, Baron Donaldson of Kingsbridge, politician and public servant (born 1907)
- 9 March – Colin Patterson, biologist (born 1933)
- 10 March
  - Ian Dunn, gay and paedophile rights activist, founder of the Scottish Minorities Group (born 1943)
  - Alberto Morrocco, artist (born 1917)
- 13 March – Judge Dread, reggae musician (born 1945)
- 16 March
  - Sir Derek Barton, chemist, Nobel Prize laureate (born 1918)
  - Noel Stephen Paynter, Royal Air Force commodore (born 1898)
- 20 March
  - Beverley Cross, playwright, librettist and screenwriter (born 1931)
  - Laddie Lucas, RAF officer and politician (born 1915)
- 25 March – Daniel Massey, actor (born 1933)
- 27 March – Joan Lestor, Baroness Lestor of Eccles, politician (born 1931)
- 29 March – David Hicks, interior designer (born 1929)

=== April ===
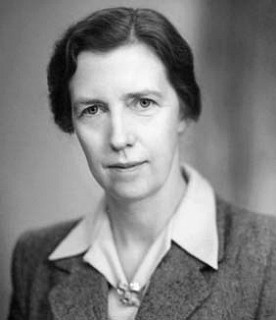
Dame Mary Cartwright

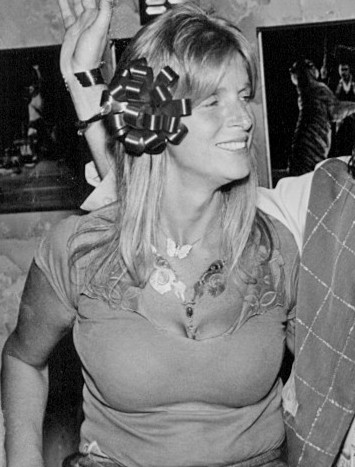
Linda McCartney

- 1 April – Mary Wynne Warner, mathematician (born 1902)
- 2 April – Joan Austin, tennis player (born 1903)
- 3 April – Dame Mary Cartwright, mathematician (born 1900)
- 4 April – Ian Percival, politician (born 1921)
- 5 April
  - Sir Charles Frank, physicist (born 1911, South Africa)
  - Cozy Powell, rock musician (born 1947); car accident
- 7 April
  - Ronald William John Keay, botanist (born 1920)
  - James McIntosh Patrick, painter (born 1907)
- 11 April
  - Francis Durbridge, playwright and author (born 1912)
  - Tex Geddes, author and adventurer (born 1919)
- 14 April
  - Harry Lee, tennis player (born 1907)
  - Dorothy Squires, Welsh singer (born 1915)
- 16 April
  - Fred Davis, snooker and billiards player (born 1913)
  - Ronald Millar, actor and scriptwriter (born 1919)
- 17 April – Linda McCartney, American-born, British-based photographer and musician (born 1941)
- 19 April – Denis Howell, Baron Howell, politician (born 1923)
- 20 April
  - Joan Mary Wayne Brown, British author (b. 1906)
  - Trevor Huddleston, Anglican bishop and anti-apartheid activist (born 1913)
- 21 April – Frank Wootton, aviation artist (born 1911)
- 27 April – Ralph Raphael, organic chemist (born 1921)

=== May ===
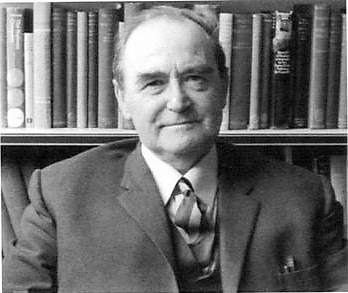
J. S. Roskell

- 1 May – J. S. Roskell, historian (born 1913)
- 2 May
  - Justin Fashanu, footballer (born 1961); suicide
  - Kevin Lloyd, actor (born 1949)
- 3 May – Erika Cheetham, writer (born 1939)
- 4 May – Gordon Beningfield, wildlife artist and naturalist (born 1936)
- 7 May – Jack Heslop-Harrison, soldier and botanist (born 1920)
- 8 May – D. S. L. Cardwell, science historian (born 1919)
- 9 May
  - Bob Mellish, Baron Mellish, politician (born 1913)
  - R. J. G. Savage, palaeontologist (born 1927)
- 14 May
  - Mabel Esther Allan, children's author (born 1915)
  - Geoffrey Kendal, actor (born 1909)
- 15 May – Patrick Wall, World War II marine commando and politician (born 1916)
- 17 May – Hugh Cudlipp, journalist (Daily Mirror) (born 1913)
- 18 May – Enid Marx, artist and designer (born 1902)
- 19 May – Edwin Astley, composer (born 1922)
- 20 May – Wolf Mankowitz, playwright and screenwriter (born 1924)
- 24 May – Charles Rycroft, psychoanalyst (born 1914)
- 28 May – Lana Morris, actress (born 1930)
- 29 May – Marion Milner, psychoanalyst (born 1900)
- 30 May – Walter Carr, actor (born 1925)

=== June ===
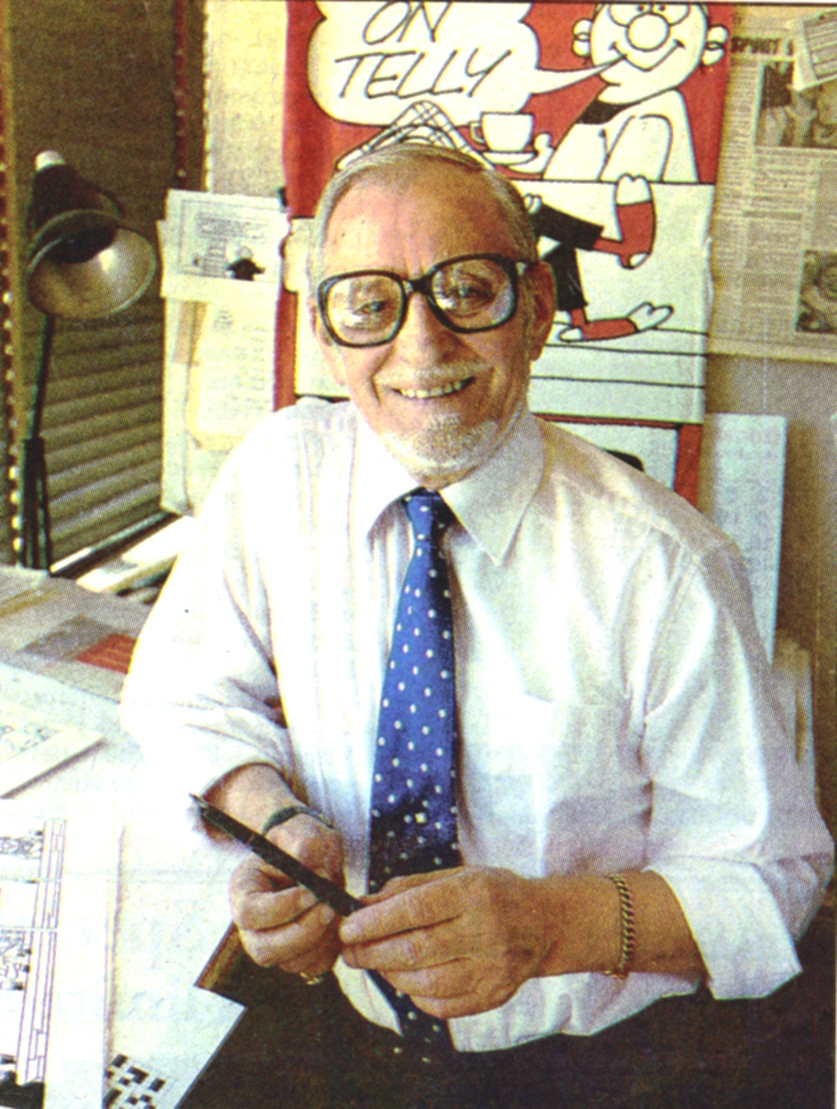
Reg Smythe

- 5 June – Viola Keats, actress (born 1911)
- 10 June
  - Sir David English, journalist and newspaper editor (born 1931)
  - Hammond Innes, author (born 1914)
- 11 June – Catherine Cookson, author (born 1906)
- 13 June
  - Alfred Horace Gerrard, sculptor (born 1899)
  - Kadamba Simmons, actress and model (born 1974); murdered
  - Reg Smythe, cartoonist (Andy Capp) (born 1917)
- 15 June – Morris Kestelman, artist (born 1905)
- 19 June – John Camkin, journalist and sports commentator (born 1922)
- 20 June – Bruno Barnabe, actor (born 1905)
- 21 June – Harry Cranbrook Allen, historian of the United States (born 1917)
- 22 June – Benny Green, writer, radio broadcaster and saxophonist (born 1927)
- 26 June – Derek Rayner, Baron Rayner, businessman, chief executive of Marks & Spencer (1984–1991) (born 1926)
- 28 June – Jack Rowley, English footballer (Manchester United) (born 1918)

=== July ===
- 1 July – Martin Seymour-Smith, poet, literary critic and biographer (born 1928)
- 2 July – Tony De Vit, DJ and music producer (born 1957)
- 3 July
  - George Lloyd, composer (born 1913)
  - Callan Rydz, darts player
- 4 July – Gladys Ambrose, actress (born 1930)
- 5 July
  - Johnny Speight, television scriptwriter (born 1920)
  - Stevie Hyper D, drum and bass MC (born 1966)
- 8 July – Constance Cox, scriptwriter and playwright (born 1912)
- 9 July
  - David Fulker, geneticist (born 1937)
  - Katherine Russell, social worker and university teacher (born 1909)
- 11 July – John Boyd-Carpenter, Baron Boyd-Carpenter, politician (born 1908)
- 14 July
  - Beryl Bryden, jazz singer (born 1920)
  - Angus John Mackintosh Stewart, writer (born 1936)
- 17 July – James Lighthill, mathematician (born 1924)
- 18 July – Betty Marsden, comedy actress (born 1919)
- 21 July – Kenneth Watson, actor (born 1931)
- 22 July – Michael Denison, actor (born 1915)
- 23 July – John Hopkins, screenwriter (born 1931); accidentally killed in the United States
- 25 July – Tiny Rowland, businessman (born 1917)
- 27 July – Binnie Barnes, actress (born 1903)
- 28 July – Lenny McLean, boxer and actor (born 1949)

=== August ===
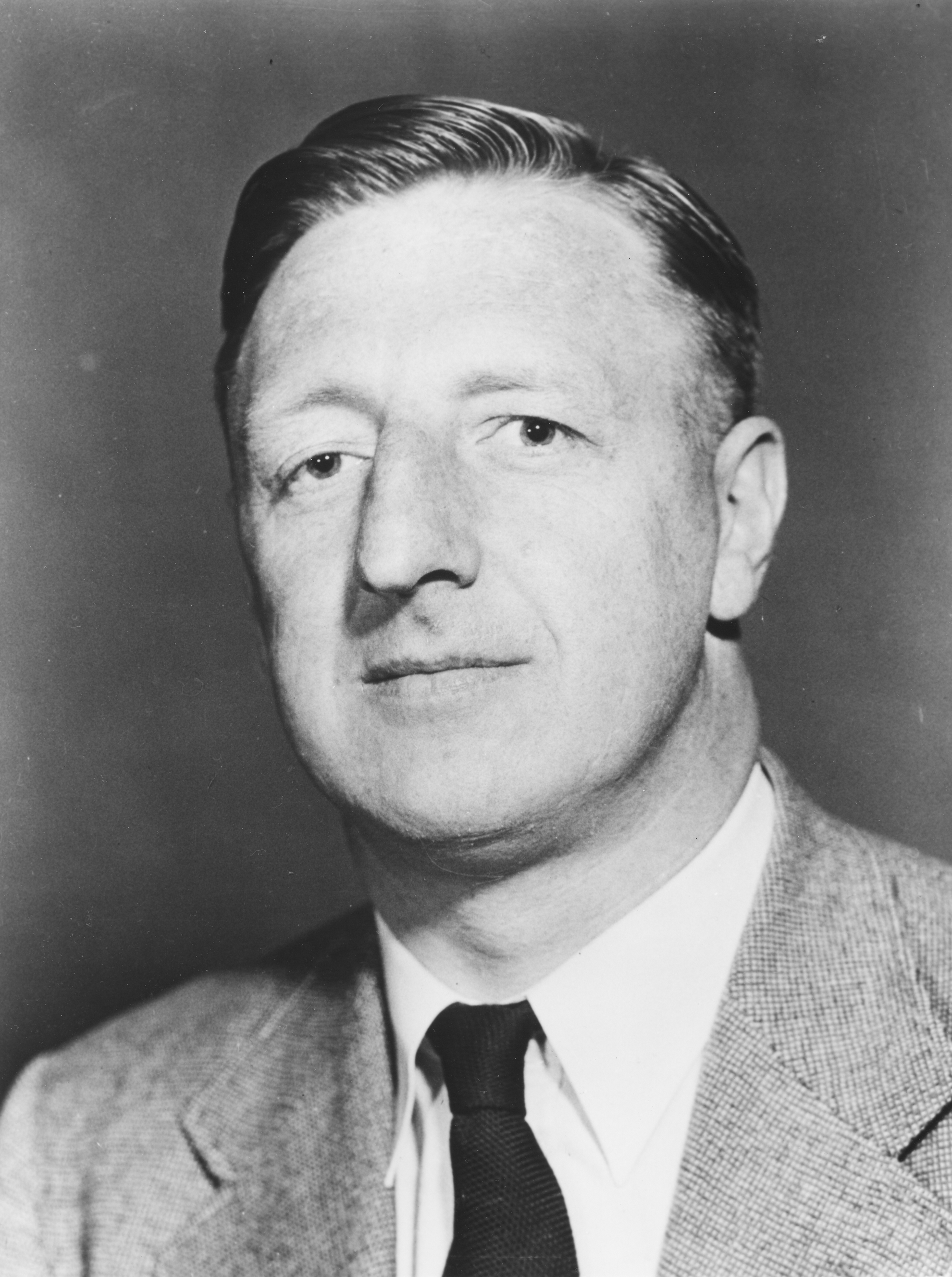
Alan Walsh

- 1 August – Eva Bartok, actress (born 1927, Hungary)
- 3 August – Alan Walsh, physicist, developer of atomic absorption spectroscopy (born 1913)
- 4 August – Richard Dunn, CEO of Thames Television (born 1943)
- 6 August – Nat Gonella, jazz trumpeter, bandleader and vocalist (born 1908)
- 7 August – Sir Harry Tuzo, Army general (born 1917)
- 9 August – George Child Villiers, 9th Earl of Jersey, peer (born 1910)
- 11 August – Derek Newark, actor (born 1933)
- 14 August – Rosemary Martin, actress (born 1936)
- 19 August – Anne Asquith, Countess of Oxford and Asquith, code breaker in World War II (born 1916, France)
- 22 August
  - Evelyn Denington, Baroness Denington, politician (born 1907)
  - Jimmy Skidmore, jazz saxophonist (born 1916)
- 25 August
  - Allan Macartney, Scottish politician (born 1941)
  - Barbara Mandell, journalist, broadcaster, newsreader and travel writer (born 1920)
- 26 August – Margaret Potter, writer (born 1926)

=== September ===
- 1 September – Vere Harmsworth, 3rd Viscount Rothermere, peer and newspaper proprietor (born 1925)
- 2 September
  - Roy Bradford, politician (born 1921)
  - Jackie Blanchflower, footballer (born 1933)
- 4 September
  - Charles Kemball, chemist (born 1923)
  - Lal Waterson, folk singer-songwriter (born 1943)
- 7 September – Sir John Osler Chattock Hayes, Royal Navy admiral (born 1913)
- 10 September
  - Carl Forgione, actor (born 1944)
  - Sir Frederick Rosier, Royal Air Force commander (born 1915)
- 13 September – Sir Denys Buckley, lawyer and judge (born 1906)
- 17 September
  - April FitzLyon, translator, biographer and historian (born 1920)
  - Celia Rooke, artist (born 1902)
- 19 September
  - Susan Barrantes, filmmaker and mother of the former Duchess of York (born 1937); killed in car accident
  - Patricia Hayes, character actress (born 1909)
  - Ran Laurie, physician and Olympic rowing champion, father of Hugh Laurie (born 1915)
- 21 September – Margaret Allan, racing driver (born 1909)
- 22 September – Doug Smith, rugby union player (born 1924)
- 23 September – Ray Bowden, footballer (born 1909)
- 28 September – Joan Maude, actress (born 1908)
- 30 September – Marius Goring, actor (born 1912)

=== October ===
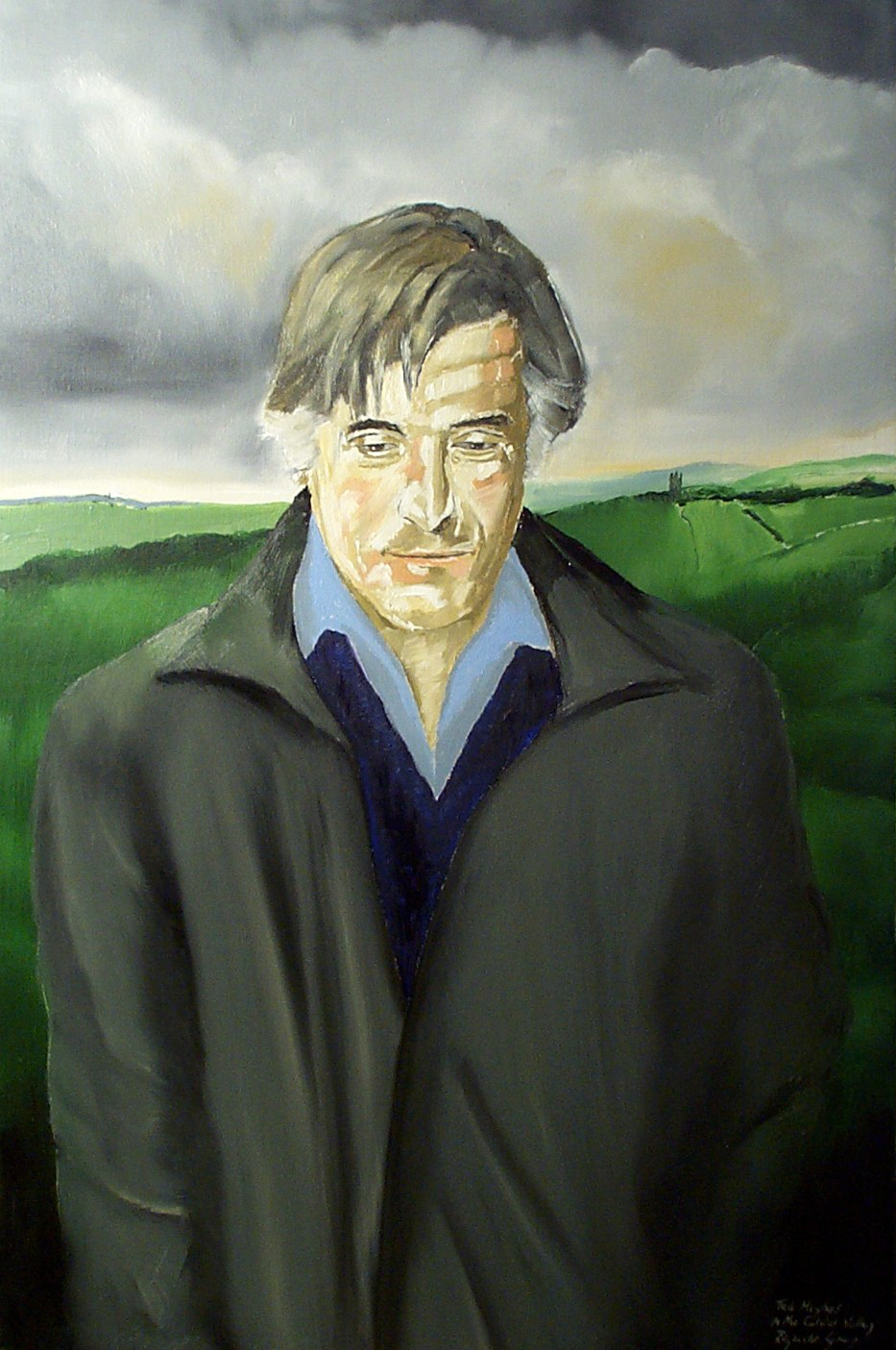
Ted Hughes

- 2 October
  - Raymond Raikes, theatre producer, director and broadcaster (born 1910)
  - Sir Richard Way, civil servant, chief executive of London Transport (1970–1974) (born 1914)
- 3 October – Roddy McDowall, actor (born 1928)
- 5 October – Megs Jenkins, character actress (born 1917)
- 6 October – Joseph J. Sandler, psychoanalyst (born 1927)
- 8 October – Curtis Cassell, rabbi (born 1912, German Empire)
- 10 October – Jackie Forster, journalist and lesbian rights activist (born 1926)
- 11 October – Michael Wynn, 7th Baron Newborough, peer and World War II naval veteran (born 1917)
- 15 October – Iain Crichton Smith, Scottish poet and novelist (born 1928)
- 17 October – Joan Hickson, actress (born 1906)
- 20 October – Frank Gillard, radio broadcaster (born 1909)
- 21 October
  - Sir Alexander Cairncross, economist (born 1911)
  - Alan Sainsbury, Baron Sainsbury, businessman (born 1902)
- 22 October – Eric Ambler, novelist and playwright (born 1909)
- 23 October – Christopher Gable, ballet dancer, choreographer and actor (born 1940)
- 24 October – Dennis Ayling, cinematographer (born 1917)
- 25 October – Susan Strange, political scientist (born 1923)
- 27 October – Rosamund John, actress (born 1913)
- 28 October
  - Cuthbert Alport, Baron Alport, politician (born 1912)
  - Tommy Flowers, electrical engineer (born 1905)
  - Ted Hughes, poet laureate and children's writer (born 1930)

=== November ===
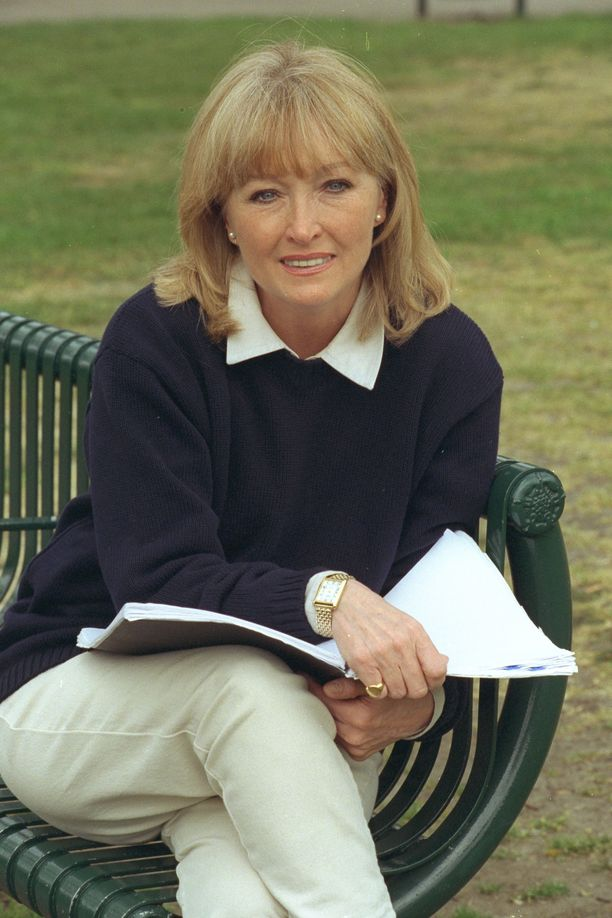
Mary Millar

- 2 November
  - Janet Arnold, costume designer (born 1932)
  - Vincent Winter, child film actor (born 1947)
- 7 November
  - Margaret Gowing, historian (born 1921)
  - John Hunt, Baron Hunt, World War II army officer and leader of the 1953 British Mount Everest Expedition (born 1910)
- 8 November – Rumer Godden, writer (born 1907)
- 10 November
  - Peter Cotes, actor, writer and director (born 1912)
  - Mary Millar, actress (born 1936)
- 12 November – Roy Hollis, footballer (born 1925)
- 13 November – Doug Wright, English cricketer (b. 1914)
- 14 November
  - Eli Cashdan, rabbi (born 1905)
  - Quentin Crewe, journalist, author and adventurer (born 1926)
- 18 November – Robin Hall, folk singer (born 1926)
- 19 November – Ken Gatward, RAF pilot of World War II (born 1914)
- 24 November – John Chadwick, linguist (born 1920)
- 26 November – Mike Calvert, Army officer (born 1913)
- 29 November
  - Robin Ray, broadcaster, actor and musician (born 1934)
  - Martin Ruane, British professional wrestler (b. 1947)

=== December ===
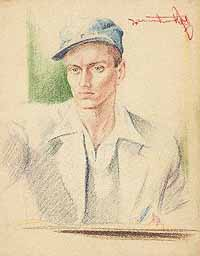
Brian Stonehouse

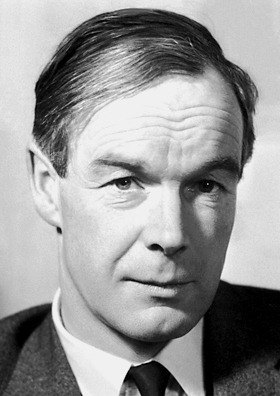
Alan Lloyd Hodgkin

- 1 December – Freddie Young, cinematographer (born 1902)
- 2 December – Brian Stonehouse, painter and World War II secret agent (born 1918)
- 3 December – George Murcell, character actor (born 1925)
- 7 December – John Addison, composer (born 1920)
- 8 December – Michael Craze, actor (born 1942)
- 13 December
  - Lew Grade, showbusiness impresario and television company executive (born 1906 in Ukraine)
  - Sir Richard Thomas, Royal Navy admiral and Black Rod (1992–1995) (born 1932)
- 17 December – John Burns Brooksby, veterinarian (born 1914)
- 20 December – Alan Lloyd Hodgkin, scientist, recipient of the Nobel Prize in Physiology or Medicine (born 1914)
- 21 December
  - Roger Avon, actor (born 1914)
  - Avril Coleridge-Taylor, pianist, conductor, composer and daughter of Samuel Coleridge-Taylor (born 1903)
  - Karl Denver, singer (born 1931)
  - Sir Richard Turnbull, British colonial governor (b. 1909)
- 22 December – Donald Soper, Methodist minister and pacifist (born 1903)
- 25 December – John Pulman, snooker player (born 1923); accidentally killed
- 26 December – Michael Sherard, fashion designer (born 1910)
- 27 December – Ralegh Radford, historian (born 1900)
- 30 December – George Webb, actor (born 1911)
- 31 December – Alan Morris, English footballer (born 1954); murdered

== See also ==
- List of British films of 1998
