= Joan Curran =

Welsh physicist (1916–1999)

- Joan Curran at Newnham College
- Born: Joan Elizabeth Strothers; 26 February 1916; Swansea, Wales
- Died: 10 February 1999 (aged 82); Glasgow, Scotland
- Education: Newnham College of University of Cambridge (B.A., M.A.)
- Known for: Invention of chaff Work on proximity fuses
- Spouse: Sir Samuel Curran (m. 1940)
- Awards: Honorary degree of Doctor of Laws by the University of Strathclyde
- Scientific career
- Workplaces: Cavendish Laboratory; Telecommunications Research Establishment; Lawrence Berkeley National Laboratory

Joan, Lady Curran (born Joan Elizabeth Strothers; 26 February 1916 – 10 February 1999) was a Welsh physicist who played important roles in the development of radar and the atomic bomb during the Second World War. She devised a method of releasing chaff, a radar countermeasure technique credited with reducing losses among Allied bomber crews. She also worked on the development of the proximity fuse and the electromagnetic isotope separation process for the atomic bomb.

In 1954 she became a founding member of the Scottish Society for the Parents of Mentally Handicapped Children.

== Early life ==
Joan Elizabeth Strothers was born on 26 February 1916 in Swansea, Wales, the daughter of an optician, Charles William Strothers, and his wife, Margaret Beatrice, née Millington. She was educated at Swansea Girls' High School, and in 1934 won an open scholarship to Newnham College, Cambridge. In 1935, she rowed for the ladies' university eight, in the first real Women's boat race against Oxford. She gained an honours degree in physics, mailed to her as a certificate: before the unanimously agreed change to the rules in December 1947 to confer full membership, women were 'denied the honour of graduating with a full Cambridge degree that would make them members of the university.' In her seventies, in 1987, she was honoured with the degree of Doctor of Laws honoris causa by the University of Strathclyde.

Strothers, who "had the scientific equivalent of gardening green fingers", was awarded a government grant to study for a higher degree, and elected to go to the Cavendish Laboratory at Cambridge, where she joined Sam Curran in a team under the direction of Philip Dee. She soon established a reputation for "extreme dexterity and being outstandingly neat and skilful in the deployment of equipment." In 1939, Dee proposed that the team spend a month at the Royal Aircraft Establishment at Farnborough Airfield. They arrived on 1 September 1939. Two days later, Britain declared war on Germany and thus entered the Second World War.

== Second World War ==
Instead of returning to the Cavendish, the team moved to Exeter, where Dee and three others worked on developing rockets as anti-aircraft weapons, while Strothers and Curran joined a group under John Coles working on the development of the proximity fuse. Strothers was based at Leeson House and Durnford School. She and Curran developed a workable fuse, which was codenamed VT, an acronym of "Variable Time fuse". The system was a small, short-range, Doppler radar that used a clever circuit. However, Britain lacked the capacity to mass-produce the fuse, so the design was shown to the United States by the Tizard Mission in late 1940. The Americans perfected and mass-produced the fuse. In due course, these proximity fuses arrived in the United Kingdom, where they played an important part in the defence of the kingdom against the V-1 flying bomb.

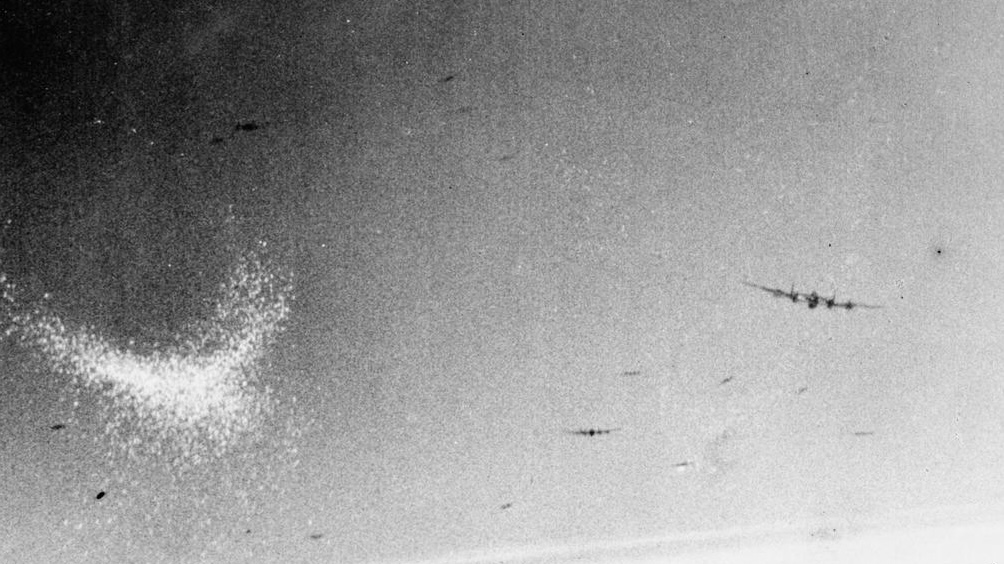
A Lancaster dropping chaff (the crescent-shaped white cloud on the left of the picture) over Essen during a thousand-bomber raid

Strothers married Curran on 7 November 1940. Soon afterwards they were transferred to the Telecommunications Research Establishment near Swanage, where Sam worked on centimetric radar, while Joan joined the Counter Measures Group in an adjoining lab. It was with this group, at Swanage, and later at Malvern, that Joan devised the technique that was codenamed Window, which is also known as chaff. She tried various types of radar reflectors, including wires and sheets, before settling on strips of tin foil 1 to 2 centimetres (0.39 to 0.79 in) wide and 25 centimetres (9.8 in) long that could be scattered from bombers, thus disrupting the enemy's radar. Window was first employed in Operation Gomorrah, a series of raids on Hamburg, and resulted in a much lower loss rate than usual. As part of Operation Taxable on 5–6 June 1944, Window was dropped by Avro Lancasters of 617 Squadron to synthesise a phantom invasion force of ships in the Straits of Dover and keep the Germans unsure as to whether the brunt of the Allied assault would fall on Normandy or in the Pas de Calais area. R. V. Jones later declared: "In my opinion, Joan Curran made an even greater contribution to victory, in 1945, than Sam."

In early 1944 the Currans were part of a group of British scientists invited to go to the US to take part in the Manhattan Project – the Allied project to develop an atomic bomb. They joined the British Mission at the Berkeley Radiation Laboratory in California, headed by Mark Oliphant, a distinguished Australian scientist that Joan knew from the Cavendish Laboratory. Oliphant also acted as de facto deputy to Ernest Lawrence, the director of the Radiation Laboratory. The mission of the laboratory was to develop the electromagnetic isotope separation process to create enriched uranium for use in atomic bombs.

While at Berkeley, Joan gave birth to her first child, a daughter, Sheena, who was born severely mentally handicapped. They later had three sons, all of whom went on to complete a PhD.

== Later life ==
After the war ended, Sam took up an offer from Dee to become Professor of Natural Philosophy at Glasgow University. In Glasgow, the Currans, together with a few friends, in 1954 set up the Scottish Society for the Parents of Mentally Handicapped Children (Enable), which eventually grew to 100 branches and more than 5000 members. Later, when Joan was a member of the Greater Glasgow Health Board and the Scottish Special Housing Association, the needs of the disabled were always at the forefront of her mind, and she did much to promote their welfare. She took a close interest in the work of the Council for Access for the Disabled and helped improve the range of facilities, especially for disabled university students.

Sam worked at the Atomic Weapons Research Establishment at Aldermaston on the development of the British hydrogen bomb from 1955 to 1959. He returned to Glasgow in 1959 as principal of the Royal College of Science and Technology. When it became the University of Strathclyde in 1964, the first new university in Scotland in 384 years, he became its first Principal and Vice Chancellor. While her husband was Principal, Joan founded the Strathclyde Women's Group and became its president. Joan Curran was awarded an honorary degree of Doctor of Letters from the University of Strathclyde in 1987.

During the war the Polish 1st Armoured Division had been based in Scotland, establishing ties between the community and Poland. Joan promoted a special relationship with the Technical University of Lodz, and also devoted care and attention to the children's hospital of that city. Later she established the Lady Curran Endowment fund for overseas, particularly Polish, students.

Sam died on 25 February 1998. While gravely ill with cancer in 1998, Joan unveiled a memorial plaque in Barony Hall, Glasgow, to commemorate her husband, and it was announced that the walled garden at Ross Priory, on Loch Lomondside, was to be named in her honour, and the Joan Curran Summer House would be built there. Joan died on 10 February 1999, and was cremated at the Daldowie Crematorium. Her daughter, Sheena, three sons and three grandsons survived her.

== Commemoration ==
In 2025, Curran was one of ten women "who played vital roles during World War II" to be commemorated in a silhouette statue created by Standing with Giants for the Women of War exhibition at Lincoln's International Bomber Command Centre.
