= Alkali sulfur liquid battery =

Liquid battery

- Specific energy: 180–190 Wh/kg
- Energy density: 220–240 Wh/L
- Charge/discharge efficiency: 93.15-96.8%
- Time durability: 20-30 years
- Cycle durability: >16,000-20,000 cycles
- Nominal cell voltage: 2.05–2.85 V

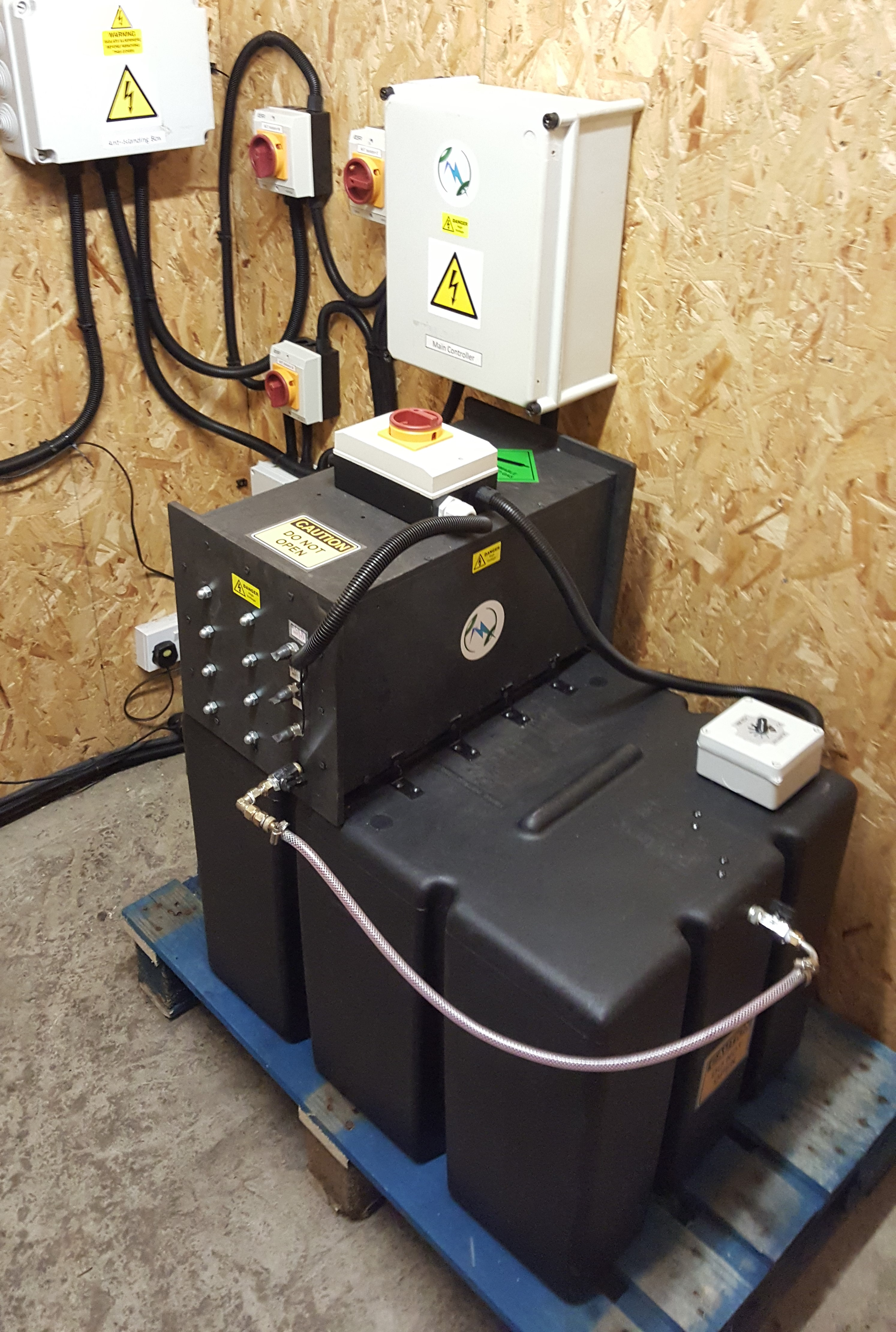
Worlds's first SLIQ battery installation

Alkaline sulfur liquid battery is a single liquid flow battery which consists of only one rechargeable liquid and a technology which can be used for grid storage.

== Battery chemistry and active material ==
One of the most promising possibilities of enhancing battery energy storage is to use sulphur as the positive electrode. Lithium-sulphur batteries are a tempting solution due to sulphur having a high theoretical capacity (1675 mAh g-1), as well as being non-toxic, abundant, and very low in cost. The discharge reaction in a lithium-sulphur cell, when using elemental sulphur as the positive electrode, can be written in its simplified form below:

S_{8}+16 Li →8Li_{2}S

In reality, the reactions taking place are much more complicated and occur through several intermediates, collectively known as polysulphides. For the charging or discharging reactions to take place, carbon must be present as a catalytic current collector, allowing electrons to pass through. Carbon is used as a three-phase interphase, giving a site where sulphur or polysulphides, lithium ions and electrons can all interact in one step. This greatly increases the rate of reaction, making lithium-sulphur cells a practical possibility not just a theoretical one. For a long time, the exact nature of the intermediate reactions during the charging or discharging of the cell were left up to speculation, due to the highly reactive nature of lithium polysulphides. This high reactivity makes it almost impossible to perform any type of analysis on the substrates, as they inevitably degrade within seconds. SLIQ battery closely resembles the voltage profile and the gravimetric capacity of a lithium sulfur battery cell. SLIQ battery has four discrete stages during discharge. The capacity Vs voltage plot of a SLIQ battery is shown below which clearly shows these four discrete stages during discharging.

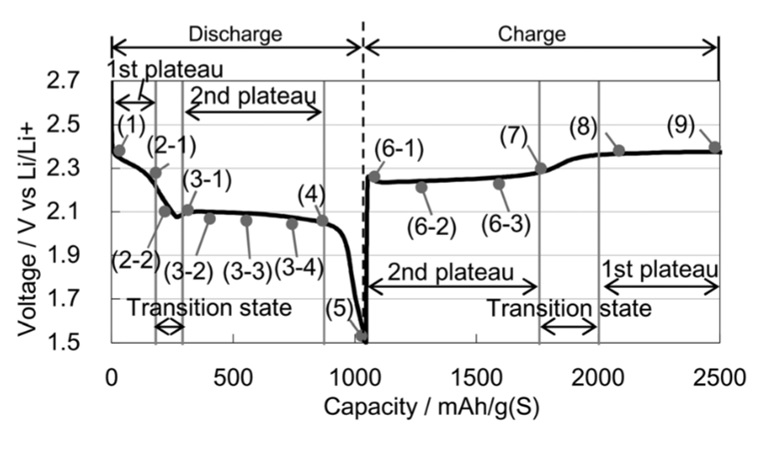

The first stage occurs between the voltages of 2.4 V and 2.1 V, with the sharp drop in voltage against capacity between 2.3 V and 2.1 V representing the second stage. The third stage is gently sloping plateau between 2.1 V and 2.05 V before the second sharp drop that is the fourth stage, occurring between 2.05 V – 1.5 V. Reactions taking place in each stage of the discharge are listed below;

Primary stage of reactions are:

S_{8} + 2e^{−} → S_{8}^{2-}

S_{8} + 4e^{−} → S_{7}^{2-} + S^{2-}

S_{8} + 4e^{−} → S_{6}^{2-} + S_{2}^{2-}

S_{8} + 4e^{−} → S_{5}^{2-} + S_{3}^{2-}

S_{8} + 4e^{−} → 2S_{4}^{2-}

Secondary stage of reactions are;

S_{8}^{2-} + 2e^{−} → S_{6}^{2-} + S_{2}^{2-}

S_{8}^{2-} + 2e^{−} → S_{5}^{2-} + S_{3}^{2-}

S_{8}^{2-} + 2e^{−}→ 2S_{4}^{2-}

S_{7}^{2-} + 2e^{−} → S_{5}^{2-} + S_{3}^{2-}

S_{6}^{2-} + 2e^{−} → 2S_{3}^{2-}

S_{5}^{2-} + 2e^{−} → S_{3}^{2-} + S_{2}^{2-}

S_{4}^{2-} + 2e^{−} → 2S_{2}^{2-}

The third stage of reactions are;

S_{3}^{2-} + 2e^{−} → S_{2}^{2-} + S^{2-}

The fourth stage of reactions are;

S_{2}^{2-} + 2e^{−} → 2S^{2-}

Longer chain polysulphides (Li_{2}S_{x}, where 4 ≤x≤ 8) are mainly generated in the first stage with a smaller contribution being made by the second stage. This is important to note, as longer chain polysulphides are responsible for one of the main issues in lithium sulphur cells: polysulphide shuttling. SLIQ has been developed by solving the polysulphide shuttling issue using chemical, electrical and mechanical methods.

The third and fourth stages of the discharge are where S^{2-} is produced. This molecule is known as an insulating product (Li_{2}S), and the formation of it can cause a passivation layer on the electrode, causing the sulphur to be under-utilised. The passivation layer conducts electrons even more poorly than elemental sulphur, a known insulator, so the sulphur must migrate to the current collector surface in order to react. The passivation layer further interferes with this process as Li_{2}S does not easily conduct elemental sulphur (S_{8}), making the reaction kinetics very sluggish. SLIQ technology has been developed providing practical solutions to solve these known problems.

In this battery technology, the electrolyte and part of the cathode is converted to continuously refreshing and free flowing liquid, making this a different battery variant while solving some of the inherent problems explained above. The result is a refreshing polysulfide redox single liquid battery (SLIQ). In addition to low cost, the SLIQ has high energy density, millisecond response time due to the use of Li-S chemistry and longer lifetime due to flushing and dosing techniques. The power and energy are independently scalable giving complete flexibility. The size of the power stack defines the power of the battery and the amount of the liquid in the tank defines the battery capacity. High DC-DC efficiency of (96.8%) has been demonstrated by the first demonstrator installed at Inverie on the Knoydart peninsula in Scotland, UK. Technologies such as the SLIQ are crucial to fight the present climate crisis.

== Performance ==
A BEIS Report describes this technology as a novel flow battery technology that is low-cost, long-lasting and easily scalable. The alkaline sulfur liquid battery has several advantages, including simplicity, low cost, durability, a long lifetime, and thermal stability (no thermal runaway). The long lifetime is due to the continuous refreshing of the internal electrolytes and the catholyte. This technology also has a low carbon footprint per kWh of energy storage medium. It also eliminates the need for rare earth minerals for storage. These features make it applicable for transportation systems.

A demonstrator which has been operational since 2017 has shown an overall AC-AC roundtrip efficiency of 93.15%, which is comparatively higher other comparable battery storage systems with online references. This technology is based on lithium-sulfur battery technology which have a high theoretical energy density of 2600 Wh kg^{−1} and theoretical energy capacity of 1675 mAh g^{−1}. Therefore, the theoretical energy density and theoretical energy capacity of SLIQ technology can be very close to 2600 Wh kg^{−1} and 1675 mAh g^{−1} respectively. This alkali sulphur liquid battery has been chosen to be included in an ARPA-E report on ‘The Cost and Performance Requirements for “Flexible” Advanced Nuclear Plants in Future Power Markets’ published in the official ARPA-E website. This ARPA-E report indicates that the SLIQ technology has a cost lower than $94/kWh with a lifetime exceeding 20 years, which makes this technology a definite candidate as an electrical storage technology for the fight against climate crisis.

== Invention and awards ==
The Single Liquid battery or the Alkali sulfur liquid battery was invented in 2013 by Pasidu Pallawela. According to World Intellectual property organisation WIPO Pasidu Pallawela and StorTera holds patent rights to this technology. This technology has been presented in several high-profile industrial energy conferences such as All Energy conference and exhibition in the UK. As a business innovation, this technology was nominated for MEL British Chamber of commerce Awards in 2017 as the best business innovation and won the category award. SLIQ also won several Rushlight awards in 2020, winning the overall Rushlight award, energy environmental group category award and the Energy Efficiency group Award.

== Prototypes and industrial applications ==
Sustainable Islands International website reports that a 30kWh/8 kW prototype has been installed in Scotland to support a remote community and has been running successfully since 2013. This product has been recently selected by Canadian and UK governments to install large scale SLIQ battery systems to support the grid and to support storage of renewable generation. According to this news article in a British newspaper this technology and supporting electronics will demonstrate how this energy storage systems can increase uptake of renewables, save money for customers and utilities, and accelerate carbon reductions by boosting the use of electric energy. The University of Strathclyde is leading a research project aimed at reducing the cost and improving the performance of battery technologies, for use in developing countries and emerging economies using this technology. With the development of this technology for developing countries, the faraday institute and University of Strathclyde believe they can help communities with low or no connectivity to have reliable access to energy sources and bringing economic, social and environment benefits to developing countries and emerging economies. In addition, this technology has been used to set up a smart energy network for Perth & Kinross council to decarbonise all their assets and to achieve net-zero status.
