= Philip Dee =

English nuclear physicist (1904–1983)

Philip Ivor Dee CBE FRS FRSE (8 April 1904 in Stroud – 17 April 1983 in Glasgow) was an English nuclear physicist. He was responsible for the development of airborne radar during World War II. The University of Glasgow named the Philip Ivor Dee Memorial Lecture after him.

== Life ==
Dee was born in Stroud in Gloucestershire on 8 April 1904 the second of three sons of Maria Kitchen, daughter of William Tiley, a butcher of Ebley and Albert John Dee, schoolmaster in Cainscross. He was educated at Marling School, Stroud and gained a scholarship to Sidney Sussex College, Cambridge. In 1926 he graduated with an MA having obtained a first class in both parts of the natural sciences tripos. After university he took on research roles, initially as a student of Charles Thomson Rees Wilson, at the Cavendish Laboratory during which time Samuel Curran worked under him.

In 1929 Dee married Phyllis Elsie, daughter of George Williams Tyte.

He was elected a Fellow of the Royal Society in 1941 and won its Hughes Medal in 1952. During World War II, he initially worked in the Ministry of Aircraft Production and in 1940 moved to the Telecommunications Research Establishment. Dee led the team that developed the Village Inn radar system.

After the World War II, in 1945, he became Professor of Natural Philosophy at the University of Glasgow.

He was created a Commander of the Order of the British Empire (CBE) in the 1946 Birthday Honours, having already been appointed an Officer of the Order (OBE) in the 1943 Birthday Honours.

In 1946, he received government funding to build equipment to investigate particle physics. This development placed the University of Glasgow as a world authority in particle physics during the 1950s.

In 1946, Dees was elected a Fellow of the Royal Society of Edinburgh. His proposers were Thomas Alty, John Walton, Edward Provan Cathcart and Robert Muir. He was awarded the Society's Gunning Victoria Jubilee Prize for 1958–1962 in recognition of his work on nuclear physics.

He retired in 1972 and received an honorary doctorate (DSc) from the University of Strathclyde in 1980.

He died in the Western Infirmary, Glasgow on 17 April 1983. His obituary was written by Samuel Curran.

== Artistic recognition ==
His 1973 portrait by Kathryn Kynoch is held by the Hunterian Art Gallery.

== Family ==
In 1929 Dee married Phyllis Elsie, daughter of George Williams Tyte, a clockmaker. They had two daughters.

== Archives ==
The archives of Philip Ivor Dee are maintained by the Archives of the University of Glasgow (GUAS).

== See also ==
- Telecommunications Research Establishment
- RAF Defford
- James Atkinson
