= James Atkinson (physicist) =

British physicist

James Robert Atkinson FInstP FRSE FRMetS
- Born: James Robert Atkinson; 17 February 1916; Wallington, England
- Died: 9 May 2008 (aged 92); Cupar, Fife, Scotland
- Occupation: Experimental physicist

James Robert Atkinson (17 February 1916 – 9 May 2008) was a British physicist.

== Career ==
On graduating from St John's College, Cambridge in 1938 he took a research post at the Air Ministry Research Establishment in Bawdsey Manor where he carried out research into ‘afterglow’ Cathode Ray Tubes, later taking on a special assignment to upgrade the Chain Home radar stations.

In 1940, he joined the Telecommunications Research Establishment (TRE) where he worked on research into 10 cm, 3 cm and 1 cm wave radar later going on to work on research into super-refraction phenomena and infra red detectors for scope guided missile weapons.

After the war, he joined Glasgow University’s Natural Philosophy department under Professor Philip Dee and between 1945 and 1958 he worked on expansion, diffusion and bubble chambers investigating nuclear photodisintegration by gamma rays.

In 1958, he took up a post at UKAEA Dounreay where he took charge of the testing reactor. Moving on in 1966, he became Assistant Director at the British Ship Research Association working on research into ship architecture, vibration and noise.

In 1976, he joined the Institute of Offshore Engineering at Heriot-Watt University, Edinburgh where he pursued research into wave energy before retiring in 1979.

== Bibliography ==
- J R Atkinson et al. 1938 The accuracy of rectifier-photoelectric cells, Proceedings of the. Physics. Society Vol. 50 No.6 p. 934-946
- J R Atkinson & A f Howartson 1951 Nuclear Scattering of Electrons and Positrons in Argon, Philosophical Magazine 42, p. 1136-45 (October 1951)
- J R Atkinson 1955 Condensation Nuclei by U.V. Light, Geofisica pura e applicata 31, p. 54
- J R Atkinson & A J Barnard 1952 The Diffusion Cloud Chamber, Nature 169, p. 170 - 173 (2 February 1952)
- J R Atkinson et al. 1956 The Photodisintegration of Nitrogen, Proceedings of the. Physics. Society Vol.A 69 No.2 p. 77-92
- J R Atkinson 1958 Education in the Atom Age III: Stepping Up the Output of Scientists and Technologists, The Scottish Educational Journal Vol. 41 p. 13-17 (3 January 1958)
- J R Atkinson et al. 1960 Scattering of Electrons and Positrons by Xenon and Mercury, Proceedings of the. Physics. Society Vol.75 No.3 p. 447-449
- J R Atkinson 1972 An Integrated Approach to Design and Production, Philosophical Transactions of the Royal Society of London. Series A, Mathematical and Physical Sciences Vol. 273 p. 99-118
