= Kathryn Kynoch =

Scottish painter (1941–2025)

- Born: 18 August 1941; Edinburgh, Scotland
- Died: 27 February 2025
- Occupation: Painter
- Website: https://www.kathrynkynoch.co.uk/

Kathryn Kynoch (18 August 1941 – 27 February 2025) was a Scottish painter known for her painted portraits of many prominent Scots.

== Biography ==
Kynoch was born in Portobello, Edinburgh in 1941. She attended grammar school in Leicester. From 1959 to 1964, she studied at the Glasgow School of Art, where she studied under David Donaldson and Geoffrey Squire. After finishing her postgraduate diploma, she studied for four months in Madrid at the Museo del Prado.

Kynoch's work has been widely exhibited in Scotland. Among those notable that she painted include Lord Wheatley, Sir Alec Cairncross, Lilian McDonald, and Sir Donald Liddle. In 1994, Kynoch was elected as an artist member of the Royal Glasgow Institute of the Fine Arts and in 2021, she was made an artist member of the Royal Society of Portrait Painters.
