= Samuel Curran =

Scottish physicist (1912–1998)

Sir Samuel Crowe Curran, FRS, FRSE (23 May 1912 – 15 February 1998) was a Scottish physicist and academic who was the first Principal and Vice-Chancellor of the University of Strathclyde – the first of the new technical universities in Britain. He is the inventor of the scintillation counter, the proportional counter, and the proximity fuze.

To date, Curran remains the longest serving principal and vice chancellor of the University of Strathclyde, holding the post for 16 years, not counting his previous five years as principal of the Royal College of Science and Technology.

== Life ==
Samuel Curran was born on 23 May 1912 at Ballymena in Ireland, the son of John Hamilton Curran (from Kinghorn in Fife), and his wife, Sarah Carson Crowe (some sources state Sarah Owen Crowe).

The family moved to Scotland soon after for his father to work as foreman of a steelworks near Wishaw. His brother Robert Curran, later a famous pathologist, was born soon after. He had two other brothers, Hamilton and John.

After schooling at Wishaw High School (where he was dux) he completed his first degree in mathematics earning first class honours, and a PhD in physics at the University of Glasgow, before taking a second PhD at the Cavendish Laboratory as a member of St John's College, Cambridge.

At the start of the Second World War Curran and Joan Strothers, who he subsequently married, went to work at the Telecommunications Research Establishment at Worth Matravers on the development of radar. In 1944, he moved to the University of California, Berkeley to participate in the Manhattan Project, developing the atomic bomb. There he invented the scintillation counter by adding a photomultiplier tube to an existing scintillation crystal which had previously been viewed by the human eye to obtain a radiation count. This device is widely used to this day to measure ionizing radiation.

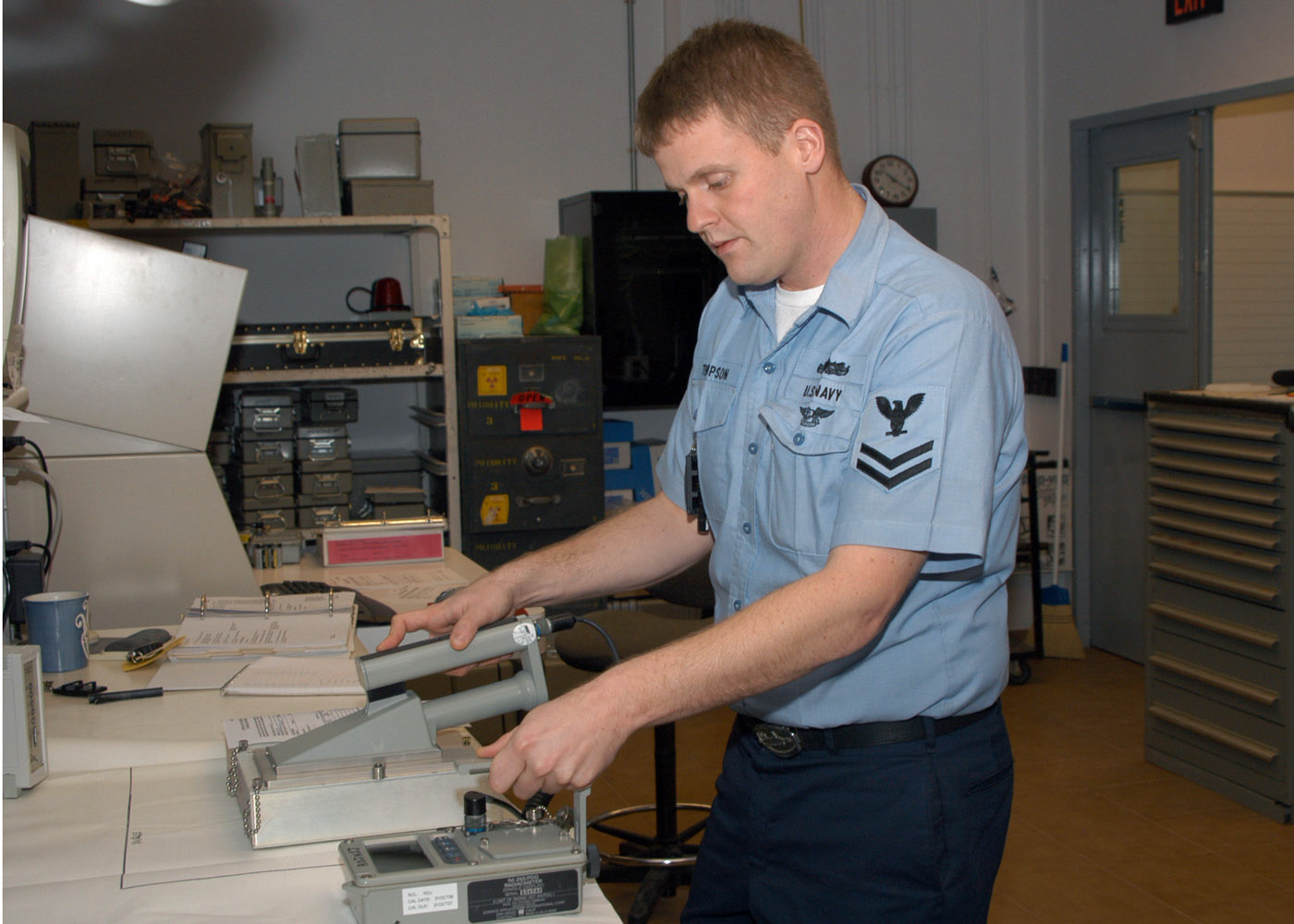
Alpha scintillation probe based on Curran's principle under calibration.

After the war Curran worked at the University of Glasgow and at the Atomic Weapons Research Establishment at Aldermaston and invented the proportional counter in 1948.

In 1947 he was elected a Fellow of the Royal Society of Edinburgh. His proposers were Thomas Alty, Philip Dee, Robert A Houston and James W Cook. In 1953 he became a Fellow of the Royal Society.

In 1959, he took up the position of principal of the Royal College of Science and Technology in Glasgow which he led to full university status in 1964 as the University of Strathclyde, being appointed its first principal and vice-chancellor. In doing so, he helped create the first new university in Scotland for 381 years and the first technological university in Britain, thus initiating the trend of formation of modern technical universities in Britain. Curran was knighted in 1970. He remained at the university until his retirement in 1980, when he was succeeded in the role by Graham Hills. In his honour, the new building for the Andersonian Library was named after him the following year.

He was the recipient of at least five honorary doctorates including an LLD from both Glasgow University and Aberdeen University. Curran was the recipient of the 1976 St Mungo Prize, awarded to the individual who has done most in the previous three years to improve and promote the city of Glasgow.

Following the birth of a handicapped daughter, the Currans set up the Scottish Society for the Parents of Mentally Handicapped Children, now known as Enable Scotland, with Samuel Curran serving as its president from 1964 to 1991.

Samuel Curran died on 15 February 1998 in hospital in Glasgow, aged 85.

== Family ==
He was married to Joan Strothers, a scientist involved with the invention of anti-radar tactics such as Operation Window at the Royal Aircraft Establishment at Farnborough. They married soon after his posting to Farnborough in 1940, having known her earlier during his Cambridge days.

== Major publications ==
- Counting Tubes (1949), S.C. Curran, Academic Press (New York), (with J. D. Craggs)
- Luminescence and the Scintillation Counter (1953)
- Alpha, Beta and Gamma Ray Spectroscopy (1964)
- Energy Resources and the Environment (1976)
- Energy and Human Needs (1979) (with J. S. Curran)
- Issues in Science and Education (1988)

Various papers on nuclear researches and education in Procedures of the Royal Society

== Sources ==
- Latham, Colin & Stobbs, Anne: Pioneers of Radar (1999, Sutton, England) ISBN 0-7509-2120-X (Contribution from Sir Samuel & Lady Curran, pp 194–196)
