= Enable Scotland =

Scottish charity for people with learning disabilities

Enable Scotland (stylised as ENABLE Scotland; formerly the Scottish Society for the Parents of Mentally Handicapped Children and Scottish Society for the Mentally Handicapped) is a member-led charity based in Scotland that supports people who have learning disabilities and their families. Founded in 1954 they campaign for equal rights for people who have learning disabilities and also provide personalised services to assist them with various problems in their lives. Typical difficulties addressed include access to employment, transportation, support for families, and help with finances. Enable Scotland also run the Scotland Employers Award. Theresa Shearer FRSE is the charity's current Chief Executive.

== History ==
The idea for a support organisation for children who have learning disabilities dates back to February 28, 1944, when a group of five parents met together in a Scottish living room. They planned to create an organisation to campaign for services in Scotland that would benefit children who have learning disabilities and their parents. Their first meeting was held in the education offices in Glasgow, and was an unexpected success; over 350 people attended from across Scotland. The founding members included Catherine Shapter, and the physicists Joan Curran and Samuel Curran.

== Campaigns ==
They received media attention in 2007 from an advertising campaign that compared people with learning disabilities to pets. They were also featured on STV News for a campaign that highlighted the difficulties of elderly carers of disabled children.

== Controversies ==
The charity received criticism over their personal data handling after the personal data of 101 people was lost in November 2011. They have since committed to improving their practices in this area.
