= University of Strathclyde Faculty of Engineering =

The University of Strathclyde Faculty of Engineering is the engineering school at the University of Strathclyde in Glasgow, Scotland. The faculty offers over 40 undergraduate and postgraduate courses which are taught in one of the eight departments. These range from BEng, MEng and MSc courses to doctorates throughout the faculty.

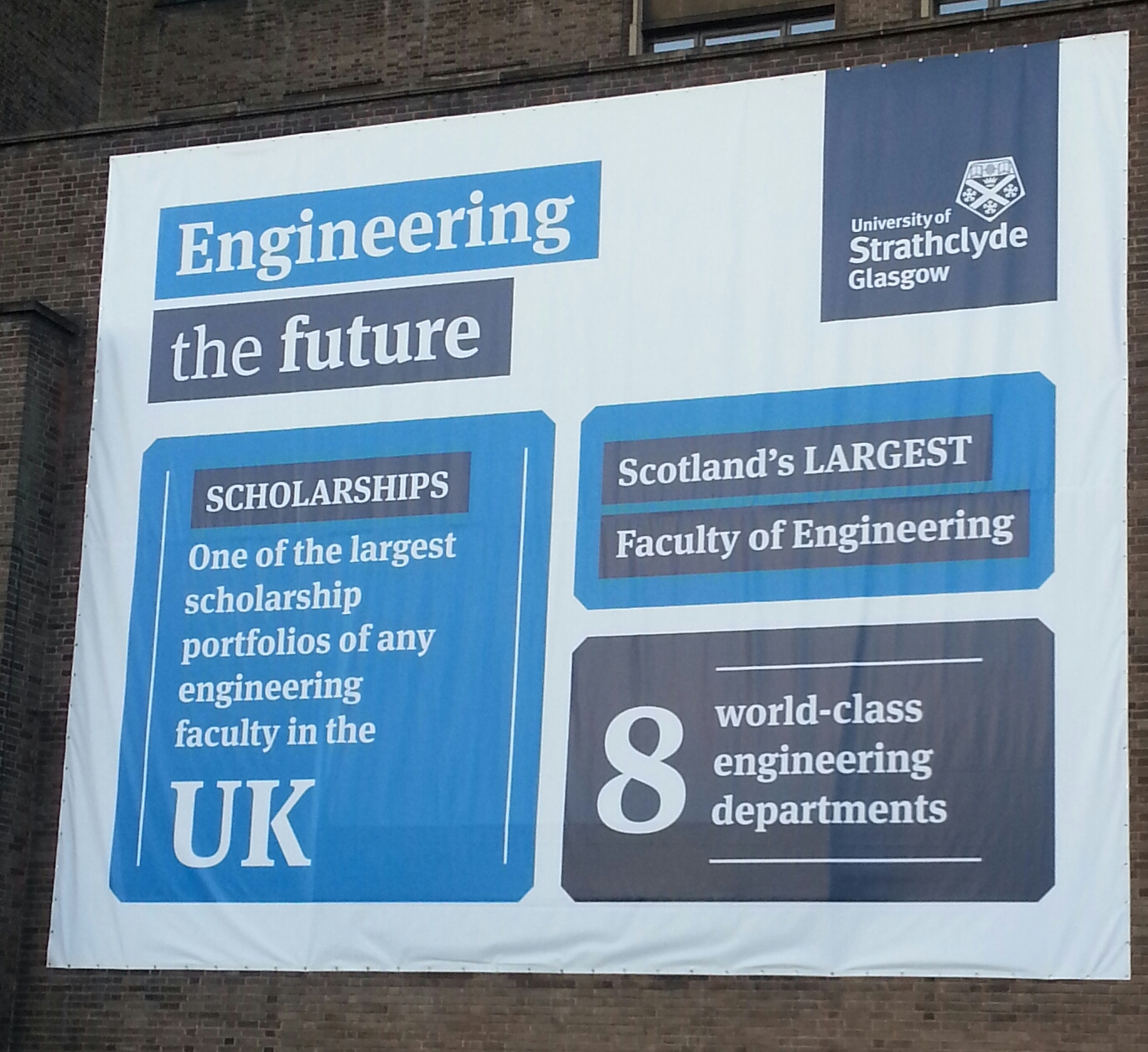
Poster outside of the James-Weir Building.

It teaches over 4,000 students, who come from many different countries. 3,000 of these are undergraduates, 650 are postgraduates, and 500 are at the university for research.

== Departments ==
The faculty has eight departments. These are:

- Architecture
- Biomedical engineering
- Chemical and Process Engineering
- Civil and Environmental Engineering
- Design, Manufacture and Engineering Management
- Electronic and Electrical Engineering
- Mechanical and Aerospace engineering
- Naval Architecture and Marine Engineering

=== Architecture ===
The department moved to the James Weir Building in August 2013. Part of the department contains The Centre for Research in Sustainability and Design (CRiDAS). This is a centre that works on the implementation and improvement of technology to help reduce environmental and social impacts of buildings.

Strathclyde was ranked the 11th best university for architecture in 2013 by The Complete University Guide.

=== Biomedical Engineering ===
The Department of Biomedical Engineering is located at the Wolfson Centre, which was built in 1972 specifically for the Bioengineering Unit as it was then called. The department incorporates the National Centre for Prosthetics and Orthotics which is one of only two institutions in the UK offering undergraduate and postgraduate education in Prosthetics and Orthotics. The Centre's interests in training, education and research span the fields of prosthetics, orthotics and related aspects of the provision of aid for the disabled. The Centre was originally located in the Curran Building but was displaced to the Wolfson Centre due to the need to expand the Andersonian Library.

=== Chemical and Process Engineering ===
The Department of Chemical and Process Engineering is located at the James Weir Building. Chemical Engineering at Strathclyde was rated the best in Scotland in the last Scottish Higher Education Funding Council Teaching Quality Assessment. All of the BEng, MEng and MSc courses are fully accredited by the Institution of Chemical Engineers.

The department also specializes in advanced computational modelling; looking at materials and processes on all scales from the atomic to the macroscopic. Strathclyde University Chemical and Process Engineering has been ranked 16th by Complete University Guide and rated 13th by The Guardian in 2013.

=== Design, Manufacture and Engineering Management (dmem) ===
The department is located on Level 7 of the James Weir Building. DMEM was founded in 1989 through a merger between the former Department of Production Management and Manufacturing Technology, the Design Division (formerly part of the Department of Mechanical Engineering) and the CAD Centre research group. One of its most notable academics was Stuart Pugh, creator of the "Total Design" methodology which became an industry standard. Pugh served as Professor and head of the department from 1989 until his death in 1993.

=== Electronic and Electrical Engineering ===
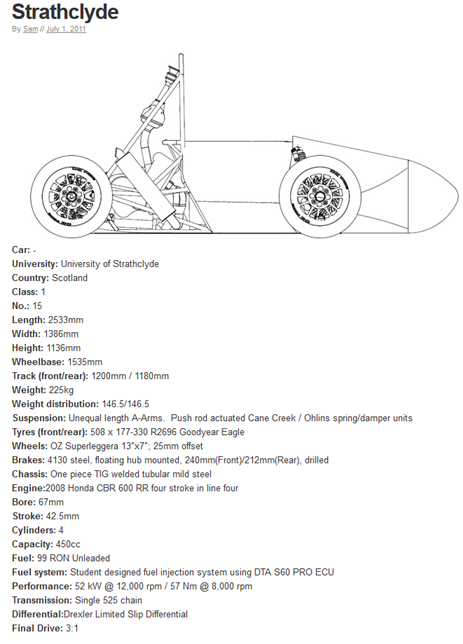
The car that Students of Electronic and Electrical Engineering created.

The department is located within the Royal College of Science and Technology Building.

=== Department of Mechanical and Aerospace Engineering ===
The department of Mechanical and Aerospace Engineering is located in the University of Strathclyde's James Weir building.

Primary research is carried out via its research centres and laboratories in Fluids, Energy, Aerospace engineering and Materials science: Aerospace Centre of Excellence (including Advanced Space Concepts Laboratory, Future Air-Space Transportation Technology, and Intelligent Computational Engineering Laboratory), Energy Systems Research Unit, James Weir Fluids Laboratory, Mechanics & Materials Research Centre.

=== Naval Architecture and Marine Engineering ===
The Department of Naval Architecture and Marine Engineering is located at the Henry Dyer Building. The BEng and MEng courses are accredited by the Royal Institution of Naval Architects (RINA) and the Institute of Marine Engineering, Science and Technology (IMarEST) on behalf of the Engineering Council.

== Staff ==
As of July 2017 there were 23 key members of staff in the Faculty of Engineering (not including the staff of each department).

As of 2023, the Executive Dean and Associate Principal of the Faculty of Engineering was Professor Stephen McArthur.

== Research ==
Researchers at the Aerospace Centre of Excellence have led the €4 million, Europe-wide Stardust project, a research-based training network investigating the removal of space debris and the deflection of asteroids and the first programme of its kind in the world.

== Competitions ==
A team of three students by the name of Team Hydra, composed of Eric Brown, Hugh McQueen and Theo Scott, developed and entered a solution to reduce the cost of passenger kilometers in Germany. The competition they entered the solution into was called the BP Ultimate Field Trip, they won the first prize. The runners up of this competition were a combined team of students from Strathclyde and Glasgow.
