= Royal College of Science and Technology =

- "The Tech"
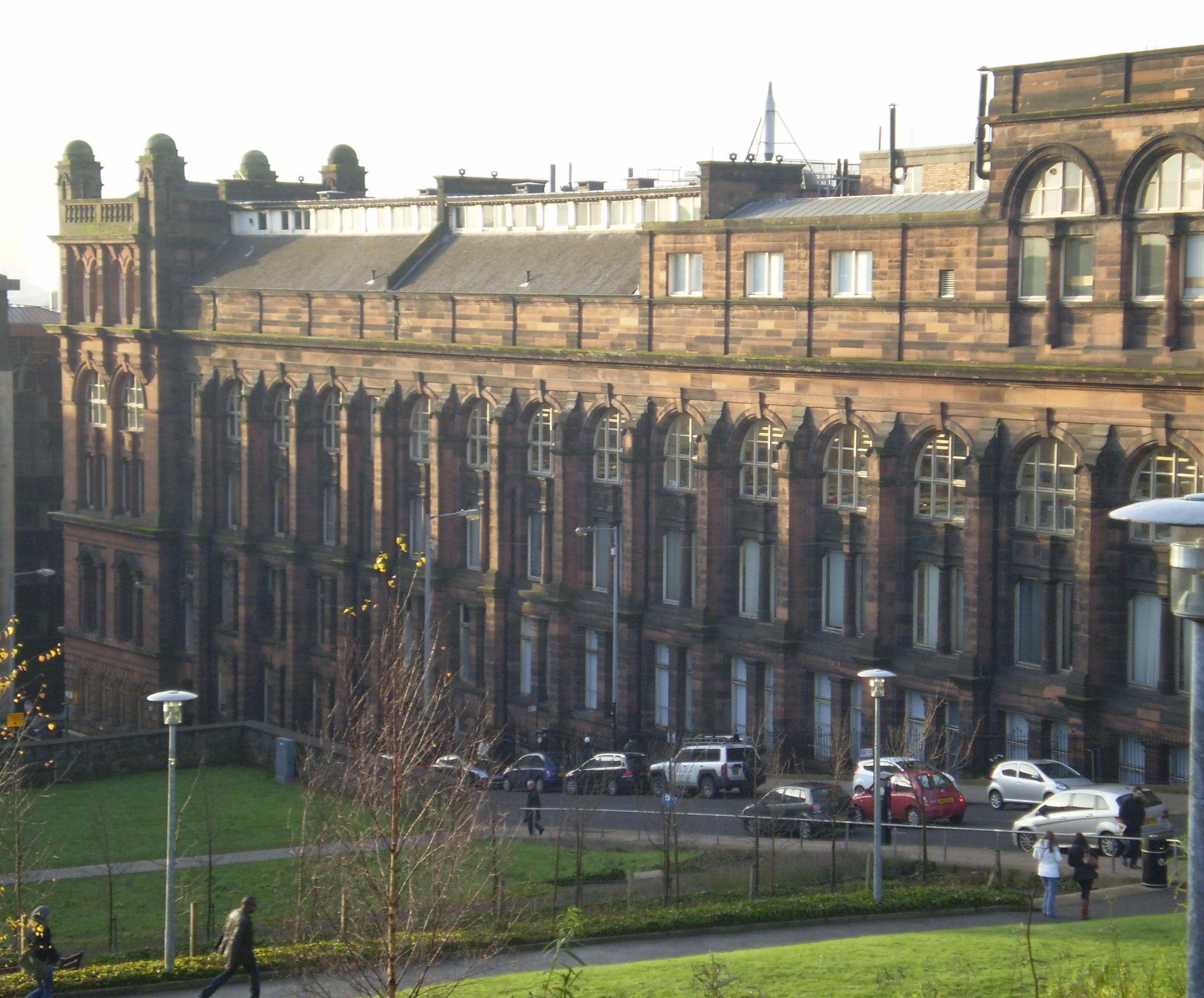
- The eastern side of the 1912 Royal College building on Montrose Street.
- Former names: Glasgow and West of Scotland Technical College
- Active: 1887–1964 – Merged with Scottish College of Commerce to form the University of Strathclyde
- Location: Glasgow, Scotland

The Royal College of Science and Technology was a higher education college that existed in Glasgow, Scotland between 1887 and 1964. Tracing its history back to the Andersonian Institute (founded in 1796), it is the direct predecessor institution of the University of Strathclyde (along with the Scottish College of Commerce). Its main building on George Street now serves as one of the major academic and administration buildings of the University of Strathclyde.

== History ==
Originally the "Glasgow and West of Scotland Technical College", The Royal College of Science and Technology was formed in 1887. Glasgow and West of Scotland Technical College'was formed through the amalgamation of Anderson's Institute, the College of Science and Arts, Allan Glen's Institution, the Young Chair of Technical Chemistry and Atkinson's Institution. In the case of Anderson's Institute, the history of the college could be traced back to 1796. Because of the ever-increasing number of students attending the college, larger premises became necessary. Work to expand the Glasgow and West of Scotland Technical College building began in 1903, taking nine years to complete. At that time, it was the largest single educational complex in Europe.

After seeking permission from King George V in 1912 the College changed its name to the Royal Technical College. In 1956 there was another change of name for the College and it became the Royal College of Science and Technology.

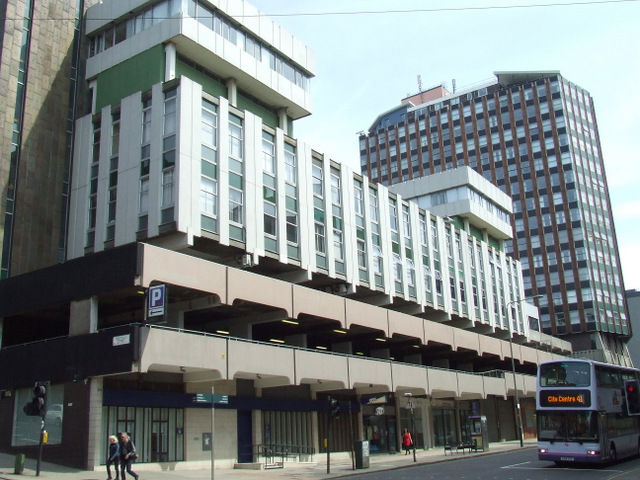
The McCance Building and Livingstone Tower were completed in 1964, just as the College obtained its Royal Charter to become the University of Strathclyde

After plans had been stalled by World War 2, by the 1950s work had resumed on the Royal College's campus to the north of the 1903 building. An extension was added onto the John Street side of the building in 1949 which housed a new swimming pool. St Paul's Church was purchased by the College in 1953 to act as its Chaplaincy, while in 1956 construction began on the new Engineering Block on Montrose Street (subsequently named as the James Weir Building). A new Student's Union was built in 1959 on John Street. The Engineering Block was extended in 1962 along with a new Chemistry Block (later named for the College's famous alumnus Thomas Graham) built on the former site of John Street Ironworks. All four buildings form what is now known as the "Island Site", and have undergone major renovations in recent years. In 1961 the Royal College entered into an agreement with Glasgow Corporation to jointly redevelop the adjacent Richmond Street site which had recently been cleared of its housing and a former church. The development would give the College a new and expanded home for the Andersonian Library as well as new accommodation for its new social sciences departments – this opening as the McCance Building in 1964, while the merged University of Strathclyde would take possession of the entire complex which included the 13-storey Alec House in 1965 which it subsequently renamed the Livingstone Tower.

In 1959, renowned physicist Sir Samuel Curran took up the position of principal of the Royal College of Science and Technology, and following extensive discussions with Sir Keith Murray (chairman of the University Grants Committee), the College was granted full university status in 1964 as the University of Strathclyde. Curran was appointed its first Principal and Vice-Chancellor. This was the first new university in Scotland for 381 years and the first technological university in Britain, thus initiating the trend of formation of modern technical universities in Britain as part of the wider Robbins Report.

Sir Samuel remained at the university until retirement in 1980 – the replacement building for the Andersonian Library opened that year was named in his honour.

Following the recommendation of the Robbins Committee, the Scottish College of Commerce amalgamated with the College to form the University of Strathclyde in 1964. Since then, the Royal College Building has served as the centrepiece building of the University of Strathclyde.

Local nicknames for the Royal College, and its antecedents, – The Tech – and – The Poly (from Polytechnic) – are now rarely used as younger generations of students have only ever known it as the University of Strathclyde. Despite this, the names Tech and Techies are still used by some students of the rival University of Glasgow in a jocular/derogatory context to describe the University of Strathclyde and its students/alumni. The nickname The Tech among locals did transfer to some extent to the Glasgow College of Technology (founded in 1971), but it too would go on to achieve university status in 1993 when it became Glasgow Caledonian University.

== Departments ==
The Royal College Building on George Street is currently occupied by Strathclyde University and houses the following academic departments:

- Department of Bioscience, Faculty of Science
- Department of Chemistry, Pure and Applied, Faculty of Science
- Department of Electronic and Electrical Engineering, Faculty of Engineering
- Technology and Business Studies, Strathclyde Business School

=== Department of Bioscience, Faculty of Science ===
The Department of Bioscience in the Faculty of Science was originally in the royal college building but with the completion of the new John Arbuthnot (SIPBS) building the department has moved. The courses available are still the same with undergraduate and postgraduate degrees available. The undergraduate degrees available are split into two subjects: Biological and Biomedical Science; and Pharmacy. Some of the degrees available in Biological and Biomedical Science are BSc Biological Sciences, BSc Biomedical Sciences, Forensic Biology. The full list can be found at the courses homepage. There are five postgraduate degrees; MSc/PgDip in Clinical Pharmacy, MSc/PgDip in Food Biotechnology, MSc/PgDip in Food Science and Microbiology, MSc/PgDip in Pharmaceutical Analysis and MSc/PgDip in Pharmaceutical Quality and Good Manufacturing Practice. The postgraduate degree is a follow-on from the undergraduate degree.

=== Department of Chemistry, Pure and Applied, Faculty of Science ===
Part of the Department of Pure and Applied Chemistry is located in the Royal College Building on Level 6 - most of the department is located in the Thomas Graham Building which was built in 1963. The department of Chemistry was not always in the royal college building because it was established before the University of Strathclyde. This department was established in the 19th Century and over the last 200 years it has become an accredited department with a very highly rated reputation. The department of Pure and Applied Chemistry offers three types of degrees; Undergraduate, Postgraduate taught and Postgraduate research. The undergraduate degree lasts for four years and students have the choice of 10 areas to study in. some of these areas are a Masters Chemistry degree, a Masters Forensic and Analytical Chemistry degree, Chemistry and teaching, BSc Chemistry degree and BSc Chemistry with Drug Discovery are just a few to name all the available degrees can be found at the courses homepage . To get into the undergraduate degrees you need to have the 48 credits for the BSc degree and 60 credits for the master's degree. The credit conversion table can be found at this page UCAS credit table. To apply to one of the undergraduate courses you have to do this through UCAS which is an online application form. They are two postgraduate taught degrees available and these are MSc/PgDip in Forensic Science and MSc/PgDip in Forensic Informatics. Both of these degrees last one year and it is a progression from the undergraduate degree. They are few people who take the Postgraduate teaching degree after doing an undergraduate degree because they have graduated and found a job.

=== Electrical and Electronic Engineering ===
The Department of Electrical and Electronic Engineering (EEE) is housed inside the Royal College of science and technology. The department boasts over 200 academic, research, technical and support staff, 250 PhD, MPhil and MSc students and over 600 undergraduates. The highest ratings for both teaching provision and research as determined by the UK national assessment bodies are also seen within this department. It offers a diverse range of undergraduate and postgraduate degree programmes. The department has always maintained a top research rating. In 2008, Research Assessment Exercise (RAE) results confirmed EEE at Strathclyde as the top EEE research Department in Scotland, and positioned it third in the UK (out of 33).

The current undergraduate courses offered by this department include:

- BEng/MEng Computer and Electronic Systems
- BEng/MEng Digital Communications and Multimedia Systems
- BEng/MEng Electrical Energy Systems
- BEng/MEng Electrical and Mechanical Engineering
- BEng/MEng Electronic and Digital Systems
- BEng/MEng Electronic and Electrical Engineering
- MEng Electronic and Electrical Engineering with Business Studies
- MEng Electronic and Electrical Engineering with European Studies

Technology and Business Studies

Technology and Business Studies is a course taught by the Strathclyde University Business School in the Royal College of Science and Technology. The course offers to help students understand the language of technology and of business and the communication skills used by managers on a daily basis. The uniqueness of this course allows undergraduates to understand interrelationships between technology and business. Because of the wide variety of options available in the TBS course, students can tailor their course to suit their own career targets.

There are three technology subjects offered to students at Strathclyde University and they all last for 4 or 5 years depending on what level you are doing. The three subjects available are:

- Environmental Technology
- Manufacturing Engineering
- Computer Science

The Business subjects offered to students at Strathclyde University all last for 4 or 5 years depending on what level you are doing. The three subjects available are:

- Accounting
- Economics
- Finance
- Management Science
- Marketing
