= Unmanned Aerial Vehicle Systems Association =

Trade association

The Unmanned Aerial Vehicle Systems Association (UAVS) was created in 1998 when key individuals from Matra-BAe Dynamics-Alenia (MBDA), British Aerospace (BAe) and Remote Services recognised that the United Kingdom UAV industry did not have a collective voice or representative in the industry's interface with government and the regulators.

Its initial mission statement was to promote the safe, integrated and effective use of UAVs in both military and civilian airspace environments. This mission statement still holds true.

UAVS is a traditional trade association. Its role is to interface with government and the regulators ensuring that industry's perspectives, objectives and views are put forward in a constructive manner at the highest possible decision making point. It also promotes the industry and its members and addresses the issues facing the industry on a collective basis.

== Core Themes ==
UAVS pursues four core themes that are critical to the future success of this industry:

- Regulation
- Certification
- Training
- Operations

UAVs will in future have to be equivalent to and as transparent as manned aircraft if they are to be allowed to fly in controlled airspace. The UK Civil Aviation Authority (CAA) has published its policy regarding the Operation of UAVs in Controlled Airspace, CAP722. This policy is being adopted around the world by other Aviation Authorities such as the Federal Aviation Authority (FAA), the Joint Aviation Authority (JAA) and the European Aviation Safety Agency (EASA). Although this is still just policy, UAV airframe constructors and flight control system suppliers face major challenges in meeting the existing regulatory standards in terms of the systems carried on-board but there will be new requirements specific to UAVs, such as Sense & Avoid, which will add to the certification burden.

Certification goes hand in with regulation. UAVs need to be proven and reliable systems and meet the same certification criteria as manned aircraft. Many of those currently building UAVs have never had to go through the certification route. In the past, certification for military operations has been performed by the military themselves absolving the manufacturers of this requirement but in the future, the CAA will look to the manufacturer for that certification assurance.

Whether an UAV is going through experimental flying or proving trials or is carrying out the CAA's definition of 'aerial work', i.e. paid flying activity, the UAV pilot and commander have to be suitably qualified. Argument abounds as to whether the best UAV pilot is a qualified and experienced manned aircraft pilot or a video game expert. UAVs operate out of line of sight with the UAV pilot dependent on the telemetry and other data returned by the UAV to understand exactly what is happening to the UAV and what it is doing.

UAV operators, like civil airline operators, will not be the UAV constructors. UAV operators, like civil airline operators, will be the interface with local, regional, national and international air traffic managers. The operation and interface of UAVs in controlled airspace will have to be seamless to the air traffic managers and to other manned aircraft airspace users. Training of the UAV pilot to the required standard will be essential.
