= Harry Cranbrook Allen =

British historian

- Born: 23 March 1917
- Died: 21 June 1998 (aged 81); Philadelphia, Pennsylvania, U.S.
- Education: Bedford School, Pembroke College, Oxford
- Scientific career
- Fields: Historian
- Workplaces: University of Oxford, University College London, University of East Anglia

Harry Cranbrook Allen MC FRHS (23 March 1917 – 21 June 1998) was a British historian of the United States.

== Biography ==
Born on 23 March 1917, Harry Cranbrook Allen was educated at Bedford School and at Pembroke College, Oxford, where he was a Scholar and gained a first class degree in Modern History. He was elected as a Fellow by the Commonwealth Fund of New York in 1939 (he took up the Fellowship at Harvard University after the Second World War). He served during the Second World War with the Hertfordshire Regiment and the Dorset Regiment in France and Germany, was promoted to the rank of Major, awarded the Military Cross, and appointed as Commandant of the 43rd Division Educational College, between June and November 1945.

He was Fellow and Tutor in Modern History at Lincoln College, Oxford, between 1946 and 1955, Commonwealth Fund Professor of American History at University College London, between 1955 and 1971, and Director of the Institute of United States Studies at the University of London, between 1966 and 1971. He was Professor of American Studies at the University of East Anglia, between 1971 and 1980, Dean of the School of English and American Studies at the University of East Anglia, between 1974 and 1976, and Emeritus Professor of American Studies at the University of East Anglia, between 1980 and 1998.

He was Senior Research Fellow at the Australian National University, Canberra, and Visiting Scholar at the University of California, Berkeley, between 1953 and 1954, Schouler Lecturer at Johns Hopkins University, in 1956, American Studies Fellow at the Commonwealth Fund of New York, in 1957, Visiting Member of the Institute for Advanced Study, Princeton, New Jersey, in 1959, Visiting Professor at the University of Rochester, in 1963, and Visiting Professor at the University of Michigan, in 1966.

Allen was made a Fellow of the Royal Historical Society in 1955, Chairman of the British Association for American Studies, between 1974 and 1977, and President of the European Association for American Studies, between 1976 and 1980. He died in Philadelphia on 21 June 1998, aged 81.

== Publications ==
- Great Britain and the United States: a history of Anglo-American relations, 1783-1952. London: Oldhams Press, 1954.
- British Essays in American History. London: Arnold, 1957 (edited, with Charles Peter Hill).
- Bush and Backwoods: a comparison of the frontier in Australia and the United States. Sydney: Angus & Robertson, 1959.
- The Anglo-American Relationship Since 1783. London: A. & C. Black, 1959.
- The Anglo-American Predicament: the British Commonwealth, the United States and European unity. London: Macmillan, 1960.
- The United States of America. London: Benn, 1964 (2nd edition entitled A Concise History of the U.S.A.. London: Benn, 1970).
- Contrast and Connection: bicentennial essays in Anglo-American history. London: Bell, 1976 (edited, with Roger Thompson).
