= Disappearance of Donna Keogh =

1998 missing person case in Middlesbrough, England

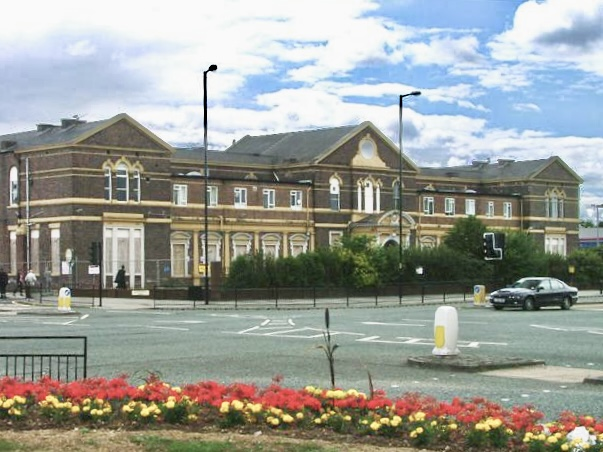
- Bolchow's Hospital, Hartington Road in 2005 (since been demolished)
- Born: England
- Disappeared: 28 April 1998; Middlesbrough, England
- Status: Missing for 28 years, 4 months and 22 days
- Website: www.finddonna.co.uk

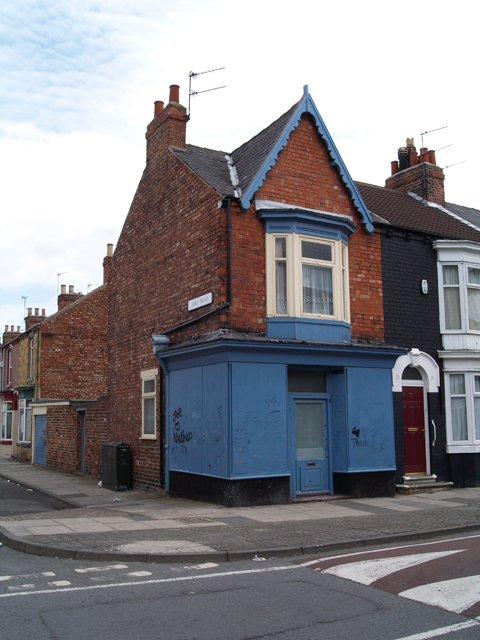
Aske Road, Gresham, Middlesbrough

Locations 1998
1 King House, Middlesbrough where Donna Keogh was living.
2 Bow Street, Gresham, Middlesbrough where Donna Keogh was last sighted.

Donna Keogh is a British teenage girl who disappeared in Middlesbrough, England on 28 April 1998. For 27 years the case has gone unsolved.

== Background ==
Donna Keogh was born into a military family and was raised in Middlesbrough where she attended Newlands and Sacred Heart Schools. Her parents were Brian and Shirley Keogh. Donna Keogh was described as a bubbly and ambitious girl. Keogh worked at Ormesby Care Home and hoped to eventually join the Royal Navy. At the time of her disappearance, she was living with her cousins at King House, Middlesbrough. Her parents became aware their daughter had become involved with drugs just before her disappearance. She had also reportedly been involved in prostitution. Keogh was known to have travelled to Leeds in 1998. She was reportedly sighted visiting the Chapeltown area of the city.

== Disappearance ==
Donna Keogh was last seen in Middlesbrough town centre on 28 April 1998. At the time of her disappearance, she had reportedly visited a house with a friend and did not return. She was last reported seen at a house on Bow Street in the Gresham area of Middlesbrough. No further sightings were confirmed. A police review of evidence established that on the day she disappeared she was reported seen in the Hartington Road, Aske Road and Bow Street areas of Middlesbrough. One sighting reported she entered a red hatchback vehicle on Hartington Road. There were unconfirmed sightings, now thought to be false, of her in the Zetland Road area in May 1998.

There were a number of different accounts about where she had been spotted. Her father believed that something sinister had happened. Investigators did not believe she had runaway.

== Investigation ==
In March 1999, two individuals were detained on suspicion of murder but were released without charge. The case received considerable media attention. The case soon went cold and police suspected she had been murdered. The parents of Donna Keogh were involved in publicising the case over the years. They appeared in press conferences alongside police.

== Developments ==
The disappearance of Donna Keogh was re-examined by police in 2000 when 21-year-old prostitute Vicky Glass went missing. In 2002, the case was reviewed again following the murder of Rachel Wilson. She was a prostitute who was last seen in the same area. In 2007, Cleveland Police made a renewed appeal. Another appeal was made in 2010. In 2013, a new public appeal was made for the 15th anniversary of the disappearance. In 2015, Cleveland Police apologised to the family as it launched a review of the case. This was after they publicly stated their disappointment with the investigation. Her parents said they felt "let down" by the police.

In 2016, following an independent review of the original police investigation, Cleveland Police launched Operation Resolute, a newly formed inquiry into the case. In 2018, the disappearance of Donna Keogh, along with the unsolved cases of Rachel Wilson and Vicky Glass, were re-investigated by the force after it was awarded £3.77m by the Home Office. Vicki Glass disappeared in September 2000 and her body was found two months later and Rachel Wilson disappeared in May 2002; her body was found 10 years later. A new website was launched by police with vital information about the case.

In June 2018, police began the excavation of a site in Middlesbrough. Cleveland Police announced a specialist search team had begun work on a site in the Saltersgill area. The site is a former allotment located near Troon Close. The site had been long been derelict and is located in a residential area. The search lasted three weeks. The excavation however only uncovered medieval remains.

In June 2025, the parents of Donna Keogh were informed that a man had been detained in Thailand and would be extradited back to the United Kingdom. Her father died on 26 July 2025. A £20,000 reward from Crimestoppers UK was offered for information. On 31 March 2026, the police confirmed that a man had been arrested. The suspect was arrested by West Yorkshire Police. In April 2026, police made a fresh appeal for information. An arrest was made in July 2026 of a Manchester man.

== See also ==
- List of unsolved murders in the United Kingdom (1990s)
