= Ronan McKenzie =

21st-century English racing driver

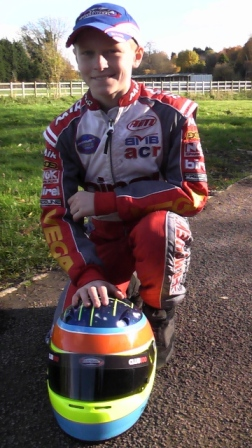
- (2010) Ronan McKenzie karting champion
- Nationality: British
- Born: 1998 (age 27–28) Northampton, England

Stars at Whilton Mill Junior Rotax 125cc Championship career
- Best finish: Champion – Junior Rotax 2014 #5 Junior Rotax Championship 2013 #13 S1 KF3 British Champs 2012; Champion – UK Junior E Plate 2012 #3 UK Junior Championship 2011; Champion – UK Cadet 2010; Champion – UK Cadet E Plate 2010 #3 UK Cadet Championship in 2009

Previous series
- 2014 2013 2012 2012 2011 2011 2011 2009–2010 2009–2010 2009–2010 2006–2010: Stars at Whilton Mill Jnr Rotax; Stars at Whilton Mill Jnr Rotax; KF3 Super1 British Champs; Junior UK Open Championship; Junior UK Championship; Junior European Championship; Junior World Championship; Cadet UK Championship; Cadet European Championship; Cadet World Championship; Comer Cadet Club Championships

Ronan McKenzie before his debut race at Ellough Park (March 2011)

Ronan McKenzie (born 1998) is an English kart racing driver.

McKenzie was signed under an option contract with the Motorsport division of kart manufacturer Birel on their Easykart Driver Program in December 2009.

McKenzie was born in Northampton. Awarded Daventry District Sports Awards Junior Sportsman of the Year for two consecutive years in 2010 and 2011 in recognition of his achievements in motorsport, McKenzie has raced in UK, European and World Championships since 2009 in the MSA approved Easykart Formula, and won the Easykart UK Cadet 60cc Championship in 2010 before graduating to the Easykart Junior 100cc class in 2011.

In McKenzie's debut race in the first round of the Easykart Junior 100cc UK Championship in March 2011, he was named as Driver of the Day by Karting Magazine after he qualified in pole position, and went on to win the heat, pre-final and the final to give him the championship lead, eventually finishing third in his debut season.

McKenzie was also invited to become an Associate Driver of Cranfied University's prestigious Motorsport Programme in 2011, attending university events, taking part in simulator tests and having students attend McKenzie's races and help with the mechanics. McKenzie remained on the driver programme until its end in 2013.

After spending two years on Birel's Driver Program where his progress in the UK and international events were monitored, McKenzie, then 13 years old, was selected to take part in a KF3 125cc test day at the 7 Laghi International Circuit in Castelletto Di Branduzzo, Italy, in October 2011 with three other more experienced and older UK drivers. Although it was the first time McKenzie had driven that class of kart, he achieved the best lap times of the four drivers and was subsequently offered a part-sponsored works drive in Europe for 2012 in the ultra-competitive KF3 class for 13- to 17-year-olds, but was unable to take up the offer due to lack of budget.

McKenzie went on to totally dominate the Junior "E" Plate Open Championship in February 2012, winning all races unchallenged from pole, becoming the first driver to win the title in two different classes at the age of just 13.

McKenzie then joined the 2012 MSA British Super One Championship at the second round in April 2012, after he was approached by a UK race team and offered a KF3 drive, finishing 13th out of 26 in his rookie year. The team ceased operations at the end of the 2012 season, leaving McKenzie without a drive in the KF3 class for 2013.

In 2013, McKenzie switched to competing in the Stars at Whilton Mill Championship in the Junior Rotax 125cc class and came 5th in his debut season.

In November 2014 at the age of 16, McKenzie won the Junior Rotax Stars at Whilton Mill championship – his most notable result claiming victory in round two from 12th on the grid, on the last corner.

McKenzie now competes in endurance karting and is pursuing a career in mechanics.
