= Donald Liddle =

Scottish ceremonial officer

- Born: 11 October 1906; Edinburgh, Scotland
- Died: 12 November 1989 (aged 83)
- Occupation: Businessman
- Spouse: May Liddle
- Children: 3
- Father: Thomas Liddle

Sir Donald Ross Liddle LLD (11 October 1906 – 12 November 1989) was a Scottish corporate director who served as Lord Provost of Glasgow from 1969 to 1972. He was the last Progressive Lord Provost of Glasgow in the 20th century.

== Life ==
He was born in Edinburgh the son of Thomas Liddle, a solicitor of the Supreme Court operating from 57 Queen Street and living at 2 Belford Place near the Water of Leith.

The family moved to Glasgow some time before the First World War to set up a textile business. Donald attended Provanside High School. He was then apprenticed to S H MacKinnon & Co, drapers (and later knitwear manufacturers) at 137 London Road in Glasgow. Attending night school he became first sales manager then factory manager.

In the Second World War he initially did civil defence then joined the Royal Scots in 1941, before transferring to the Royal Army Ordnance Corps in 1942. He served in Burma and rose to the rank of Major in General Auchinleck's headquarters in Delhi in India as deputy assistant director of ordnance.

On demobilisation he returned to Glasgow and strove to set up his own knitwear company, which in 1952 he achieved, employing 30 persons in a premises on King Street. He joined the town council in 1956 as ward councillor to Dennistoun representing the Progressive Party. He rose to be Lord Provost in 1969.

During his period as Lord Provost, he oversaw the investigations into the 1971 Ibrox disaster. In his role as a Director of Rangers Football Club, he was also physically present at the time of the disaster and witnessed much of the tragedy first-hand. Shortly after this, Strathclyde University awarded him an honorary doctorate (LLD). On 1 September 1971, he also had the sad honour of lighting the final operational gas lamp on North Portland Street before they were ripped out and replaced by electric lamps.

From 1972 to 1978 he was Chairman of the Cumbernauld Development Corporation, establishing one of Scotland's major "new towns".

He was knighted by Queen Elizabeth II in June 1974.

In a roller-coaster life, his knitwear business collapsed in 1979 and (without any then corporate position) he found himself unemployed. He then spent some years as a public safety campaigner.

== Personal life and death ==
Liddle was married to May Christie, and together they had a son and two daughters. He died on 12 November 1989, at the age of 83.
