= Thomas Alty =

Scottish physicist (1899–1982)

Thomas Alty FRSE FIP FRSC LLD (10 September 1899 – 2 May 1982) was a Scottish physicist and university administrator who became Chancellor of Rhodes University in South Africa.

== Life ==
He was born in Liverpool on 10 September 1899.

He studied Science at Liverpool University then did postgraduate studies at Cambridge University. In 1924 he began lecturing in Physics at Durham University. In 1925 aged only 25 he was made a Professor of Physics at the University of Saskatchewan in Canada. In 1934 he was elected a Fellow of the Royal Society of Canada.

In 1935 he returned to Britain as Professor of Applied Physics at Glasgow University. In 1936 he was elected a Fellow of the Royal Society of Edinburgh. His proposers were Edward Taylor Jones, John Walton, Sir Edward Battersby Bailey and John Graham Kerr. He resigned and was re-elected in 1942. His second proposers were Edward Hindle, Sir Edmund Taylor Whittaker, James Pickering Kendall and James Ritchie.

In 1948 he left Britain again to become a Master at Rhodes University in South Africa in 1951 becoming both Principal and Vice Chancellor. Glasgow University gave him an honorary doctorate (LLD) in 1953.

He died in Birmingham in England on 2 May 1982.
