= List of Glasgow School of Art alumni =

Following is a list of Glasgow School of Art alumni.

== Academic ==
- Mary Maclean – photographer and Royal Academy lecturer
- Grace Wilson Melvin – artist and faculty member of the Glasgow School of Arts
- Josephine Haswell Miller – painter and faculty member of the Glasgow School of Arts

== Architecture and design ==
- Ian Callum – automotive designer
- Charles Rennie Mackintosh – designer and architect
- James McKissack – architect and photographer
- Jeffrey Rowbotham – architect
- Thomas S. Tait – architect

== Embroidery ==
- Anne Knox Arthur – embroiderer and 1939 Lauder Prize winner
- Helen Adelaide Lamb – embroiderer and painter
- Ann Macbeth – embroiderer and suffragist
- Jessie Newbery – textile artist and embroiderer

== Fashion design ==
- Pam Hogg – fashion designer
- Jonathan Saunders – fashion designer

== Film and television ==
- Peter Capaldi – actor, director, and 1995 Academy Awards winner for short film
- Robbie Coltrane – actor
- Muriel Gray – broadcaster, author, and journalist
- Jimmie Macgregor – television broadcaster and folksinger
- Alexander Mackendrick – film director
- Gillies MacKinnon – film director
- Iain McCaig – Hollywood storyboard artist, illustrator, and designer
- Eddie McConnell – documentary filmmaker
- Norman McLaren – Academy Award-winning animator and filmmaker
- May Miles Thomas – screenwriter and director
- Ewan Morrison – novelist, screenwriter, director, and winner of the Saltire Society Literary Award and the Scottish Mortgage Investment Trust Book Awards
- Donald Wilson – television writer and producer

== Illustration ==
- Christine Berrie – illustrator
- Emilio Coia – caricaturist
- Darren Cullen – artist and activist
- John Glashan – cartoonist and illustrator
- Jessie Marion King – illustrator
- Iain McCaig – illustrator, designer, and Hollywood storyboard artist
- Daisy Agnes McGlashan – writer and illustrator
- Stewart Orr – children's book illustrator and watercolour artist
- Frank Quitely – comics artist
- David Shrigley – artist and cartoonist
- Dyke White – cartoonist

== Literature and journalism ==
- John Byrne – playwright and artist
- Ian Hamilton Finlay – poet, artist, and Turner Prize nominee 1984
- Alasdair Gray – novelist, muralist, and author of Lanark: A Life in Four Books
- Liz Lochhead – playwright and poet
- Daisy Agnes McGlashan – writer and illustrator
- Ewan Morrison – novelist, screenwriter, director, and winner of the Saltire Society Literary Award and the Scottish Mortgage Investment Trust Book Awards
- Cordelia Oliver – journalist and art critic for The Guardian

== Metal working ==
- De Courcy Lewthwaite Dewar – enamelist and metalworker

== Music ==
- Fran Healy – musician in Glasgow-based band Travis
- Dougie Payne – musician and member of the band Travis
- Andy Dunlop – musician and member of the band Travis
- Bob Hardy – musician and bassist in Franz Ferdinand
- Scott Hutchison – musician and artist
- Rory Macdonald – musician, songwriter, and founding member of Runrig
- Jimmie Macgregor – folksinger and television broadcaster
- Tommy Reilly – musician and songwriter
- Sharleen Spiteri – singer-songwriter, guitarist, and lead vocalist of the Scottish pop-rock band Texas

== Performance and environmental art ==
- Jasleen Kaur – installation artist and Turner Prize winner
- Lili Reynaud-Dewar – installation and performance artist

== Painting ==
- Janet Macdonald Aitken – painter
- Ann Dunlop Alexander – painter
- Lena Alexander – painter
- Jessie Algie – botanical painter
- Mary Parsons Reid Allan – painter
- Edith Lovell Andrews – painter
- Lesley Banks – painter
- Sam Black – artist
- Robert Henderson Blyth – artist
- Leonard Boden – portrait painter
- Christine Borland – artist and 1997 Turner Prize Nominee
- Martin Boyce – artist, 2011 Turner Prize winner
- Roderick Buchanan – artist and 2000 Beck's Futures winner
- Nancy Jane Burton – painter
- Steven Campbell – artist
- Evelyn Carslaw – landscape painter
- Nathan Coley – artist and 2007 Turner Prize nominee
- Stephen Conroy – painter
- Gertrude Mary Coventry – portrait painter
- James Cowie – painter
- Hugh Adam Crawford – painter
- Ken Currie – artist
- Alexander Brownlie Docharty – artist
- Jessie Alexandra Dick – painter and teacher
- Joan Eardley – artist
- Christian Jane Fergusson – artist
- Ian Hamilton Finlay – poet, artist, and Turner Prize nominee 1984
- Amelia Beattie Forsyth – artist and Lauder Prize winner 1937
- Douglas Gordon – artist and 1996 Turner Prize winner
- Alexander Goudie – artist
- Norah Neilson Gray – artist
- Sir James Gunn – landscape and portrait painter
- Ilana Halperin – artist
- Peter Howson – artist
- Chantal Joffe – artist
- Violet McNeish Kay – painter
- Jessie Keppie – artist
- Annabel Kidston – artist
- Kathryn Kynoch – painter
- Annie Rose Laing – painter
- Elspeth Lamb – printmaker
- Jim Lambie – artist and 2005 Turner Prize nominee
- Andrew Law – portrait painter
- Laura Loudon – painter and 1939 Lauder Prize winner
- Tessa Lynch – artist
- Margaret Macdonald Mackintosh – artist
- Shona Macdonald – artist
- Philip Raskin – artist
- Elizabeth McDonald – portrait painter
- Jessie M. McGeehan – artist known for painting and mosaic work
- Alison McKenzie – painter and printmaker
- Sam McKinniss – contemporary figurative and abstract painter
- Bessie MacNicol – painter
- Josephine Haswell Miller – painter and faculty member of the Glasgow School of Arts
- Thomas Corsan Morton – artist
- Sheila Mullen – artist
- Louisa Ellen Perman - Scottish floral painter
- Ciara Phillips – artist
- Christopher Pratt – Canadian painter who designed the Newfoundland flag
- John Quinton Pringle – artist
- Charlotte Prodger – artist and 2018 Turner Prize recipient
- Jenny Saville – artist
- William Somerville Shanks – artist
- Lucy Skaer – artist and 2009 Turner Prize nominee
- Simon Starling – Turner Prize winning artist 2005
- Alison Watt – artist
- Cathy Wilkes – artist and 2008 Turner Prize nominee
- Richard Wright – artist and 2009 Turner Prize winner
- Kumi Yamashita – artist
- Jane Younger – painter

== Photography ==
- Harry Benson – photographer
- Mary Maclean – photographer and Royal Academy lecturer
- Oscar Marzaroli – photographer

== Politics and government ==
- David Donaldson – Painter and Limner to Her Majesty the Queen in Scotland
- Cathy Jamieson – politician
- Ann Macbeth – suffragist and embroiderer
- Alexander Stoddart – Sculptor in Ordinary for Scotland

== Printmaking ==
- Jean D. Burns – artist and printmaker
- Robert Colquhoun – painter and printmaker
- Anna Findlay – artist and printmaker
- Chica Macnab – painter, wood-engraver, and printmaker
- Alison McKenzie – painter and printmaker
- Jacki Parry – printmaker and founding member of Glasgow Print Studio
- Viola Paterson – wood engraver and woodcut artist
- Margaret Bruce Wells – printmaker

== Sculpture ==
- Phyllis Archibald – sculptor
- Douglas Robertson Bisset – sculptor
- William Kellock Brown – sculptor
- Michelle de Bruin – sculptor, stonecarver and lettercutter
- Hannah Frank – artist and sculptor
- Alex Frost – sculptor
- Thomas Symington Halliday – sculptor and stained glass artist
- Benno Schotz – sculptor
- Andy Scott – sculptor
- Marc Bijl – sculptor, painter, and installation artist

== Stained glass ==
- Alan Gourley – painter and stained glass artist
- Thomas Symington Halliday – sculptor and stained glass artist
- Alf Webster – stain glass artist

== Other ==
- Doris Grant – nutritionist
- Toby Webster – art dealer
