= Lippincott Mountain =

Mountain in the American state of California

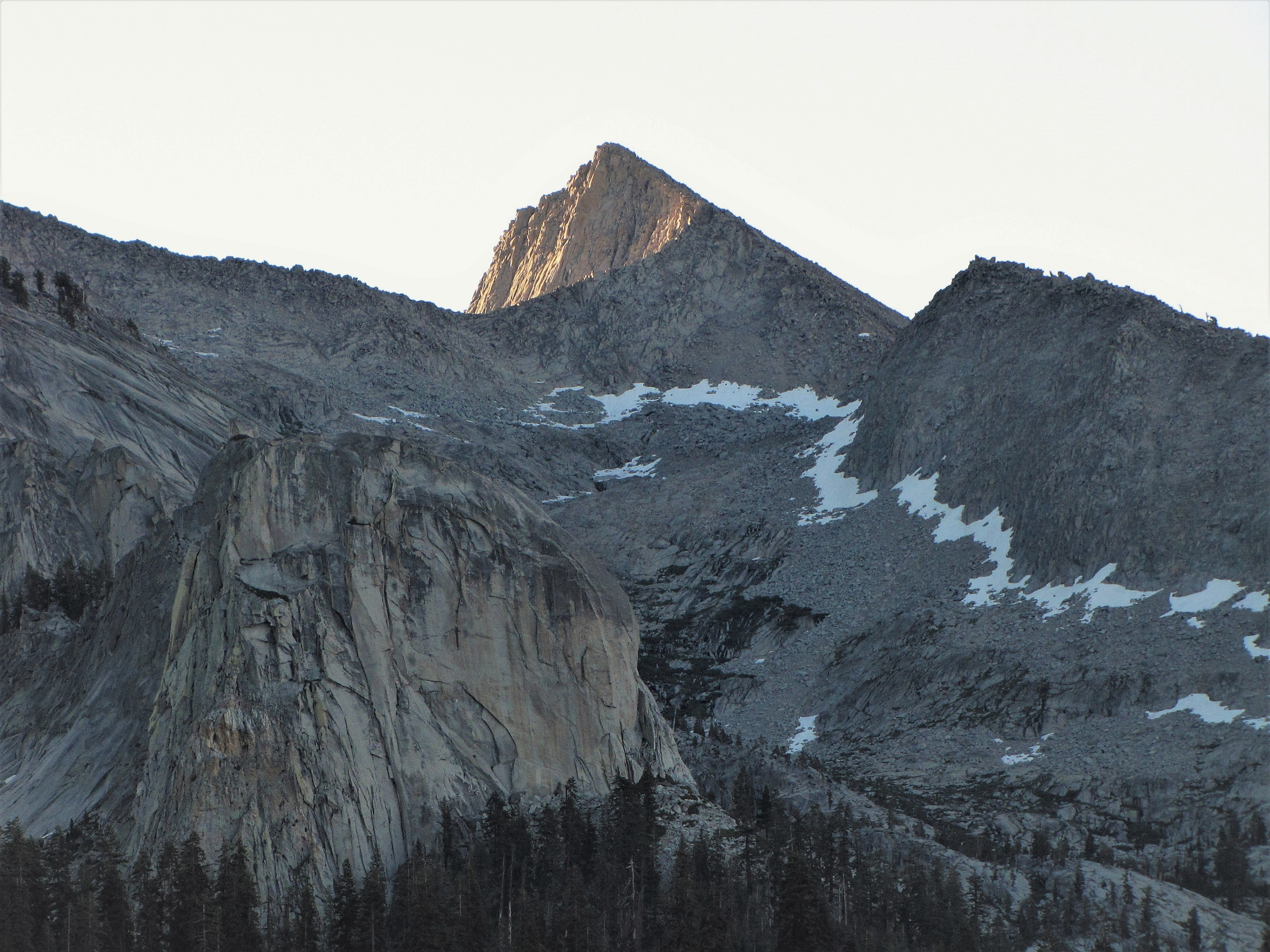
- Northwest aspect, from Bearpaw Camp

Highest point
- Elevation: 12,265 ft (3,738 m)
- Prominence: 1,225 ft (373 m)
- Parent peak: Black Kaweah (13,686 ft)
- Isolation: 3.11 mi (5.01 km)
- Listing: Sierra Peaks Section
- Coordinates: 36°31′16″N 118°33′47″W

Naming
- Etymology: Joseph Barlow Lippincott

Geography
- Location within California Location within the United States
- Location: Sequoia National Park; Tulare County; California, U.S.
- Parent range: Sierra Nevada; Great Western Divide
- Topo map: USGS Triple Divide Peak

Geology
- Rock age: Cretaceous
- Mountain type: Fault block
- Rock type: granitic

Climbing
- First ascent: 1922 Norman Clyde
- Easiest route: class 2 East ridge

Lippincott Mountain is a mountain summit with an elevation of 12,264 feet (3,738 m), located on the Great Western Divide of the Sierra Nevada mountain range, in Tulare County of northern California. It is situated in Sequoia National Park, 1.5 miles (2.4 km) north of Mount Eisen, and 1.7 miles (2.7 km) south of Eagle Scout Peak. Topographic relief is significant as the east aspect rises 2,660 feet (810 m) above Big Arroyo in 1.5 mile. Lippincott Mountain ranks as the 351st highest summit in California. The High Sierra Trail traverses below the eastern slope of this mountain, providing an approach option. The southeast slope and east ridge are class 2, and the northwest ridge is a class 3 scramble.

== History ==
This mountain's name was officially adopted in 1928 by the United States Board on Geographic Names to honor Joseph Barlow Lippincott (1864–1942), hydrographer for the United States Geological Survey and the United States Reclamation Service, from 1894 to 1904. Lippincott had a role in the California water wars and construction of the Los Angeles Aqueduct which diverted water from the Owens Valley to Los Angeles. The first ascent of the summit was made in 1922 by Norman Clyde, who is credited with 130 first ascents, most of which were in the Sierra Nevada.

== Climate ==
According to the Köppen climate classification system, Lippincott Mountain is located in an alpine climate zone. Most weather fronts originate in the Pacific Ocean, and travel east toward the Sierra Nevada mountains. As fronts approach, they are forced upward by the peaks, causing them to drop their moisture in the form of rain or snowfall onto the range (orographic lift). Precipitation runoff from the mountain drains west into tributaries of Kaweah River, and east to Big Arroyo, which is a tributary of the Kern River.

== See also ==
- List of mountain peaks of California

== Gallery ==
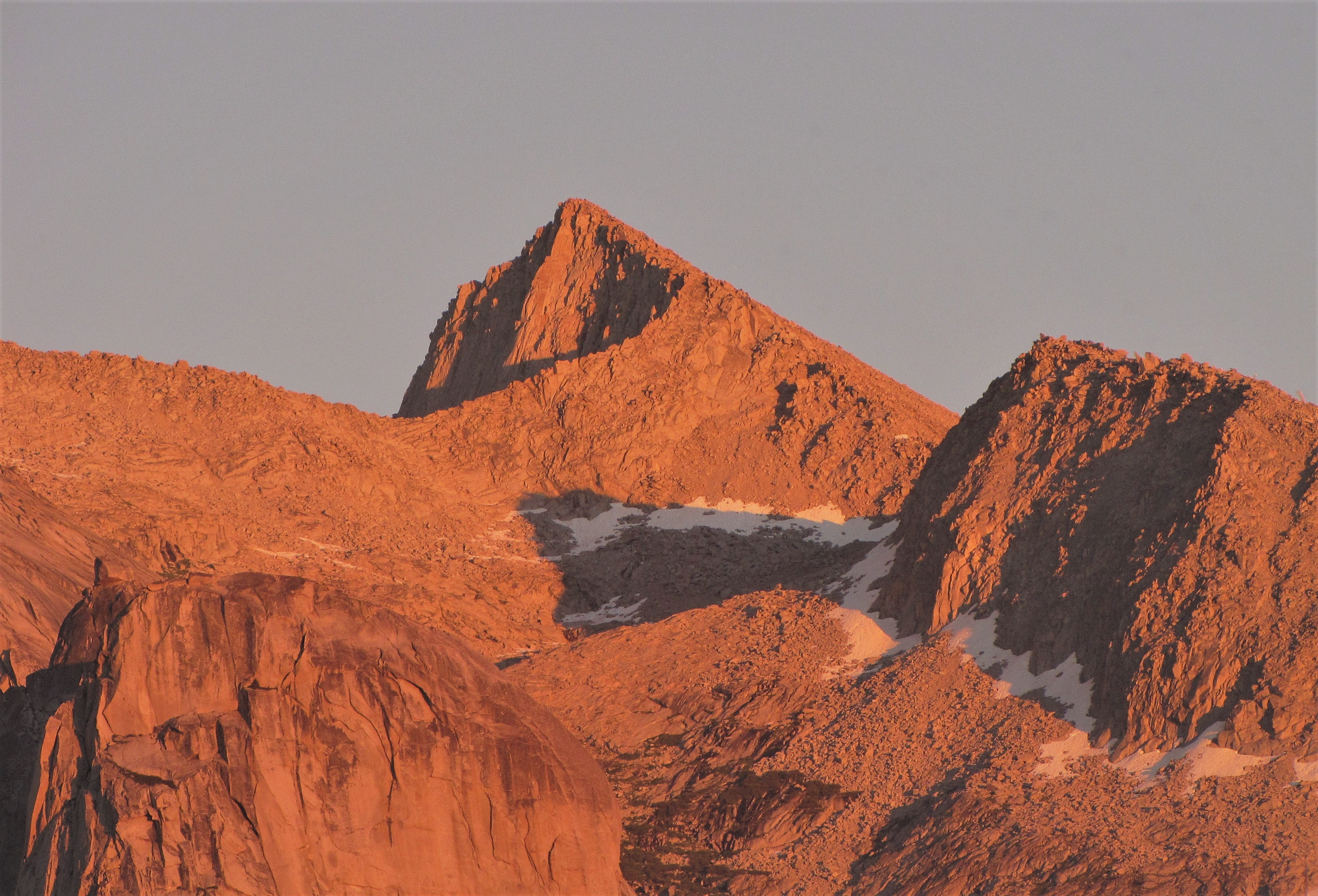
Northwest aspect and sunset alpenglow, from Bearpaw Meadow High Sierra Camp

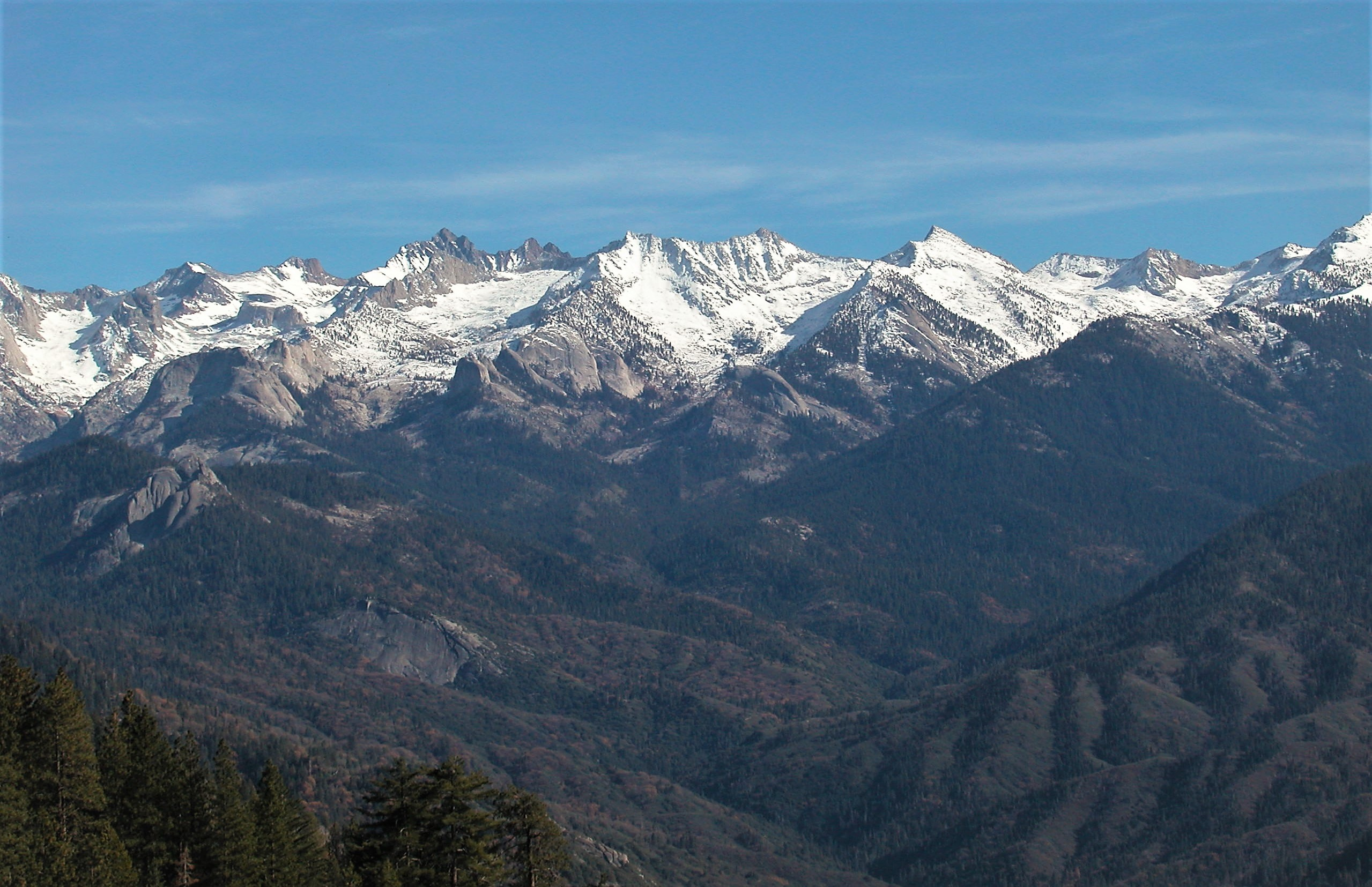
West aspect of Lippincott Mountain (right of center), from Moro Rock

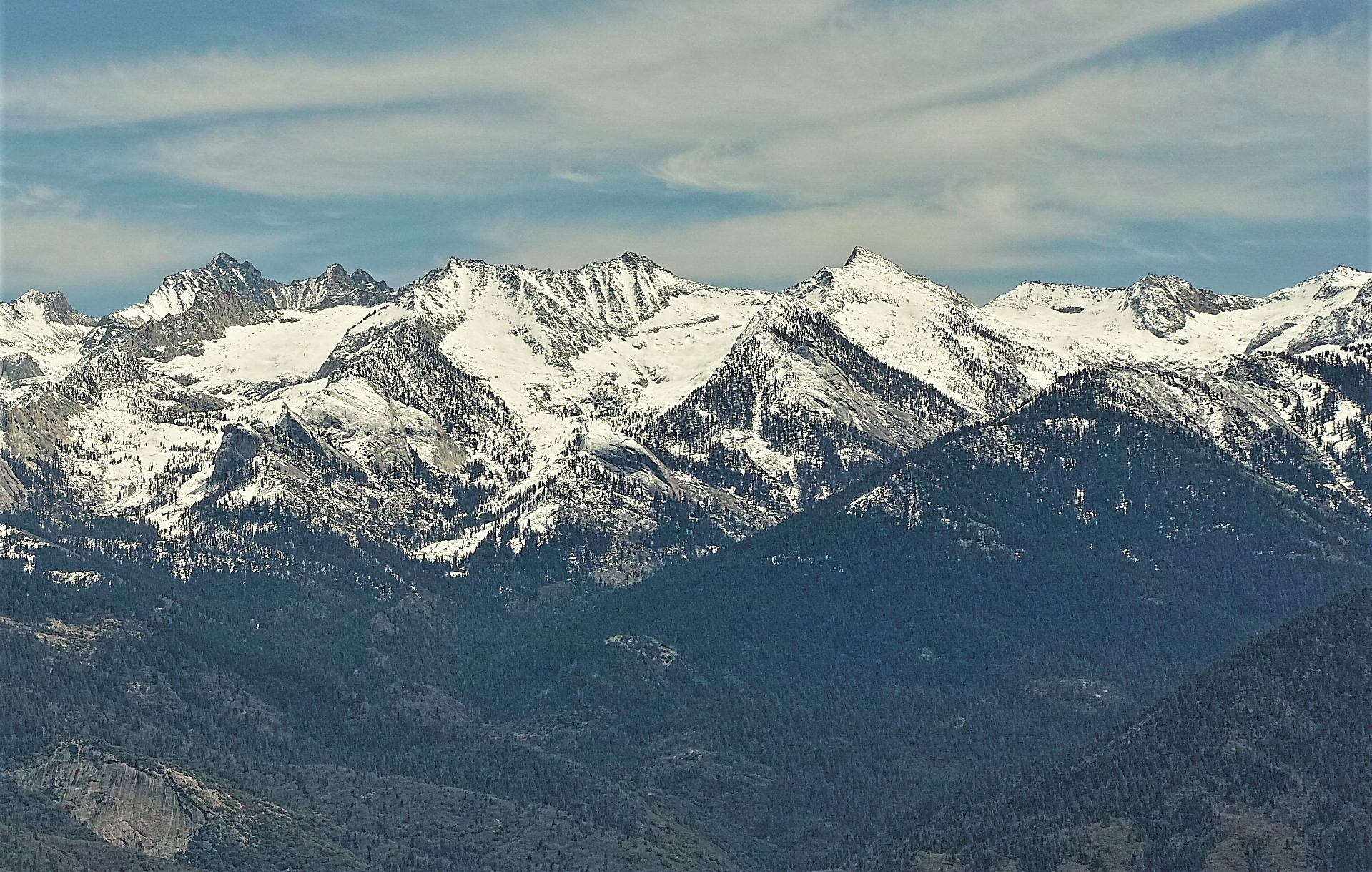
West aspect of Lippincott Mountain (right of center), from Moro Rock
