= Mary Maclean (disambiguation) =

Mary Maclean, MacLean, or McLean may refer to:

- Mary Ann MacLean (1931–2005), Scottish occultist
- Mary Dunlop Maclean (1873–1912), American writer, journalist, and editor of The Crisis
- Mary Hancock McLean (1861–1930), American physician and missionary
- Mary Maclean (1962–2018), English artist, photographer, and Royal Academy lecturer
- Mary MacLean Hindmarsh (1921–2000), Australian botanist
- Mary McLean (1866–1949), New Zealand school principal

== See also ==
- Pantjiti Mary McLean (born c. 1930), Ngaatjajarra Aboriginal Australian artist
