= Elizabeth MacDonald (disambiguation) =

Elizabeth MacDonald is an American financial journalist. Elizabeth MacDonald may also refer to:

- Elizabeth Roberts MacDonald (1864–1922), Canadian writer
- Elizabeth Peet McIntosh (formerly Elizabeth Peet MacDonald, 1915–2015), American espionage officer and author
- Liz MacDonald (born 1962), American space weather scientist
- Betty MacDonald (Anne Elizabeth Campbell Bard, 1907–1958), American children's author
- Elizabeth McDonald, American-Scottish painter

== See also ==
- Liz McDonald, fictional character on the British soap opera Coronation Street
