= 2011 Turner Prize =

British prize for contemporary art

The prize exhibition was held at the Baltic Centre for Contemporary Art in Gateshead from 21 October 2011 to 8 January 2012, the first to be held outside London since the 2007 Turner Prize exhibition was held at Tate Liverpool, and the first time the exhibition has ever been held at a non-Tate venue.

The 2011 Turner Prize was won by Martin Boyce for his installation Do Words Have Voices The other nominees were Karla Black, Martin Boyce, Hilary Lloyd and George Shaw.

The prize jury for 2011 was Penelope Curtis (Director of Tate Britain in London), Katrina Brown (Director of The Common Guild in Glasgow), Vasif Kortun (Director of SALT (institution) in Istanbul), Nadia Schneider (Director of Kunsthaus Glarus in Glarus) and Godfrey Worsdale (Director of Baltic Centre for Contemporary Art in Gateshead).

The prize ceremony was interrupted by the international streaker Mark Roberts who was hired by the artist Benedikt Dichgans.

149,770 people visited the exhibition at the Baltic making it the most visited Turner Prize exhibition ever.
