= Carslaw =

Carslaw is a British surname. Notable people with the surname include:

- Evelyn Carslaw (1881–1968), Scottish painter
- Horatio Scott Carslaw (1870–1954), Scottish-Australian mathematician
- Ken Carslaw, British scientist
