= Józef Sękalski =

Polish painter, printer, etcher and illustrator

Józef Sękalski (1904–1972), also known as Josef Sekalski and Juozapas Senkalskis, was a Polish painter, printer, etcher and illustrator who lived and worked in Scotland.

== Biography ==
Sękalski was born in Turek, central Poland. He joined the Polish Forces in exile in the United Kingdom during World War II. He remained in St. Andrews, in Fife, Scotland, after the war, with his partner Roberta Hodges, a painter herself. Sękalski constructed his printing press himself, from the back axle of a car, a tuck box and some odd items and built the machine on the floor of his apartment at 29 North Street St. Andrews. They had their studio in their own home, The Bell Rock House, at St. Andrews Harbour. Along with Alison and Winifred McKenzie and Annabel Kidston, he belonged to the St. Andrews Group of wood engravers.

== Artistic career ==
Sękalski taught at Glasgow School of Art, and taught Graphic Design at the Dundee Institute of Art and Technology, the later Duncan Of Jordanstone College Of Art, University Of Dundee.

Sękalski illustrated works including A call from Warsaw: an anthology of underground Warsaw poetry (J. Harasowska, 1944). This book was first printed secretly under German occupation in Warsaw in 1940 and was reprinted by the Polish library in 1942. He also provided wood-cut engravings for St. Andrews: Its Character and Tradition (1951), published by The St. Andrews Preservation Trust, and illustrated F.C. Anstruther's Old Polish Legends (1997).

His work is held by museums and galleries, including the McManus Galleries in Dundee.
