= Mount Eisen =

Mountain in California, United States

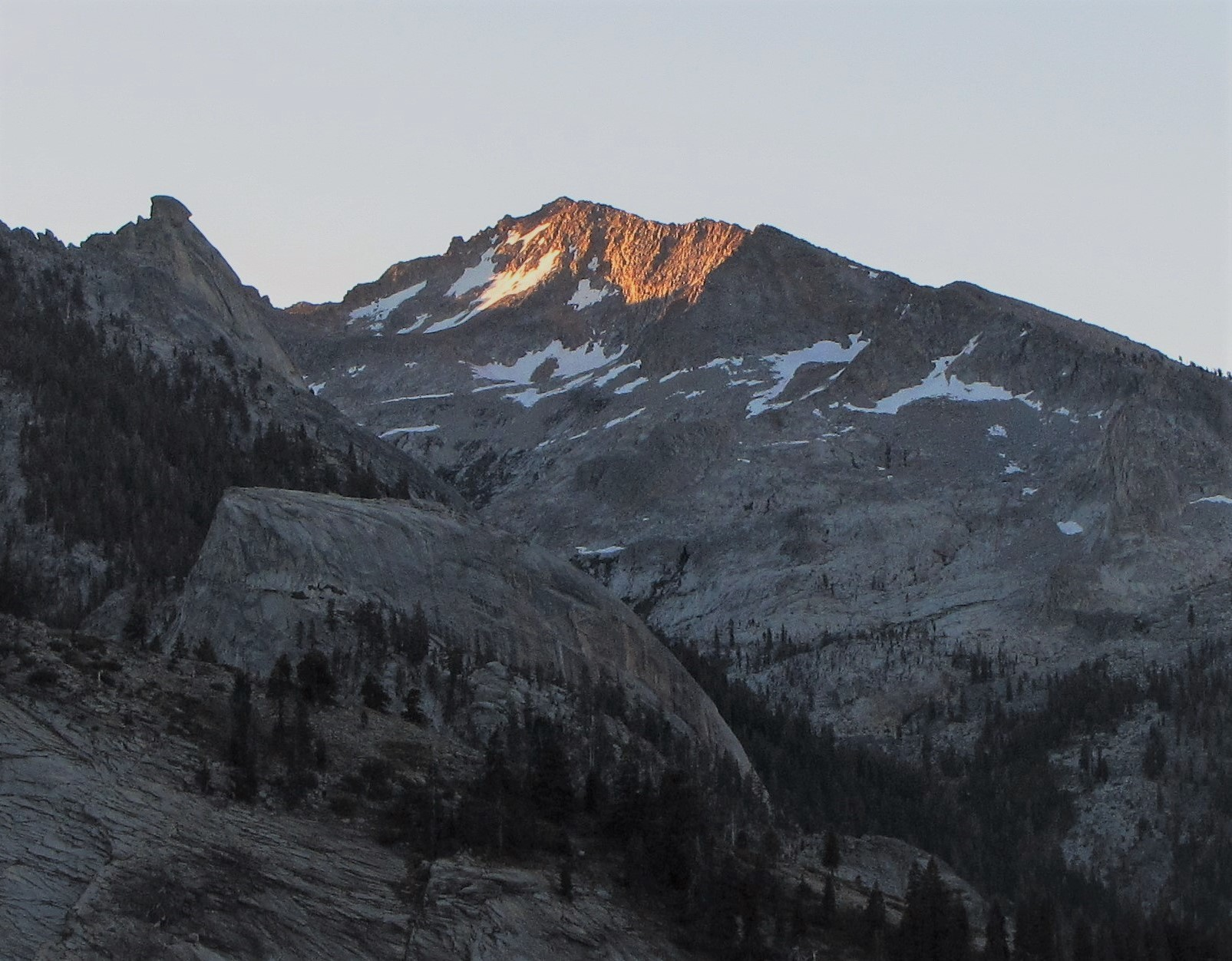
- North summit at sunrise

Highest point
- Elevation: 12,185 ft (3,714 m)
- Prominence: 480 ft (150 m)
- Parent peak: Lippincott Mountain (12,265 ft)
- Isolation: 1.63 mi (2.62 km)
- Listing: Sierra Peaks Section
- Coordinates: 36°29′54″N 118°34′07″W

Naming
- Etymology: Gustav Eisen

Geography
- Location within California Location within the United States
- Location: Sequoia National Park; Tulare County; California, U.S.
- Parent range: Sierra Nevada; Great Western Divide
- Topo map: USGS Mineral King

Geology
- Rock age: Cretaceous
- Mountain type: Fault block
- Rock type: granitic

Climbing
- First ascent: 1949
- Easiest route: class 2 Southeast ridge

Mount Eisen is a 12,185-foot-elevation (3,714-meter) double summit mountain located on the Great Western Divide of the Sierra Nevada mountain range, in Tulare County of northern California. It is situated in Sequoia National Park, 1.6 miles (2.6 km) south of Lippincott Mountain. Mount Eisen ranks as the 380th highest summit in California. Topographic relief is significant as the south aspect rises 3,500 feet (1,100 meters) above Pinto Lake in one mile. The summit can be reached from the southeast ridge via a long class 2 hike from Black Rock Pass.

== History ==
This mountain was named by the National Park Service, and officially adopted in 1941 by the United States Board on Geographic Names to remember Gustav Eisen (1847–1940), scientist and early conservationist, who played an important role in the establishment of Sequoia National Park. He was a Sierra Club member for 48 years, and his ashes are interred on the north side of the mountain near Redwood Meadow. The first ascent of the summit was made July 15, 1949, by Howard Parker, Mildred Jentsch, Ralph Youngberg, and Martha Ann McDuffie.

== Climate ==
According to the Köppen climate classification system, Mount Eisen is located in an alpine climate zone. Most weather fronts originate in the Pacific Ocean, and travel east toward the Sierra Nevada mountains. As fronts approach, they are forced upward by the peaks, causing them to drop their moisture in the form of rain or snowfall onto the range (orographic lift). Precipitation runoff from the mountain drains west into tributaries of Kaweah River, and east to Big Arroyo, which is a tributary of the Kern River.

== Gallery ==
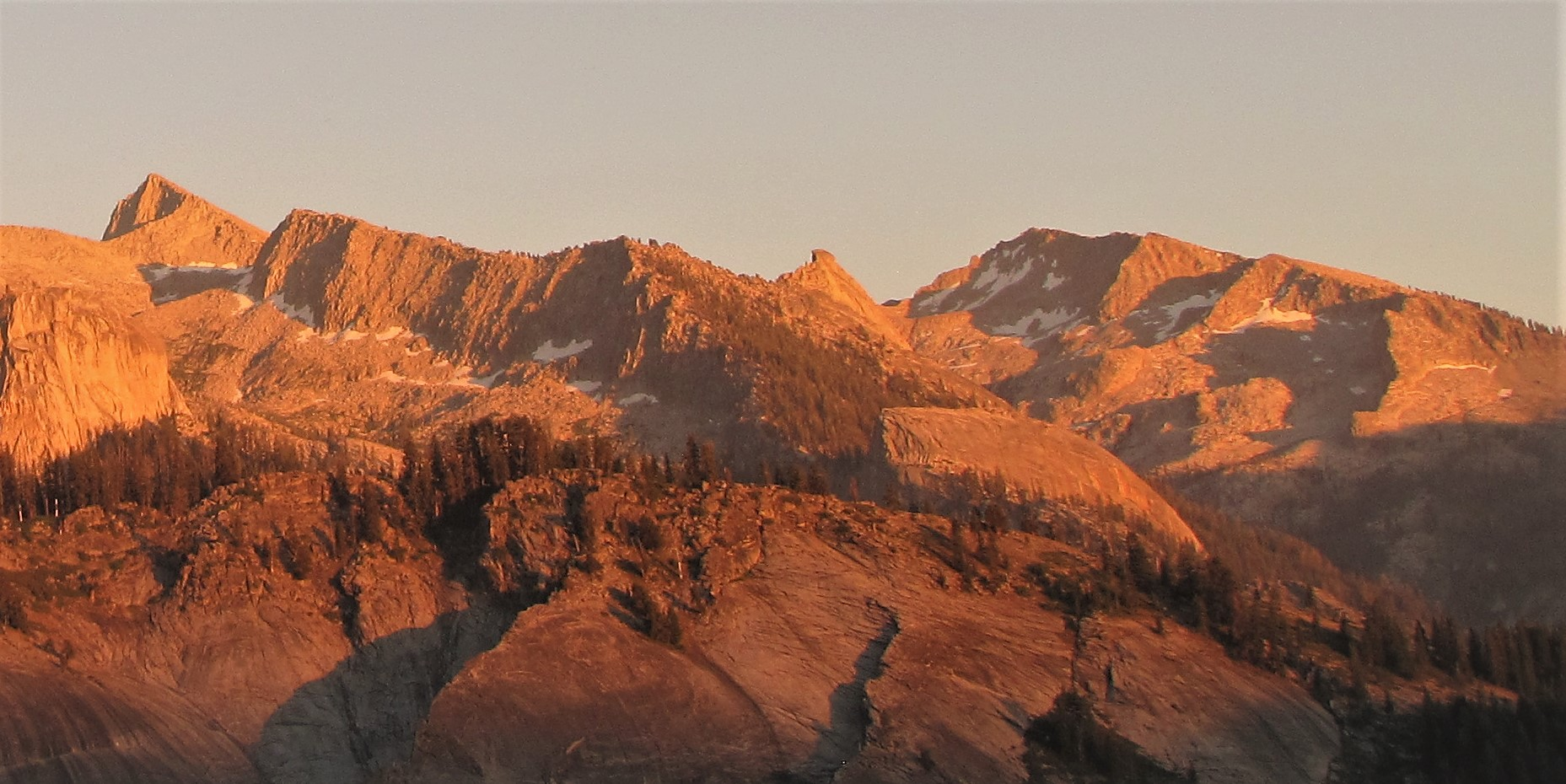
Lippincott Mountain (left), Mount Eisen (right), seen at sunset from Bearpaw Meadow High Sierra Camp

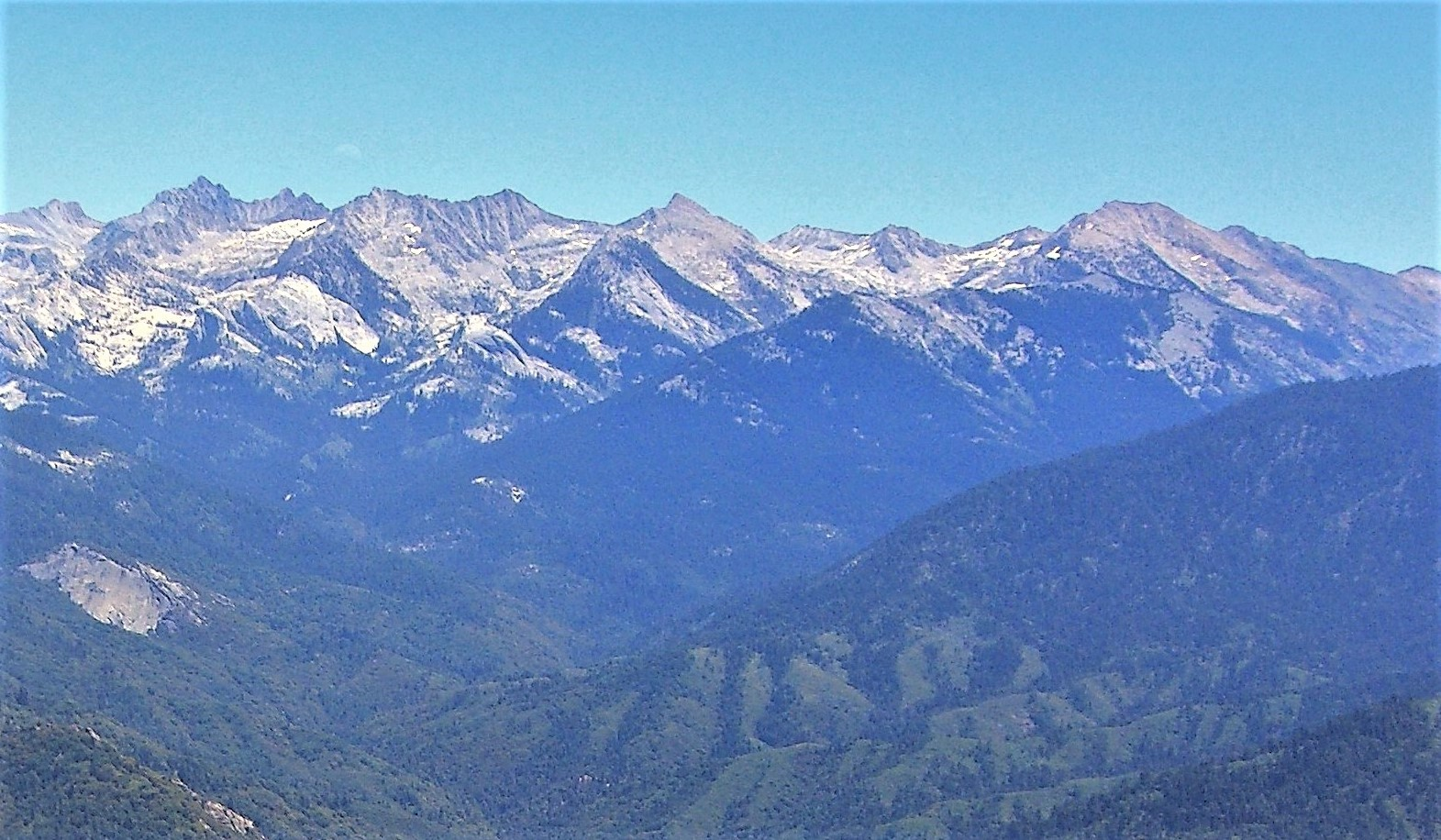
Great Western Divide seen from Moro Rock, Mt. Eisen furthest right

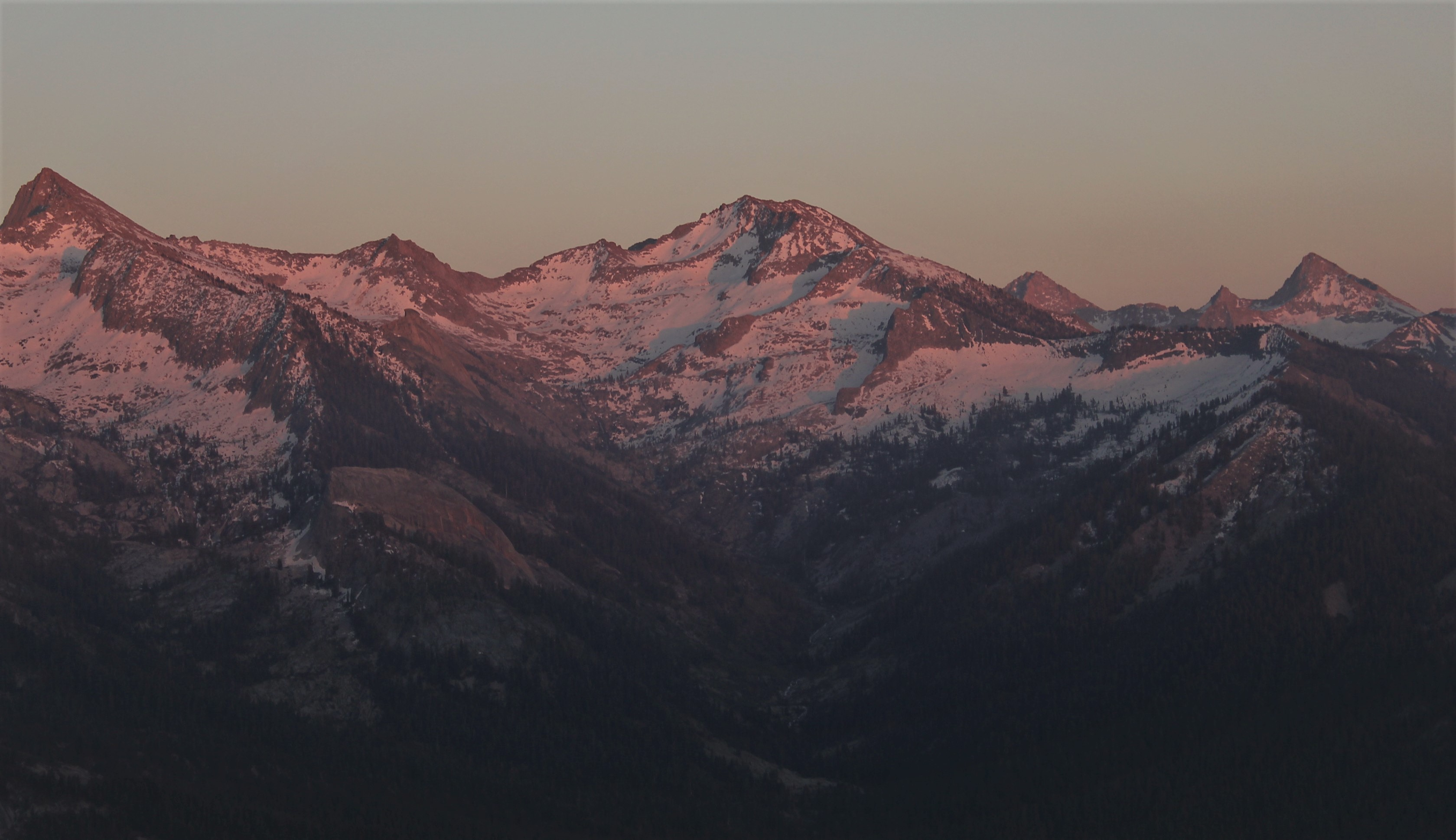
Eisen alpenglow

== See also ==
- List of mountain peaks of California
