= Violet Meikle McGlashan =

Scottish painter (1872–1905)

- Born: Violet Meikle McGlashan; 3 December 1872; Glasgow, Scotland
- Died: 18 December 1905 (aged 33); Kaweah, California, U.S.
- Known for: Painting
- Relatives: Daisy Agnes McGlashan, sister William Smith Anderson, brother-in-law

Violet Meikle McGlashan (3 December 1872 – 18 December 1905) was a Scottish painter. She is one of the McGlashan-Anderson artistic dynasty of the Glasgow School of Art.

== Life ==
Violet Meikle McGlashan was born in Glasgow in 1872. Her father, John McGlashan (c. 1844 – 16 June 1920), manufactured underclothing. Her mother was Agnes Meikle (c. 1848 – 9 January 1929). They married on 13 June 1870 in Cathcart, Glasgow.

McGlashan's younger sister, Daisy Agnes McGlashan, was born in 1879.

=== Personal life ===
McGlashan married James Claude Wilson on 23 April 1896 at 50 Princes Square, Strathbungo in Glasgow. Their son, Owen McGlashan Wilson (18 August 1904 – April 1979), was born in Milngavie.

McGlashan travelled to the United States, arriving in New York on 15 May 1905. She died on 18 December 1905 in Kaweah, California.

== Art ==
McGlashan studied at the Glasgow School of Art from 1888 to 1893. While at the Glasgow School of Art, she stayed at 15 North Portland Street in Glasgow.

McGlashan won Haldane bursaries from 1889 to 1891.

== Works ==
Watercolour sketches by McGlashan are held by Glasgow School of Art in their archives.
