= Robert de Grimston =

British occultist

Robert De Grimston
- Born: Robert de Grimston Moor; 10 August 1935 (age 91); Shanghai, China
- Spouse: Mary Ann Maclean (m. 1963; div. 1974)

Robert de Grimston (also known as Robert Moor and The Teacher; born 10 August 1935) is a British occultist who was founder of the Process Church of The Final Judgment (popularly referred to as The Process) in the 1960s. He was born in Shanghai, China.

Created in partnership with Mary Ann MacLean (known as "The Oracle" in the Process Church), they met while they were members of the Church of Scientology in London. The Process held that God is made of four separate parts equally worthy of worship — Jehovah, Christ, Lucifer and Satan — and that a person must worship all four in succession to gain enlightenment. Their newsletter was in vogue during the era of flower power, and featured articles about the Rolling Stones, Charles Manson and the like.

While de Grimston is remembered as "The Christ of Carnaby Street" and as the head of the Process Church, some scholars believe that, "far from being the uncontested leader of The Process, Robert de Grimston was but the mouthpiece of Mary Ann. [Robert was] the (not-so) charismatic facade, behind whom the real leader of The Process [Mary Ann] could act, detached and isolated from the majority of members."

Robert and Mary Ann divorced in 1974, at which point Mary Ann and several original members of the group continued as the Foundation Church of the Millennium, which later became Best Friends Animal Society.
