= Xtul =

Coordinates: 21°15′N 89°49′W

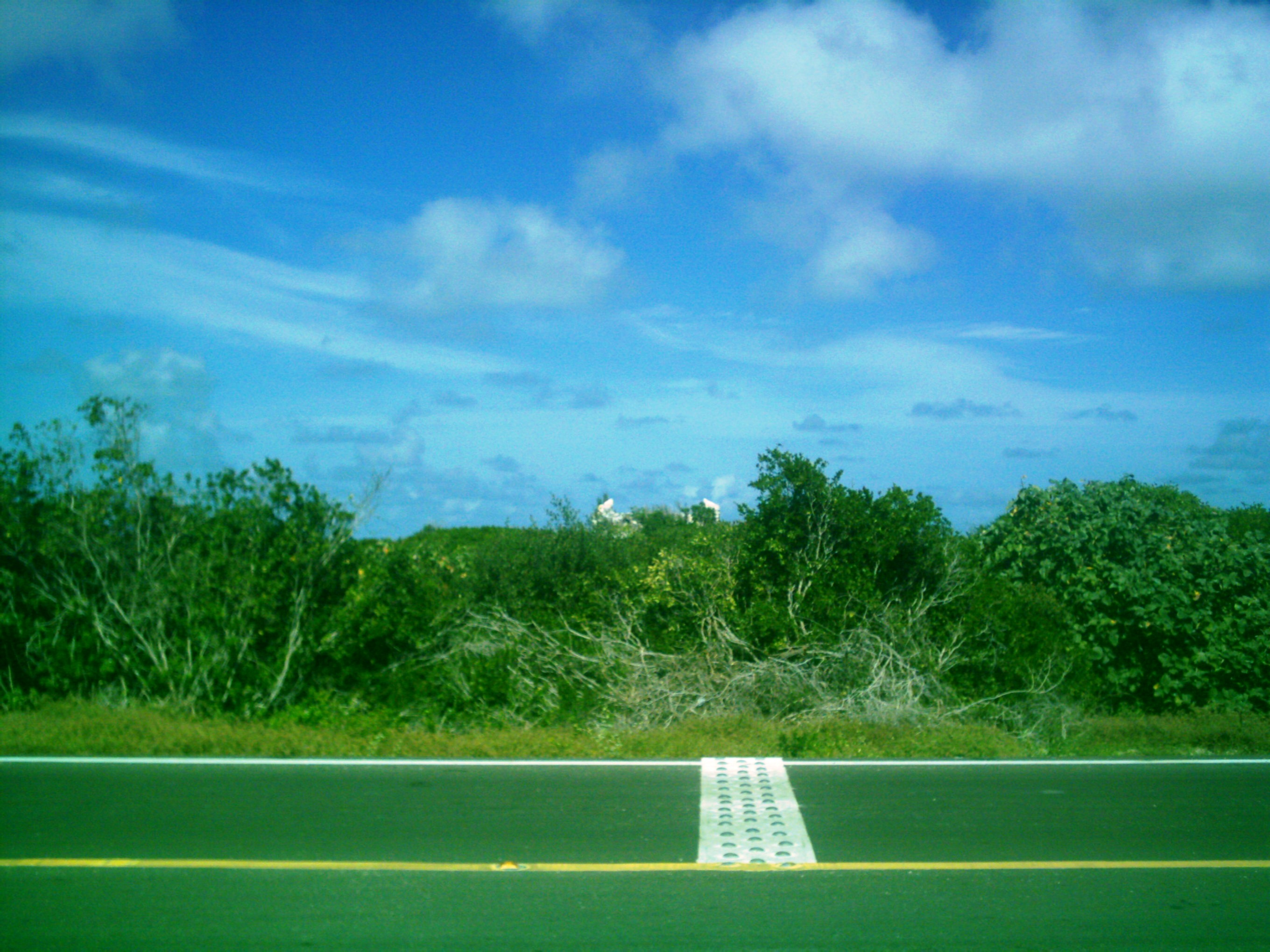
Image of a road in Xtul

Xtul, (pronounced /ʃtul/), is a small village in the state of Yucatán, Mexico. It is on the north Gulf of Mexico coast, located 24 km (15 mi) west of the city of Progreso inside of the Progreso municipality, about halfway along the road between Sisal and Progreso. The village, like a few others located on the gulf coast, was a location where salt was harvested from the tidal pools in the area; the salt trade in this area dates back to Pre-Columbian times.

Xtul is noted as the location where some 30 members of The Process Church of The Final Judgment went in 1966. They set up camp in an abandoned salt factory. While there they were hit by Hurricane Inez. The resulting storm lasted for three days.
