= Process Church of the Final Judgement =

Religious group in the 1960s and 1970s

The logo used by the original Process Church of the Final Judgement

The Process Church of the Final Judgement, also known as the Process Church, was a British religious group established in 1966 and disestablished in the 1970s. Its founders were the British couple Mary Ann MacLean and Robert de Grimston, who spread the group's practices across parts of the United Kingdom and United States in the late 1960s and early 1970s. The Process Church's beliefs have been described as "a kind of neo-Gnostic theology".

MacLean and de Grimston initially met as members of the Church of Scientology in the early 1960s; the duo were ejected from the Church in 1962 and married the following year. They started a brief Scientology splinter group named Compulsions Analysis, which incorporated new religious elements; this developed into the Process Church, which was established in London in 1966. Its members initially lived in a commune in Mayfair, West London before moving to Xtul in Mexico's Yucatan peninsula. They later established a base of operations in the United States in New Orleans. Prosecutors investigating the Los Angeles murders committed by the Manson Family in 1969 suggested that there were links between Charles Manson and the Process Church, and despite the connection being unproven and unfounded, the allegations subsequently damaged the Church's reputation.

Authors who have written about the group include Ed Sanders, journalist Maury Terry, and in the early 1970s, the sociologist William Sims Bainbridge. In 1974, MacLean and de Grimston separated. The latter tried to continue the group with a small following, but this folded in 1979. MacLean retained the allegiance of the majority of Church members, later reforming the group as the Foundation Church of the Millennium (and a series of other names), which focused explicitly on Christian faith. In 1982, the Foundation Faith of God moved its base to Utah, where it established an animal rescue refuge in Kanab.

== History ==
=== Background ===
Mary Ann MacLean, born in 1931, grew up in Glasgow. Various accounts have said that she had spent a year in the United States, had a relationship with the boxer Sugar Ray Robinson, and worked as a high-end prostitute in London, servicing prominent figures in British business and politics.

Robert Moor was born in Shanghai in 1935, relocating to Britain in his infancy. Moor joined the Cavalry, serving from 1954 to 1958.

MacLean joined Scientology, and began working as an auditor at the London branch of the Church of Scientology. In 1962, Maclean and Moor met for the first time at the London Branch. They split with the Church of Scientology in 1962, and were married in 1963.

=== Foundation: 1963–1966 ===
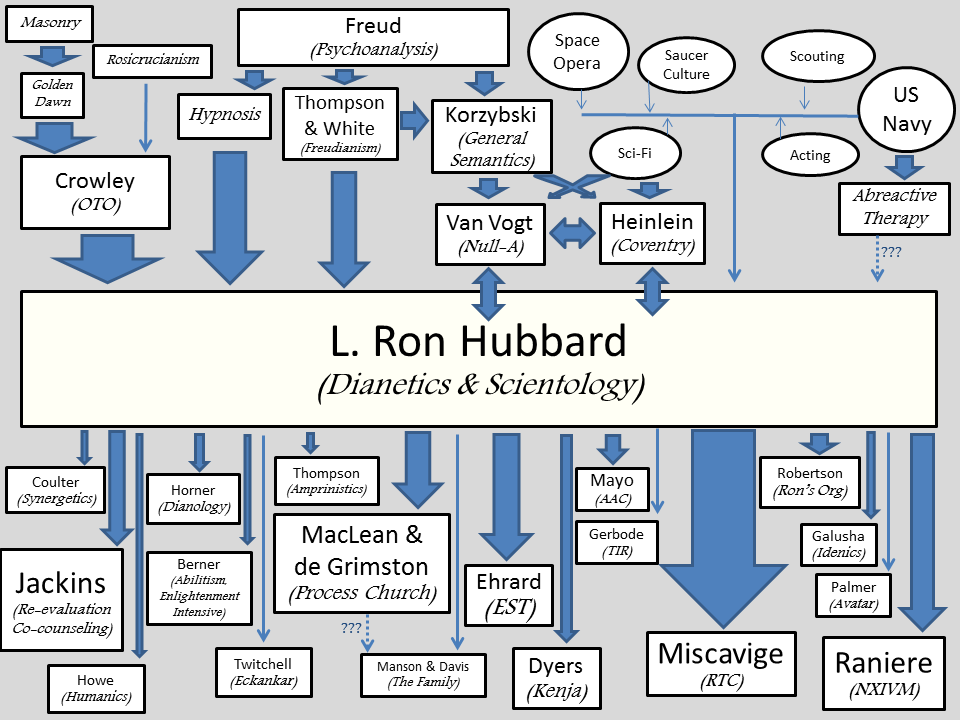
L. Ron Hubbard's beliefs and practices, drawn from a diverse set of sources, influenced numerous offshoots, splinter-groups, and new movements, including the Process Church of the Final Judgment.

Together they set up Compulsions Analysis, a group which utilised both the methods of L. Ron Hubbard's Scientology and the ideas of the psychologist Alfred Adler. In establishing this company, they were financially assisted by a lawyer friend. Moor changed his name to Robert de Grimston.

Moor distinguished the methods of Compulsions Analysis from Scientology in that it did not claim that its benefits were "infinite", stating that "we are not offering super powers, but a means that people can live on this side more effectively".

In 1966, the regular clients of Compulsions Analysis formed into a new group, The Process, which took on an increasingly religious character. In March 1966, twenty-five members of the Process moved into a commune at 2 Balfour Place in Mayfair, an affluent area in the West End of London. In May, the group left London and relocated to a remote area. On 23 June, around 30 Church members—accompanied by their six Alsatian dogs—moved to Nassau in the Bahamas. From there, they spent the rest of the summer seeking a more permanent location.

In September 1966, the group members moved to Mexico City. They obtained an old bus and began driving across the Yucatan Peninsula for a place to settle. They found a location known as Xtul; its name meant "the end" in the Mayan language, and the group took this as a portent that they should settle there. They set about establishing a community, although would only remain there for a month. They faced opposition from both locals and from the parents of several Church members, who enlisted anti-cult groups to try and recuperate their children through legal means. It was while there that the group clarified its hierarchical structure, with the De Grimstons at the top, who were referred to as "the Omega", followed by those regarded as masters, then priests, then prophets, and finally "messengers". In late September, a tropical hurricane devastated their settlement, and while some of them elected to stay, the De Grimstons and most of their followers decided to leave. The Yucatan experience remained an important part of the Process Church's own mythology. After that point, there would be a crucial division within the group between those who had gone through the Xtul experience and those who had not.

=== Establishing a presence in the United States: 1966–1973 ===
By November 1966, most of the Process members were back in London. Between the end of that year and 1967, the Process began to operate as a church. It became increasingly evangelistic and focused on attracting new members. It opened a library and an all-night coffee shop known as Satan's Cavern. It also began issuing a magazine, at first titled The Common Market and later renamed The Process. The Church's activities attracted the interest of a number of celebrities active in the realms of music and cinema, among them Marianne Faithfull.

In the early 1970s, the sociologist William Sims Bainbridge studied the group, producing an in-depth account of its activities.

In 1967 and 1968, the De Grimstons made various further international travels, spending time in East Asia, the United States, Germany and Italy; in the latter they visited the ruins of the Abbey of Thelema on Cefalu, the commune established in the 1920s by British occultist Aleister Crowley. From late 1968 onward, they began spending most of their time in the United States. The Church opened chapters in many U.S. cities, the first of which was in New Orleans, where the remaining members of the Xtul colony settled. Several European chapters followed, in Munich, Rome, and London. In the early 1970s it opened its largest chapter, in Toronto, Canada. Introvigne thought that at its maximum capacity, the Process Church had "a few hundred active members."

==== San Francisco and the Charles Manson Murders ====
During its existence, the Process Church attracted much publicity. In urban myth, the Process Church came to be associated with ritual murders, although no evidence of any such connection was ever forthcoming. Rumours spread that a number of Alsatians had been sacrificed around San Francisco, with these actions sometimes being associated with the Process Church, which kept Alsatians as pets. Gavin Baddeley later related that the Process Church "has become legendary, both in the annals of hippie history and Satanic lore".

One could make the argument that due to its extreme views and insular arrogance, The Process Church had itself to blame for the smears and resulting hysteria. But the fallout of this failed suit loomed large in the cult's toning down of its public face, and clamming up in public dialogue about its history.

— Adam Parfrey

Police investigating the Tate-LaBianca Murders which were carried out by members of the Manson Family suspected a possible connection between the Family's leader Charles Manson and the Process Church. When Vincent Bugliosi, the prosecutor of the Manson trial, asked Manson if he knew Moor, he responded: "You're looking at him. Moor and I are one and the same". Two members of the Church subsequently visited Bugliosi to stress that the group had nothing to do with Manson or his Family. Manson's visitor's records indicate that the following day he was visited by the same two members. The Church then included a brief article on Manson in the 1971 Death issue of its magazine, in which it included a short essay by Manson himself next to another by the Roman Catholic writer Malcolm Muggeridge.

Bugliosi later suggested in his book Helter Skelter that Manson may have borrowed philosophically from the Process Church. Although no connection between the Process Church and Manson was ever substantiated, the group's reputation was damaged by the association. The number of donations received began to decline and Church members sometimes received abuse in public. To shift the group's image, its leaders played down their image of black garments and Alsatians and presented a softer interpretation of their four divinities doctrine to limit the Satanic elements.

In his 1972 book The Family, Ed Sanders alleged that Manson had been a member of the Process Church, as evidence citing the fact that Manson once lived in the same road as the Church's San Francisco location. That year, the Church took legal action against Sanders and his U.S. publisher E. P. Dutton in the United States District Court for the Northern District of Illinois; the allegation was subsequently retracted from future printings of The Family. It also brought legal action with the book's British publisher, although in a British court, the publisher won the case. By the late 1970s—when the Church itself had disbanded—it was common for anti-Satanist literature to allege that Manson was a member of the group and that both were linked to blood sacrifices. In his 1974 book America Bewitched, author Daniel Logan cited the Process Church alongside Manson, the Church of Satan, and the British occultist Aleister Crowley. Journalist Maury Terry linked the Process Church to Ordo Templi Orientis and claimed both as part of a grand Satanic conspiracy in his 1987 book The Ultimate Evil.

Critics were skeptical of Terry's claims; Baddeley described Terry as "a sensationalist reporter with a nose for good scare stories" Historian Mitch Horowitz has observed that, "The cultural story around Charles Manson and The Process Church is at once confounding and simple, reflecting the Rorschach tendency of commentators, observers, and writers to believe what they wish, with sometimes-bounding leaps of supposition," and furthermore that, "Terry’s connections between The Process and the Sam murders rest on distantly circumstantial symbols, conversations with sympathetic fellow travelers, and leaps of supposition greater than those ventured by Sanders."

Claims about the Process Church being linked to a vast Satanic conspiracy and wide range of crimes were also endorsed by members of the LaRouche movement.

A detailed account of the history of and life within the Process Church as told by a participant-observer is contained in William S. Bainbridge's book Satan's Power. A sociologist, Bainbridge encountered the Process Church in 1970, while he was studying Scientology. Bainbridge had conducted several months of fieldwork with the group during the early 1970s, particularly in its Boston branch. His observation took place largely in 1970–71, when he was an active group member, but became episodic between 1972 and 1974. In his book, he disguised the names of people to preserve their identities. Adam Parfrey noted that Bainbridge provided a "more even-handed view" of the Church than that provided by the likes of Sanders and Terry. Bainbridge's study was later described as "the main source of information" about the group by La Fontaine.

=== Breakdown ===
The relationship between MacLean and De Grimston grew strained; De Grimston had begun a relationship with a younger woman, Morgana, who later became his third wife. They also disagreed on the direction of the Process Church; MacLean believed that they should declare the "Satanic" phase to be over, to be replaced by a "Christian" phase, although De Grimston disagreed. In 1974, the De Grimstons separated. De Grimston took a minority of the group members with him, seeking to continue the Process Church in a manner akin to his original form, although abandoned the project in 1979, when he moved professionally into business.

Most of the Church's members retained their allegiance to MacLean. She renamed the Church as the Foundation Church of the Millennium, which in 1977 became the Foundation Faith of the Millennium, and in 1980 the Foundation Faith of God; followers generally referred to it simply as "The Foundation." The group defined itself as "a Christian church" which required its members to believe in the Trinity, the divinity of Jesus Christ, and his second coming. It also promoted a healing ministry which was influenced by Pentecostalism. Like the Process Church, membership was organised according to a hierarchical system of degrees, and it was led by a nine-member Council of Luminaries. MacLean's principal collaborator in the group was longstanding Church member Timothy Wyllie. In 1977, he founded a group in New York City called the Unit, which he regarded as being part of the Foundation. MacLean disagreed with this move and sued Wyllie, although she lost. The Unit soon disbanded. Wyllie then pursued an independent career in the New Age milieu, with a focus on communicating with extraterrestrials, angels, and dolphins.

In 1982, the Foundation Faith of God moved its base to Utah, where it established an animal rescue refuge in Kanab. In 1993, the organisation changed its name to Best Friends Animal Society; it removed all reference to religious ideas from its statutes. In 2004, a feature article in Rocky Mountain News publicly revealed Best Friends' origins in the Process Church. In 2005, MacLean died, and the management of her charity was left to her second husband, Gabriel De Peyer, a former Foundation Faith of God Church member.

== Beliefs ==
=== Classification ===
Various commentators have described the Process Church as a religion, and it has also been characterised as a new religious movement. There has been some debate as to whether to categorise the Process Church as a form of Satanism or not; the anthropologist Jean La Fontaine noted that it was "difficult to decide whether it was a truly Satanist organization". The Process Church's beliefs have been described as "a kind of neo-Gnostic theology".

=== Belief system ===
In the initial phase of the group's beliefs, Moor and MacLean taught that there was only one supreme divinity, God, and the focus of the group's activities was to transform those aspects of human nature which defied God. Many of the group's therapeutic practices or "processes" (hence the name) and concepts were derived from Scientology, including the term "processing." In these therapy sessions, the group utilised an electronic meter titled the "P-Scope", which was based on the Scientology E-meter.

In 1967, Moor introduced the notion of four divinities to the group's beliefs. The Process Church preached the existence of four gods, who were regarded not as literal entities but as inner realities existing within each human personality. Accordingly, these deities were not worshipped. The names of its deities were drawn from traditional Judeo-Christian religion. They were known as Jehovah, Lucifer, Satan, and Christ, and were collectively referred to as the "Great Gods of the Universe." The Church stated that "Jehovah is strength. Lucifer is light. Satan is separation. Christ is unification."

Each member was instructed to follow the god, or gods, which were best suited to them. Each individual was understood as a combination of two of these gods. The Church taught that an individual's personality and relationships could be explained by reference to which gods he manifested. Moor, for instance, described himself as a blend of Luciferian and Christian traits, while MacLean regarded herself as a combination of Jehovan and Satanic traits. None of the deities was considered evil, but "basic patterns of human reality." Moor taught the real "devil" was humanity or the "Grey Forces", which were understood as representing the compromise and conformity typical of the masses.

As indicated by the group's name, The Process Church of The Final Judgment, the Church taught a form of millennialism. According to Process eschatology, the four separate divinities would be unified in the endtimes. The reconciliation of opposites was seen by Moor in Matthew 5:44, where Christ tells his followers to love their enemies. Moor taught Christ's enemy was Satan, and the "reuniting of the Gods" was achieved through love.

== Activities ==
The communal life of the Church members was strictly regulated. Among group members, sex and the use of drugs and alcohol (with the exception of caffeine and nicotine) were strictly rationed, with these practices being regarded as a distraction from spiritual work. Unlike other Satanic groups active during the same period, the Process Church did not practice magic. The Process Church strongly opposed vivisection.

The Church held public rituals similar to Christian practices, such as baptisms, marriages and a weekly gathering titled the Sabbath Assembly. Baptisms were performed at every elevation of status in the hierarchy of the Church. The Processeans sang solemn hymns to the four deities during the assemblies.

The group used a swastika-like symbol ("the P-Sign") as its insignia. The symbol had four superimposed P letters, and was also seen as representing the trumpets of the four "Great Gods." The group also used a second symbol, "the Sign of the Union", which featured the letter Alpha inside the letter Omega, representing the intercourse of male Lucifer with female Jehovah.

== In culture ==
In 1989 and 1990, several former members of the Church attempted to recreate it in Round Lake, New York. There were also reports of a revival group being based in Yorkshire, England.

In 2009, Adam Parfrey noted that the original Process Church "enjoys cultural influence." American funk group Funkadelic's album "America Eats Its Young" also included a polemic titled "America" which was attributed to The Process Church of the Final Judgement. (The Process Church are also thanked "for their inspiration.) Industrial music group Skinny Puppy released an album titled The Process that contained lyrics espousing anti-vivisection themes. The Process Church's rituals were later adopted and utilised by the band Psychic TV and the group that formed around it, Thee Temple ov Psychick Youth (TOPY). Several TOPY members had previously been involved with the Process Church. American band Sabbath Assembly, formed in 2009, recorded three albums which consisted of reinterpreted Church hymns. Genesis P-Orridge performed guest vocal on one of those records. Alessandro Papa founded the New Processean Order in Italy 2014 by recording the album Hymns to the Great Gods of the Universe with invited friends and guest artists. Integrity founder Dwid Hellion founded The Holy Terror of the Final Judgment label, releasing music by many bands influenced by the Process. Holy Terror and associated artists include Integrity themselves (who released the album Humanity is the Devil based on Process Writ in 1996), Gehenna (band), Rot In Hell, Psywarfare, Ringworm, Sutekh Hexen and others.

Robert de Grimston's writings and the Writ of The Process Church have long outlived the original cult. His 'Brethren Information' (those speeches meant for members of the church at the time) are widely available online. A detailed discussion of the modern Process Church appeared in Disinfo in July 2015. Genesis P-Orridge worked with longstanding church member Timothy Wyllie to produce a book featuring reproductions of the church's magazines and reminiscences of several members. It was published as Love, Sex, Fear, Death: The Inside Story of The Process Church of the Final Judgment by Feral House in 2009.

=== Books ===
- Love Sex Fear Death: The Inside Story of the Process Church of the Final Judgment by Timothy Wyllie - Expanded Edition, Feral House, February 2, 2023
- Propaganda and the Holy Writ of The Process Church of the Final Judgement: Process Sex Issue•Fear Issue•Death Issue by Timothy Wyllie, Feral House, February 2, 2023
- The Process - Archives, Documents, Reflections and Revelations by Alessandro Papa; End of Kali Yuga editions, First Reprint (October 2020)
- Process (Complete Collection, vol 1-2)
- Revival: Resurrecting the Process Church of the Final Judgement by William Sims Bainbridge, Feral House, June 29, 2017
- The Manson File: Myth and Reality of an Outlaw Shaman (Ultimate Edition - UK Edition by Nikolas Schreck, Crossbank Publishing, October 2022). Includes "several more pages in the British edition on British occultists relevant to the case including the Process and others..." - Nikolas Schreck

=== Film ===
- Sympathy for the Devil: The True Story of The Process Church of the Final Judgment, June 7, 2015 (directed by Neil Edwards)
- The Sons of Sam: A Descent Into Darkness, Netflix, 2021 (Directed by Joshua Zeman)
