= William Smith Anderson =

Scottish painter

- Born: 21 November 1878; Kilsyth, Scotland
- Died: 22 August 1929 (aged 50); Hexham, England
- Known for: Landscapes and street scenes in watercolour and oils
- Spouse: Daisy Agnes McGlashan
- Relatives: Violet Meikle McGlashan, sister in law

William Smith Anderson (21 November 1878 - 22 August 1929) was a Scottish painter. He is one of the McGlashan-Anderson artistic dynasty of the Glasgow School of Art.

== Life ==
William Smith Anderson, sometimes known as Jock, was born in Kilsyth on 21 November 1878.

Anderson's father was John Anderson (c. 1850 - 8 November 1918); his mother was Janet Bogle (29 July 1852 - 13 November 1931), known as Jessie. They had married on 28 November 1876 in Coatbridge.

William was the eldest of their 7 children.

Around the age of 10 his family moved to Kirkintilloch. On leaving school at 16 he got a job as in the local iron foundry of Messrs. Cameron and Roberton. He became their commercial traveller. By the age of 18 to 31 he was either staying in the north east of England, or in the Glasgow and Kirkintilloch area.

Anderson married Daisy Agnes McGlashan on 28 September 1909 in Glasgow.

In 1910 they moved to Hexham, where William and Daisy had two daughters: Daisy McGlashan Anderson and Agnes Violet Anderson.

After the First World War he returned to Hexham.

== Art ==
Anderson attended the Glasgow School of Art from 1897 to 1901. He won several Haldane bursaries.

Anderson began exhibiting in the Royal Scottish Academy in 1917 with his The Embankment.

Anderson continued exhibiting with the RSA right up to his death in 1929. In 1921 Primroses; 1922 Interior; 1923 Interior; 1925 La Poupée; 1926 Venetian Glass; 1928 Interior; and 1929 Studio Interior.

After his death the family moved back to Scotland. His last work posthumously exhibited at the RSA was the 1930 Nephitos Roses.

== Death ==
Anderson died in South Rigg, Hexham on 22 August 1929. He left £1442 and 9 shillings to his wife Daisy Agnes McGlashan.

Anderson's grave lies in Hexham Cemetery, Northumberland.

== Works ==
- Interior: Woman At A Bureau, held by the Scottish Borders Council
- Still Life and Lustre, held by the Laing Art Gallery
- La poupée, Landscape with Cottage, and Still Life with a Doll, held by the Glasgow School of Art
