= Annabel Kidston =

British artist (1896–1981)

- Born: Agnes Kidston; 1896; Glasgow, Scotland
- Died: 1981 (aged 84–85); North Berwick, Scotland
- Education: Glasgow School of Art; Académie de la Grande Chaumière
- Known for: Painting, illustration

Annabel Kidston (1896–1981) was a Scottish artist who painted in both oil and watercolours and was also an etcher, engraver and illustrator.

== Biography ==
Agnes Kidston was born in Glasgow and studied at the Glasgow School of Art from 1914 to 1920. She then spent some time in Paris where she trained with André Lhote at the Académie de la Grande Chaumière before returning to Scotland and spending three years as the head of the art department at Laurel Bank School in Glasgow. Kidston left that post in 1926 and enrolled at the Slade School of Fine Art in London where she was taught wood engraving by Thomas Smith. In 1927 Kidston joined the Glasgow Society of Lady Artists and the following year won the Societies' Lauder Award. During World War II Kidston worked for the Committee for the Education for the Forces, running art and painting classes for troops, many from Poland, stationed in St Andrews during the conflict. Living in St Andrews, Kidston became a member of a group of artists, that included Józef Sękalski, Alison McKenzie and Winifred McKenzie, that sought to promote wood engraving and became known as the St Andrews School. Kidston went on to hold a number of posts in the group and also spent some time between 1947 and 1950 as a part-time lecturer at the Dundee College of Art.

During her career Kidston illustrated a number of books including 1927 editions of Matthew Arnold's The Forsaken Merman and The Scholar Gipsy. She was a regular exhibitor with the Royal Glasgow Institute of the Fine Arts and also with both the Royal Scottish Academy and, on at least one occasion, the Royal Academy in London. Both her sisters, Helen and Margaret, were also artists and after living in St Andrews, Kidston died at North Berwick in East Lothian.
