= Thomas Symington Halliday =

Scottish artist and teacher (1902-1998)

- Born: 11 April 1902; Thornhill, Dumfries and Galloway
- Died: 22 May 1998 (aged 96); Ashford, Kent
- Education: Glasgow School of Art
- Known for: Sculpture, Painting, Stained Glass

Thomas Symington Halliday MBE FRSA (11 April 1902 – 22 May 1998) was a Scottish artist and teacher. Although Halliday was an accomplished sculptor, painter and teacher, he is also known for his designs for stained glass windows.

== Biography ==
Halliday was born in Thornhill near Dumfries. His father was a grain merchant and he grew up on a farm. After attending Ayr Academy, Halliday spent some years working as a marine engineer on the River Clyde in Glasgow before he enrolled at the Glasgow School of Art. Helped by the artist Norman Forrest, Halliday began his career as a sculptor in 1932 and would, in due course, produce figures of animals and birds in wood, bronze and terracotta.

Halliday worked as the Art Master at Prestwick High School for several years and also taught at Ayr Academy. In 1941 he was appointed principal of the art department at the High School of Dundee, a post he retained until he retired in 1965. During World War Two, Halliday painted ship building and naval camouflage operations on the Clyde. Two of these paintings were subsequently purchased by the War Artists' Advisory Committee and are now held by the Imperial War Museum in London. Later he was commissioned to paint a large mural of the Battle of Narvik for the Royal Naval Dockyard at Rosyth. In 1947 he co-edited, with the poet George Bruce, the magazine Scottish Sculpture.

For many years, Halliday lived at Wormit at Newport-on-Tay. There he carved the war memorial for the parish church and designed a coat of arms for the Town Council. Newport-on-Tay Town Council also commissioned him to produce a carving of a stag, which they presented to the Queen in 1958. He designed numerous stained glass windows including several for parish churches in and around Ayr and Dundee. He was a founding member of the Guild of Aviation Artists, was a member of the Royal Society of Marine Artists and was elected to Society of Scottish Artists in 1943. In 1963 he exhibited works with the New Scottish Group. Halliday was also a regular exhibitor with both the Royal Scottish Academy and the Royal Glasgow Institute of the Fine Arts. He was awarded an MBE in 1963.
