= Daisy Agnes McGlashan =

Scottish writer and illustrator

- Born: Daisy Agnes McGlashan; 5 June 1879; Dunoon, Scotland
- Died: 17 August 1968 (aged 89); Alexandria, Scotland
- Known for: Painting, Illustration
- Spouse: William Smith Anderson
- Relatives: Violet Meikle McGlashan, sister

Daisy Agnes McGlashan (5 June 1879 – 17 August 1968, Vale of Leven Hospital in Alexandria) was a Scottish writer and illustrator. She also designed clothes.

== Life ==
Daisy Agnes McGlashan was born in Dunoon. Her father, John McGlashan (c. 1844 – 16 June 1920), manufactured underclothing. Her mother was Agnes Meikle (c. 1848 – 9 January 1929). They married on 13 June 1870 in Cathcart, Glasgow.

McGlashan had an elder sister, Violet Meikle McGlashan (3 December 1872 – 18 December 1905).

=== Personal life ===
McGlashan married William Smith Anderson (21 November 1878 – 22 August 1929) on 28 September 1909. They had two daughters: Daisy McGlashan Anderson (1910 – 1996), and Agnes Violet Neish (née Anderson) (1911 – 2008).

== Art ==
McGlashan studied at the Glasgow School of Art from 1898 to 1905. After her marriage and the birth of her children, she largely stopped painting, but continued to write stories. Her illustrated children's stories were published in the Glasgow Herald, the Newcastle Chronicle, and the Hexham Courant.

She took up painting, encouraged by Henry Y. Alison. She joined the Glasgow Society of Lady Artists in 1957.

In her 60s, McGlashan began to paint again, specialising in flower studies in pastels.

== Works ==
One of her dresses, created around 1900, is in the Glasgow School of Art archives.
