= Anne Knox Arthur =

Scottish artist and author

- Born: 17 August 1866; Govan, Scotland
- Died: 6 November 1949 (aged 83); Glasgow, Scotland
- Known for: Embroidery
- Awards: Lauder Prize, 1939

Anne Knox Arthur (17 August 1866 - 6 November 1949) was a Scottish artist and author, specialising in embroidery. She became Head of the Embroidery Department of the Glasgow School of Art in 1928. She won the Lauder Prize in 1939.

== Life ==
Anne Knox Arthur, known as Annie, was born at Harmony House in Govan in 1866. In 1891 she was a Kindergarten teacher, staying at 7 Finlayson Place (the street is now called Clouston Street) in the North Kelvinside / Maryhill area. She was to follow her elder sister Emily to art school in Glasgow.

Annie's father was Robert Arthur (16 January 1830 - 6 March 1888), a draughtsman, engraver, printer and lithographer, a son of Robert Arthur and Ann Urie. In 1861 he is in 7 Finlayson Place with his young family, and his sisters and his brother in law Evelyne Mirton. Evelyne was then 14 and his occupation was an engraver.

Annie's mother was Emily Morley (born c. 1839 in England), sometimes known as Emily Mirton. Emily and Robert married on 2 March 1855 and had a large family. Annie's brothers were:- Robert Arthur (born c. 1857); James Arthur (born c. 1859), he married a Janet Lyburn (born 6 August 1860) on 10 September 1880; and John Arthur (born 23 December 1873). Annie's sisters were:- Louie Arthur (c. 1871 - 10 July 1955), she married a David Dehane Napier; Edith Mary Arthur (born c. 1877); and Emily Arthur (born c. 1862), who became an art student before Annie.

Annie later stayed at 15 Rose Street, Glasgow, where she set up a studio.

== Art ==
She went to the Glasgow School of Art from 1908 and graduated there around 1912.

She became a teacher there from 1912 to 1931. She taught embroidery, china painting and decorative leatherwork. In 1928 she succeeded Ann Macbeth as head of the embroidery department.

She left the Art School in 1931, when she set up the Arthur Studios at her home in 15 Rose Street, Glasgow.

In the Glasgow Society of Lady Artists exhibition of October–November 1939, Arthur won the Lauder Prize for her needlework of a curtain patterned in blue and red.

== Death ==
She died of lung cancer at her home in 15 Rose Street on 6 November 1949 in Glasgow, at the age of 83 in the city centre.

== Works ==
She wrote a book on embroidery in 1920 and it was published again in 1931.

She also wrote for the Blackie's Girls Annual of 1925 and subsequent editions in which she explained raffia work.
