= Eagle Scout Peak =

Mountain peak in California, United States

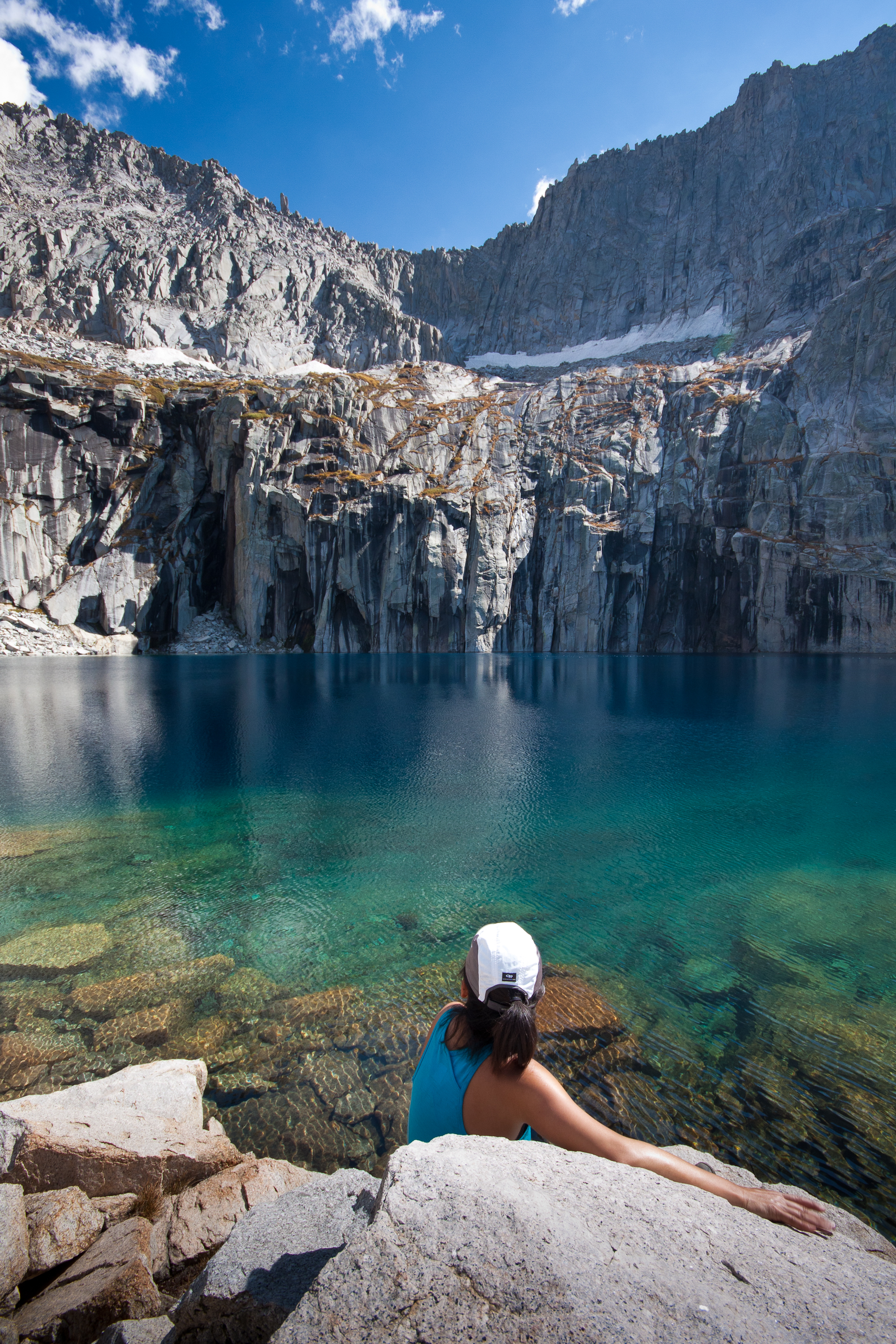
- The steep cliffs of Eagle Scout Peak's north face rising above Precipice Lake

Highest point
- Elevation: 12,005 ft (3,659 m); NAVD88
- Prominence: 365 ft (111 m)
- Parent peak: Peak 12180
- Isolation: 0.67 mi (1.08 km) to Peak 12180
- Listing: Sierra Peaks Section
- Coordinates: 36°32′45″N 118°33′43″W

Geography
- Location within California
- Parent range: Great Western Divide

Climbing
- First ascent: July 15, 1926 by Francis Farquhar and Eagle Scouts Frederick Armstrong, Eugene Howell, and Coe Swift
- Easiest route: YDS Class 2

Eagle Scout Peak is a 12,005-foot (3,659 m) mountain on the Great Western Divide of the southern Sierra Nevada. The mountain is located in the backcountry of Sequoia National Park. The mountain sits immediately to the south of Kaweah Gap along the main crest of the Great Western Divide. The east face of Eagle Scout Peak is relatively gentle and offers the easiest routes to the summit. The north face drops 1,600 feet (490 m) to Precipice Lake in a series of sheer cliffs. This scene was the backdrop for the Ansel Adams photo "Frozen Lake and Cliffs".

On July 15, 1926 Francis Farquhar and three Eagle Scouts (Frederick Armstrong, Eugene Howell, and Coe Swift) made the first recorded ascent of Eagle Scout Peak, hence its name.

== Background ==
The main route to the summit is a YDS Class 2 scramble up the east face from the Big Arroyo. Two technical climbing routes exist on the steep north face: "Dancing Deer Direct" and "North Face". Both these routes have YDS Class 5.7 difficulty.

Eagle Scout Peak does not have particularly high topographic prominence due to a high-elevation ridge connecting it to several higher peaks to the south. However, the sheer vertical drop on the north face makes the mountain visually prominent. Its position along the ridge of the Great Western Divide endows the mountain with panoramic views in all directions. Eagle Scout Peak is featured on the peak list maintained by the Sierra Peaks Section.

== Gallery ==
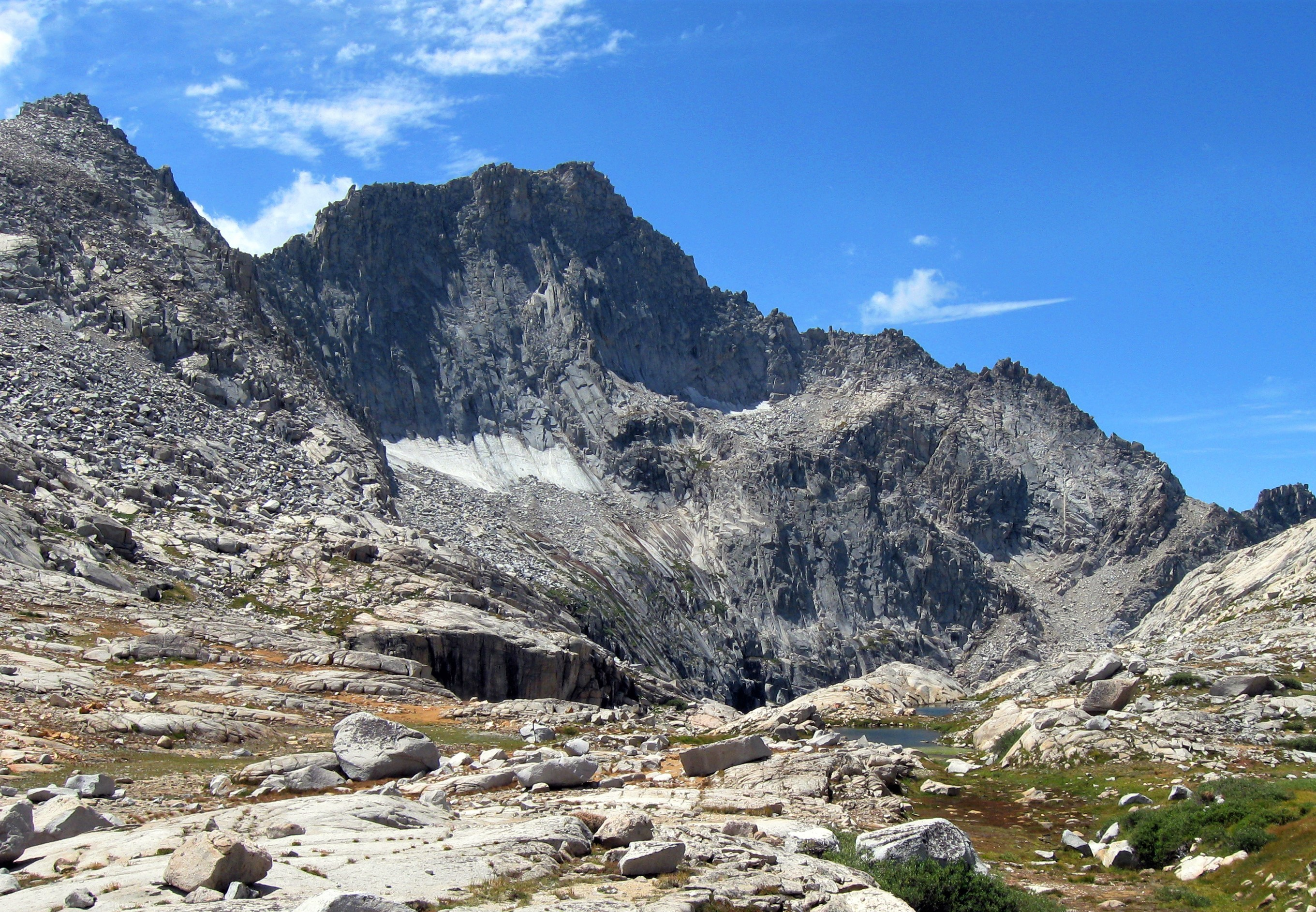
Eagle Scout Peak, north aspect

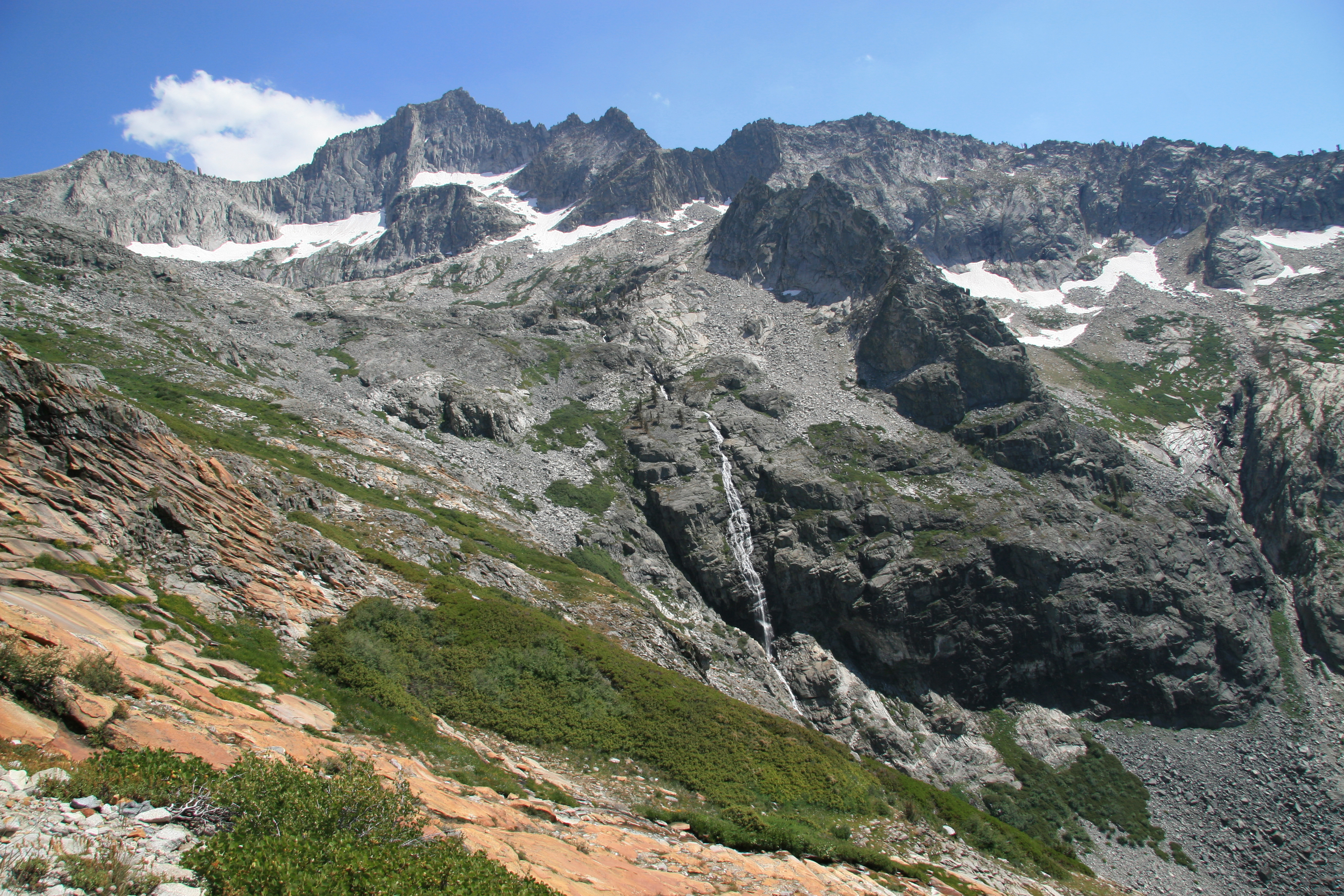
Eagle Scout Peak in upper left
