= Philip Raskin =

Scottish artist

Philip Raskin (born 1947 in Glasgow) is a Scottish artist who has achieved notability within the contemporary Scottish art scene. He specialises in painting landscapes and seascapes. His works have been the subject of many exhibitions and have been sold throughout the world. He is the father of TV presenter and antiques expert Natasha Raskin.

== Early life and career ==
Raskin was born in Glasgow in 1947 and studied at the Glasgow School of Art in the 1960s, but did not complete his course due to his father's sudden death. He was a restaurant proprietor for twenty years before becoming a full-time artist. His work and limited editions are on sale in galleries throughout the UK and the world.

His notability in the contemporary Scottish art scene has been recognised in several periodicals and publications. His works are widely available as posters. In July 2026 he was elected as President of the Glasgow Art Club.

His daughter, the TV presenter and antiques expert Natasha Raskin, was born in 1986. It was through the auctioneers McTear's selling his work that Natasha commenced work with them, leading to her television career in various antiques and auction shows. Father and daughter received media coverage in 2015 when the auctioneer sold his work.

== Exhibitions ==
- Eduardo Alessandro Studios, "A Scottish Symphony - Philip Raskin", 1–22 November 2014.
- Galleria Luti, "Vibrant Colours - Mixed Summer Exhibition", 2016.
- Art @ 37, "Spring Exhibition", 2016.
- Strathearn Gallery, Crieff, "Sheila Fowler and Philip Raskin, Texture and Light" 28 May - 26 June 2016.
- Eduardo Alessandro Studios, "Philip Raskin Exhibition", 5–27 November 2016.
- Annan Gallery, Glasgow, "Island Escapes", 13 March - 16 April 2018.
- Annan Gallery, Glasgow, 23 February - 24 March 2019.
- Strathearn Gallery, Crieff, 27 April - 26 May 2019.
- Strathearn Gallery, Crieff, 24 April - 23 May 2021.
- Annan Gallery, Glasgow, 26 May - 30 June 2022.
- Strathearn Gallery, "Feature Exhibition", Crieff, 8 June - 7 July.
