= Laura Loudon =

Scottish painter (1871–1945)

- Born: Laura Jane Bennie; 13 March 1871; Glasgow, Scotland
- Died: 22 May 1945 (aged 74); Moulin, Scotland
- Known for: Painting
- Awards: Lauder Prize, 1939

Laura Loudon (née Bennie; 13 March 1871 - 22 May 1945) was a Scottish painter. She won the Lauder Prize in 1939.

== Personal life ==
Laura Jane Bennie was born in 1871 in Tradeston, Glasgow, into the family of James Bennie (c.1834–1884), a manager of an iron foundry, and Margaret Muir Smith (18 October 1837–4 November 1905), who got married on 6 October 1957 in Tradeston. Laura was one of their nine children.

Laura married John Loudon (born c. 1870) in 1897 in Bridge of Weir, Renfrewshire. John was also an artist, and he became an Art Master in Hamilton Academy; and later became a Chief Inspector for Art in Scotland. They had two children. Their daughter was Noni McCrone (8 August 1902 - 7 November 1991), also an artist. Their son John Alexander Loudon was born around 1904.

== Art ==
Lara Loudon studied at the Glasgow School of Art from 1888 to 1897.

From 1918 almost until her death, she stayed in various houses around Ayr. From 15 Wellington Street in Ayr, she exhibited her first piece in the Royal Scottish Academy exhibition. This was Master Jack MacLaurin. In 1920 she exhibited two pieces at the RSA: Mrs. R. D. Fergusson and Sarah, Daughter Of James A. Morris Esq.

In 1925 she was at 9 Cassilis Street in Ayr. She exhibited a Still Life at the RSA.

In 1927 she was at Moorlands, Bellevale in Ayr and she exhibited Noni at the RSA which was a portrait of her daughter.

In 1930 and 1931 she was back at 9 Cassilis Street in Ayr. In 1930 she exhibited The White Shawl at the RSA; and in 1931 she exhibited Flowers That Bloom In The Spring.

In 1938 she was back at Moorlands, Bellevale in Ayr. She exhibited her last pieces with the RSA in that year: another Still Life and Scotch Firs.

In 1939 she won the Lauder Prize with a still life in the Glasgow Society of Lady Artists exhibition. She also exhibited a landscape in the same exhibition East Wind. The Glasgow Herald observing that Louden had changed her style of painting.

== Death ==
She died on 22 May 1945 in Moulin near Pitlochry.

== Works ==
In addition to the works listed above, her A Still Life of a Profusion of Red Flowers in Vases, and Still Life With Flowers are known.

Her Portrait Of A Blonde Little Girl, and A Wooded Hillside are also known.
