= Christine Berrie =

Scottish illustrator and artist

- Born: Glasgow, Scotland, United Kingdom
- Education: Glasgow School of Art; Royal College of Art
- Known for: Illustration
- Movement: Industrial
- Patrons: Angus Hyland
- Website: http://www.christineberrie.com

Christine Berrie is a Scottish illustrator and artist based in Glasgow. She is known for her industrial-themed illustrations, including such objects as wall plates, gas meters, dials, buttons and switches, control boxes, electrical objects, machinery, and appliances.

Berrie, who has been active since 2003, received her Bachelor of Arts degree in visual communication from Glasgow School of Art, and her Master of Arts degree from the Royal College of Art in London. She began developing an interest in industrial designs as a child when her father, a draughtsman, brought technical drawings home from work. These drawings, by her own account, fascinated her. After graduating from RCA in 2002, Angus Hyland of Pentagram Design Studio attended her degree show, purchased one of her books, and invited her to contribute to Hand to Eye: Contemporary Illustration, a book he published in 2003. Hyland then organised a display of her work at Pentagram's London offices; the show consisted of drawings Berrie created of common office objects and implements found throughout the Pentagram office itself.

Her illustrations have been featured in a number of publications including The Guardian, The Big Issue, German magazine Forum, New Scientist, Nature, The New York Times, Creative Review, Design Week, Esquire, Computer Arts, Digital Arts, and Vogue, among others. One of her illustrations, a drawing of an "emergency stop" button, appeared on the cover of New Scientist. Her exhibitions have appeared at DesignersBlock and AOI Images UK tour.
