= High Sierra Trail =

Long-distance hiking trail in the United States

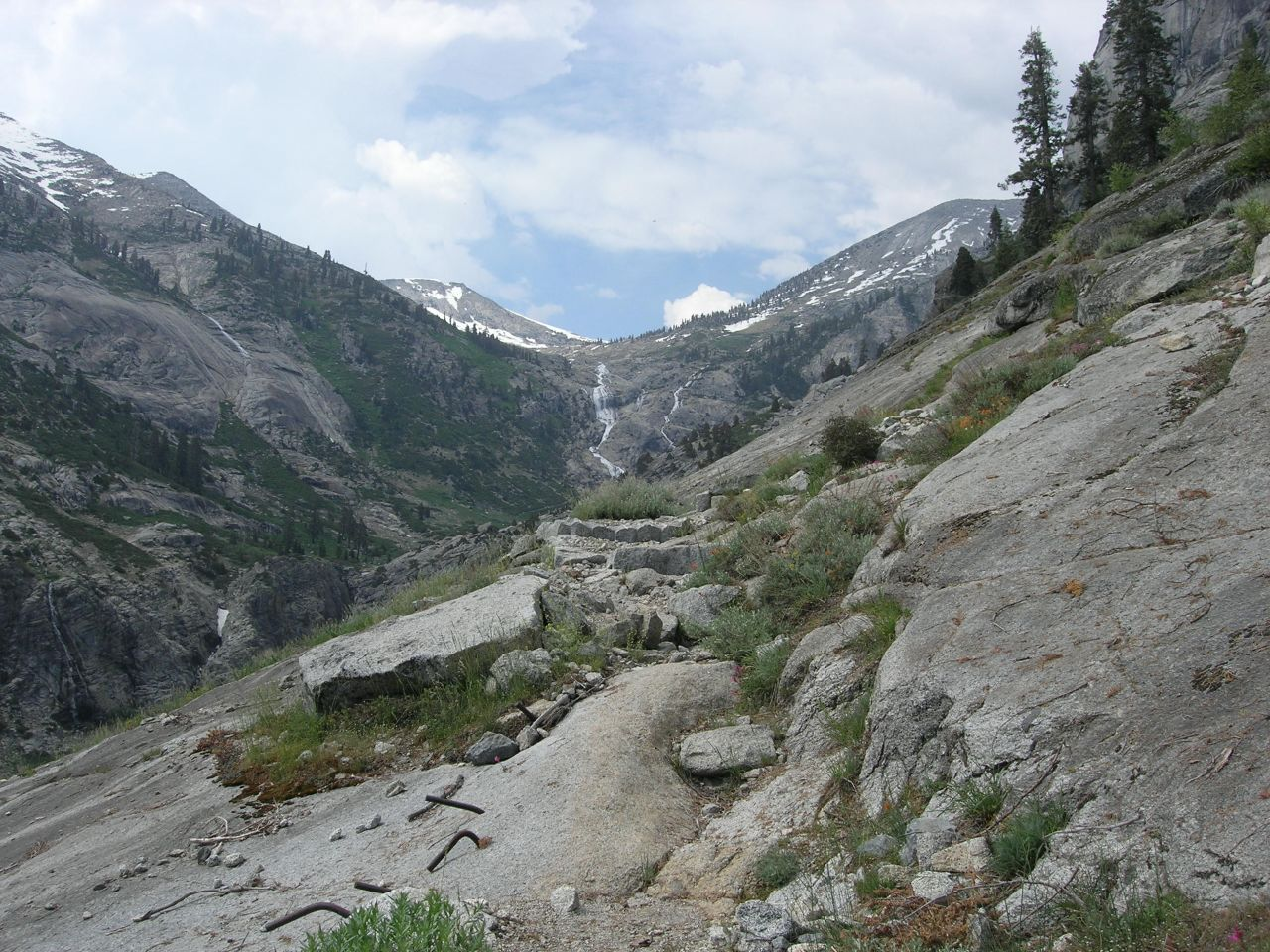
- Trail near Hamilton Lake, 2006
- Length: 49 miles (79 km)
- Location: Sequoia National Park, Tulare County, California, USA
- Trailheads: Crescent Meadow,36°33′17″N 118°44′57″W; John Muir Trail,36°35′40″N 118°22′16″W
- Use: Hiking
- Highest point: 10,700 feet (3,300 m)
- Lowest point: 6,700 feet (2,000 m)

The High Sierra Trail (HST) is a hiking trail in Sequoia National Park, California. The trail crosses the Sierra Nevada from west to east. According to the Yosemite Decimal System, the HST is a Class 1/Class 2 trail, which means simple scrambling, with the possibility of occasional use of the hands for balance.

== Route ==
From the plateau of the Giant Forest at Crescent Meadow (elevation 6,700 ft or 2,000 m) the trail travels high on the northern wall of the canyon of the Middle Fork of the Kaweah River to Bearpaw Meadow. This first 11.4 miles (18.3 km) of the trail is a popular though strenuous two-day round trip hike. The Bearpaw Meadow High Sierra Camp (a simple tent hotel) located here dates back to 1934.

Leaving the meadow, the trail climbs through the Hamilton Lakes Basin to Kaweah Gap which, at 10,700 feet (3,300 m), is one of the lowest passes over the Great Western Divide within the park. From this pass, the route descends into Big Arroyo and then climbs to the Chagoopa Plateau, only to drop again to 6,700 feet (2,000 m) in the Kern River Canyon. After following along the Kern River, it turns east and climbs parallel to Wallace Creek to the junction with the John Muir Trail and Pacific Crest Trail 48.9 miles (78.7 km) from Crescent Meadow. This is the end of the High Sierra Trail. Hikers may continue on the John Muir Trail 12.6 miles (20.3 km) to the summit of Mount Whitney.

The Mount Whitney Trail branches to the east from the John Muir Trail 2.4 miles (3.9 km) south of Mount Whitney's summit, and descends to Whitney Portal located at the end of the road from Lone Pine, California. From Crescent Meadow to Whitney Portal, the trail is 72.2 miles (116.2 km) long and often takes 6 days or more for the average hiker to complete. The fastest claimed time to traverse is 15 hours 26 minutes, by Joseph Roldan.

Work began on the High Sierra Trail in 1928, and it was the first Sierra trail built solely for recreational use.

Hikers should check with park rangers before planning a trip with riding or pack stock. At least one section of the trail is closed to stock, and grazing is limited in many areas.

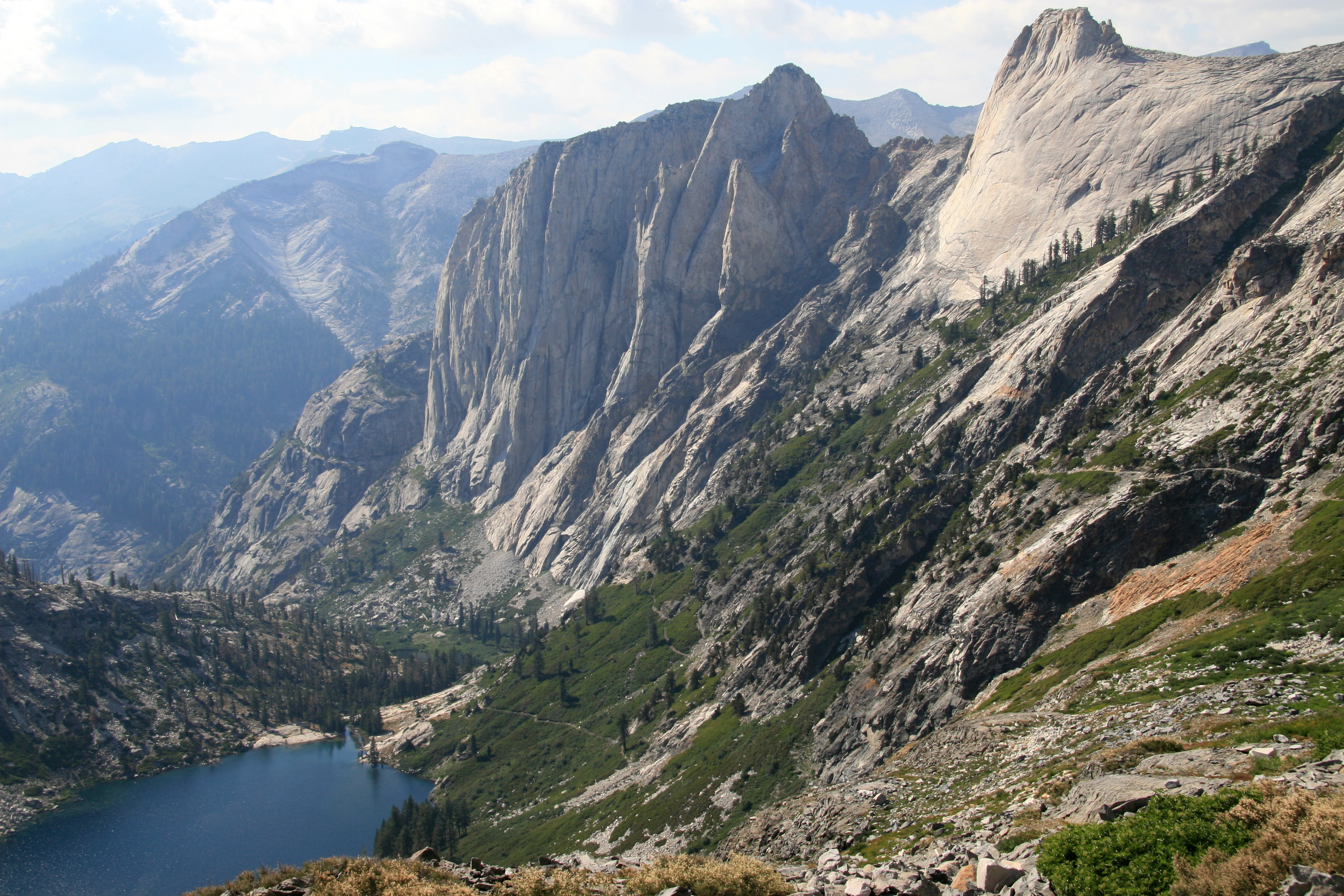
The High Sierra Trail has switchbacks above Hamilton Lake. It passes over the Great Western Divide at Kaweah Gap, climbing some 3,000 feet (900 m) in 4 miles (6.4 km).

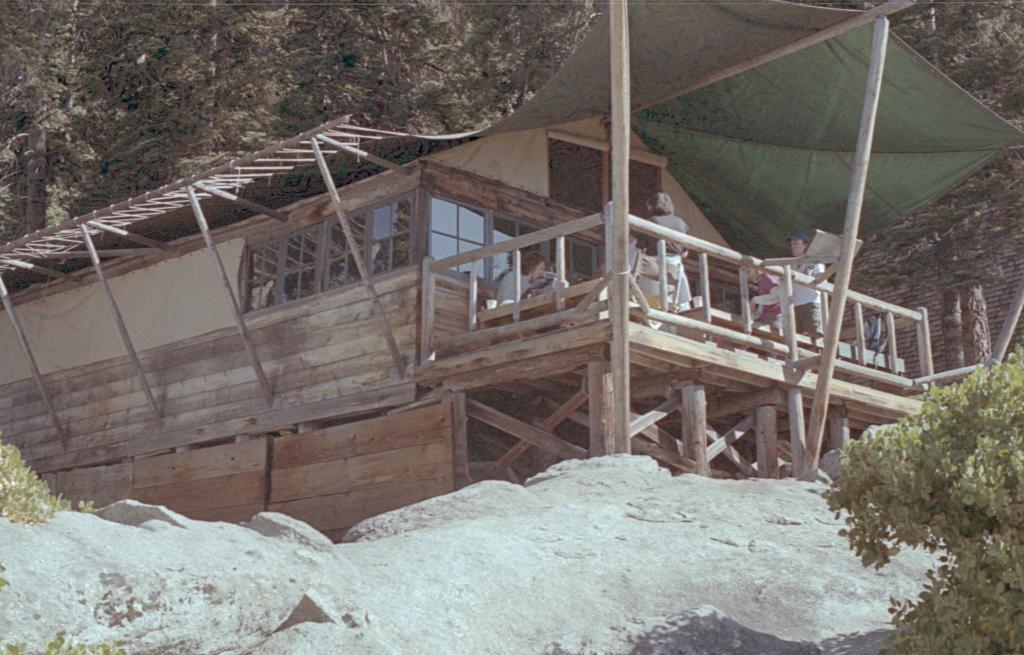
Bearpaw High Sierra Camp Main Tent 36°33′54″N 118°37′15″W
