= Kaweah Gap =

Mountain pass in California, United States

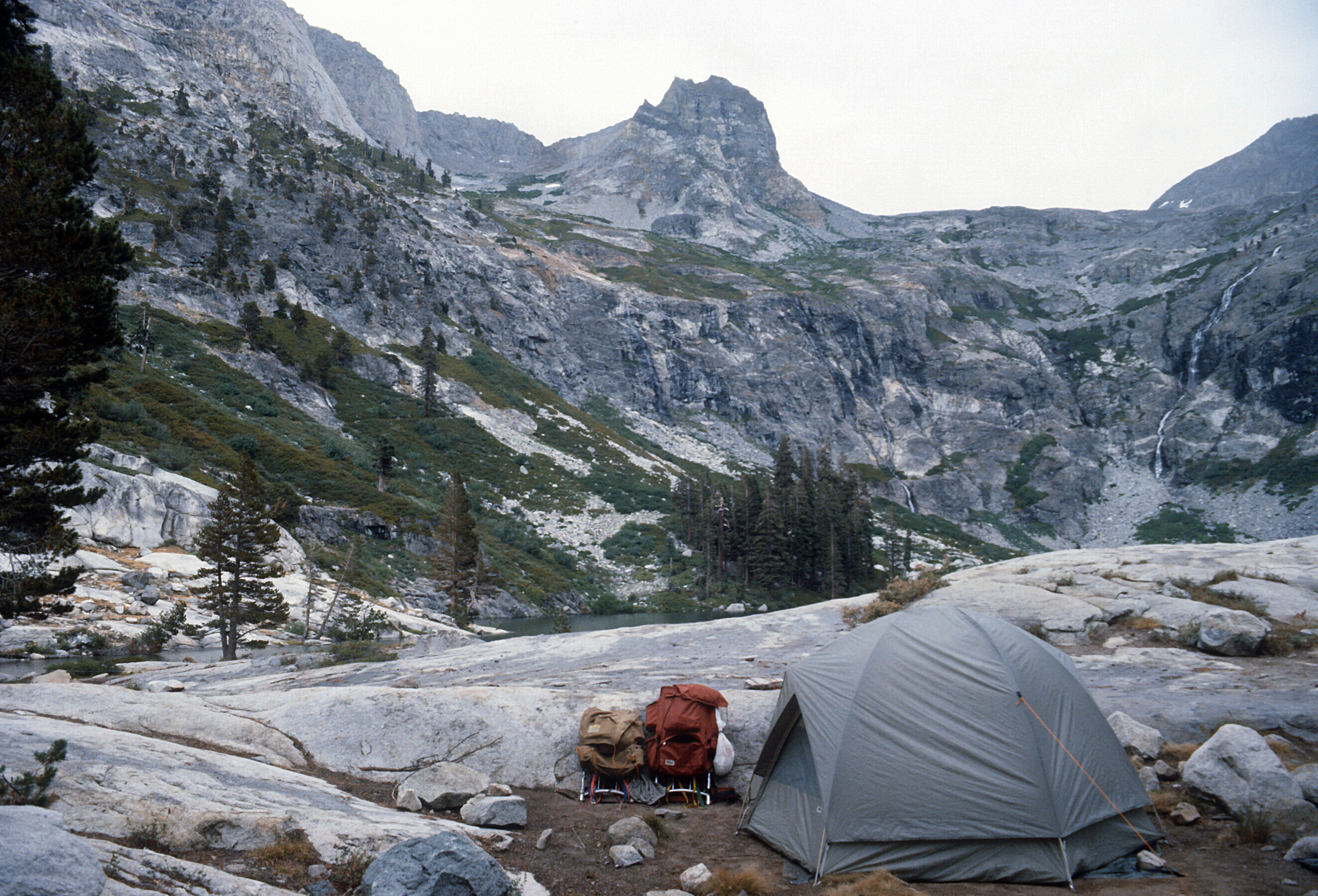
- The view looking east to Kaweah Gap, with a hiker's camp in the foreground, 1986
- Interactive map of Kaweah Gap
- Elevation: 10,689 feet (3,258 m)
- Traversed by: High Sierra Trail

Third Approach
- Location: Tulare County, California, US
- Range: Great Western Divide, Sierra Nevada
- Coordinates: 36°33′23″N 118°33′04″W
- Topo map: USGS Triple Divide Peak

The Kaweah Gap (/kəˈwiːə/) is the lowest east–west pass through the Great Western Divide, in Sequoia National Park, California, United States. The High Sierra Trail is routed through this pass.

The Kaweah Gap is flanked by Mount Stewart to the north and Eagle Scout Peak to the south.
