= 2007 Turner Prize =

British prize for contemporary art

The 2007 Turner Prize for modern British art was awarded on 3 December 2007. It was the 22nd Turner Prize competition. There were four nominees for the 2007 prize and the winner was Mark Wallinger.

The nominees in alphabetical order were:

- Zarina Bhimji, born in Uganda, 1963.
- Nathan Coley, born in Glasgow, 1967.
- Mike Nelson, born in Loughborough, 1967. This was Nelson's second nomination. He lost out to Martin Creed in 2001.
- Mark Wallinger, born in Chigwell, 1959. This was Wallinger's second nomination. He lost out to Damien Hirst in 1995.

== Turner Prize exhibition 2007 ==
The exhibition took place in Liverpool in advance of its time as European Capital of Culture. It opened on 19 October 2007 and closed 13 January 2008.

The Turner Prize is awarded for a show by the artist in the previous year. When nominees are told of their nomination they then prepare exhibits for the Turner Prize exhibition, often at short notice. As such, the Turner Prize exhibition may not feature the works for which the artist was initially nominated by the judges. However the Turner Prize exhibition tends to be the basis on which public and press judge the artist's worthiness for nomination.

=== Works, artist's statements and press coverage ===
==== Zarina Bhimji ====
Bhimji's exhibited works were chiefly photographs of Uganda from which she was expelled:

- Waiting
  - Video footage shot in a sisal factory with the material fluttering in the wind.
- Illegal Sleep
  - A photograph of guns leaning against a wall.
- Your Sadness Is Drunk
  - A photograph of some chickens outside a dilapidated building (see Guardian slideshow 2 below in external links).
- This Unhinged Her
  - A photograph of some unmounted candelabras lying in an outbuilding (see Guardian slideshow 2 below in external links).
- No Border Crossing
  - A photograph of bundles of papers (see Guardian slideshow 2 below in external links).
- Shadows and Disturbances
  - A photograph of closed double doors in a dilapidated building.
- Echo
  - A photograph of graffiti on a wall
- Breathless Love
  - A photograph of some distant structures on the horizon of a barren landscape
- Ambivalence
  - A photograph of the turquoise interior of a dilapidated building.

The artist said:

- "[my work attempts to] speak the unspeakable that wants to be spoken".

The critics said:

- "My point is not that Bhimji’s work is shoddy, but that it is unoriginal." – The Times
- "while her video work [...] has a lyrical beauty, the rather misty poeticism probably needs rather a lot of background explanation before it gets any profound message across." – The Times
- "quiet observational detail that requires a different kind of exposure than can be had in the Turner prize." – The Guardian
- "large colour photographs of faded and decrepit interiors present us with a kind of African Pompeii: a melancholy world empty of people, yet filled with their presence; dead, but unburied; ruined, yet lovely." – The Times
- "full of atmosphere and formal beauty, but she has done this kind of thing before (in Uganda) and I see little development in this new body of work." – The Telegraph
- "sensitive, a little bit atmospheric, a little bit disquieting, but without any particular character [...] The photos are what any arty photographer doing "images of colonial legacy" would come up with." – The Independent

==== Nathan Coley ====
Exhibited works included:

- Camouflage Church
- Camouflage Mosque
- Untitled (Threshold Sculpture)
  - Blocks of wood that visitors to his part of the exhibition had to step over.
- There Will Be No Miracles Here
  - A sign written in lights saying the above.
- Hope and Glory
  - A model house with "Hope" written on one wall and "Glory" on the other.
- Annihilated Confession
  - Three pictures of confessional boxes sprayed over with black paint so as to hide the images.

The critics said:

- "[There Will Be No Miracles Here] is the best thing in Coley's show, which is otherwise crass." – The Guardian
- "harsh, theoretical and dull." – The Times
- "a miserable display [...] Coley's show was at best a misjudged aberration." – The Guardian
- "If the Turner Prize were given on the basis of best-in-show, this year I'd give it to Coley hands down." – The Telegraph
- "He may well be the most boring artist in Britain. His work is so dull to look at that you swiftly turn to a print-out in search of an explanation – and find the work is wholly explained by its explanation but not made the slightest bit more interesting." – The Independent

==== Mike Nelson ====
Pieces exhibited included:

- Double coop displacement
  - Artwork made of wood and chicken wire.
- Amnesiac Shrine, or The Misplacement (a Futurological Fable): Mirrored Cubes – Inverted – With the Reflection of an Inner Psyche as Represented by a Metaphorical Landscape
  - A shrine to bikers ("The Amnesiacs"), veterans of the first Gulf War. First one walks past a fake bonfire made of cut up traffic cones and wood. Then there are four cubes with openings in them. When one looks inside there is a vista of tiny lights.

The artist said:

- "The Amnesiacs started off as a way of coping with all the heavy theoretical stuff that I had absorbed in the Eighties. I basically created this narrative structure for myself: the fictional bikers who made the work. I had to apply the mentality of the Amnesiacs to the making of the work. Then a good friend died suddenly, and in my grief I turned them into something else, this gang of amnesiac bikers who build shrines through flashbacks."

The critics said:

- "will probably win this year" – The Times
- "[Amnesiac Shrine] is one of the best things Nelson has ever done, but my guess is that it won't win the Turner." – The Telegraph
- "an artist with a real and rich imagination" – The Independent

==== Mark Wallinger (winner) ====
Exhibited works included:

- Sleeper
  - A two-hour film of Wallinger dressed in a bear suit wandering around the Neue Nationalgalerie in Berlin at night.

Not exhibited but regarded as the major contribution to his Turner nomination and win:

- State Britain
  - A recreation of Brian Haw's demonstration encampment in Parliament Square against the Iraq War. The piece had resonance when displayed in London's Tate Britain as it was placed just outside the protest exclusion zone surrounding parliament. Since this would have been lost by showing at Tate Liverpool the piece was not used.

The artist said: He has said that the bear in Sleeper symbolises Berlin, the title Sleeper refers to Cold War spies, and that he was inspired by a film of a fairy tale about a prince turned into a bear he saw as a child.

The critics said:

- "boring and unworthy." – The Times
- "should be the winner" – The Times
- "Bungle wins the £25,000 Turner" – The Sun
- "I can't think of a better winner, nor of works more deserving of a wide audience." – The Guardian
- [referring to Sleeper] "Good artists sometimes make bad art, and that's the case here." – The Telegraph
- "[Sleeper is] a transfixing piece of silent theatre" – The Independent
