= Amelia Beattie Forsyth =

Scottish painter (1913–1993)

- Born: 16 October 1913; Glasgow, Scotland
- Died: 5 November 1993 (aged 80); Dumfries, Scotland
- Known for: Painting, Embroidery
- Awards: Lauder Prize, 1937
- Elected: Glasgow Society of Lady Artists, 1936

Amelia Beattie Forsyth (16 October 1913 – 5 November 1993) was a Scottish painter. She won the Lauder Prize in 1937.

== Life ==
Amelia Beattie Forsyth was born on 16 October 1913 in Pollokshields, Glasgow.

Her mother was Georgina Dick; her father Stuart Symington Forsyth. They married in 1902 in Kinning Park, Glasgow. Amelia had an older sister Martha Fleming Forsyth, born in 1910.

Before the Second World War the sisters travelled to the United States but returned to Glasgow in 1939. Their home address was then 90 Springkell Avenue in Bellahouston, Glasgow. Amelia is an artist, Martha is a teacher. The address was their parent's home.

Amelia married William Fleming Johnson in Pollok, Glasgow at Titwood Church on 25 May 1945. William Fleming Johnson was the son of Mr. and Mrs. John H. Johnston of 7 Gardenside Avenue, Uddingston.

The couple moved to stay at Woodside Cottage in Kirkbean.

== Art ==
She went to the Glasgow School of Art. She had her diploma awarded with distinction in 1935, singling out her work for mural decoration.

She was elected to the Glasgow Society of Lady Artists in November 1936.

She exhibited The Red Hat with the Glasgow Society of Lady Artists in 1938. Later that year she exhibited embroidery.

In 1939 with the Glasgow Society of Lady Artists, she exhibited Kinnord From Dinnet.

In the Royal Scottish Academy exhibition of 1939 she presented The Woman Who Does.

In 1940 the Glasgow Society of Lady Artists were selling their work in aid of the City of Glasgow Central War Relief Fund. Forsyth's work was included in this.

== Death ==
She died on 5 November 1993 at the Alexandra unit of the Dumfries Infirmary. The service was at Kirkbean Church on 10 November 1993. She is buried in Kirkbean Cemetery in Dumfries and Galloway. She is buried alongside her husband William Fleming Johnson, who died on 23 September 2003 aged 97.
