= Mary Ann MacLean =

Scottish occultist

Mary Ann MacLean (20 November 1931 – 14 November 2005) was a Scottish occultist who was co-founder of the Process Church of the Final Judgement.

== Early life ==
MacLean, who was born in Glasgow, Scotland, grew up under poor conditions with a single mother who often left her daughter with relatives.

== Career ==
In the early 1960s, MacLean moved to the United States where she lived an immersive life with the boxer Sugar Ray Robinson. After one year, she returned to the UK and London, working as a call girl after getting involved in a prostitution-ring scandal, and then joining the Church of Scientology. Among Scientologists, she met Robert Moor, later renamed by MacLean as Robert de Grimston. They married in 1964, created their version of Scientology auditing called Compulsions Analysis. The next year they introduced the cult, The Process Church of The Final Judgment, to a small group of friends and like-minded people. De Grimston named himself "The Teacher" and MacLean "The Oracle" in the cult that slowly grew in numbers. MacLean took care of the ideology as well as the strategy, while de Grimston's face became the trademark of the business activity.

In 1974, MacLean overpowered her husband by excluding him from his own church. Robert de Grimston disappeared into the United States while Mary Ann MacLean tried to further develop a cult organisation, relocating the group to Arizona and renaming it The Foundation - Church of the Millennium. The church group relocated in 1984, with animals they had at their Arizona ranch, to property it purchased in Kanab. Then, in 1991, The Process Church of The Final Judgment was dissolved and the church renamed Best Friends Animal Society, on the group's Kanab, Utah, property. MacLean continued to engage, with a low profile, in spiritual and political life in Utah. In 2005, MacLean died, and the management of her charity was left to her second husband, Gabriel De Peyer, a former Foundation Faith of God Church member and co-founder of Best Friends Animal Society.
