= Jessie M. McGeehan =

Scottish artist (1872–1950)

- Born: 1872; Rawyards, Airdrie
- Died: 1950 (aged 77–78); Glasgow
- Education: Glasgow School of Art

Jessie Mary McGeehan (1872–1950) was a Scottish artist renowned for her painting and mosaic work, often depicting genre scenes, landscapes and figures.

== Biography ==
McGeehan was born in Airdrie and her father Patrick was a carriage hirer. An artistic family, Patrick exhibited a painting Royal Scottish Academy in 1879 and the artist Aniza McGeehan (1874–1962) was Jessie's younger sister. Both sisters studied at the Glasgow School of Art, Jessie being enrolled at the age of 15 in 1888 and last recorded as attending in 1895. Their younger sister Mary Catherine (1877–1960), later known as Sister Callista, also attended Glasgow School of Art from the age of nine.

Jessie McGeehan also studied in Paris after leaving the Glasgow School of Art.

== Artwork ==
McGeehan's work included paintings, pastels, stained glass, mosaics and tapestry designs. She was active from 1892 and exhibited at the Royal Scottish Academy from 1895 with the work Sweet Idleness until 1916.

From 1897 McGeehan lived and had a studio at 134 Bath Street, Glasgow, which was shared with Aniza until 1899. By 1936 she had moved to 152A Renfrew Street as advertised in the 'Glasgow Observer'.

In 1901 McGeehan exhibited the work The Victorian Era at the Royal Academy in London.

McGeehan's 1929 oil portrait of her sister Aniza is in the North Lanarkshire Museums collections. This was one of two oil paintings exhibited in the 1929 Walker Art Gallery Autumn Exhibition.

Jessie McGeehan created a glass mosaic panel for St Augustine’s Church in Langloan, Coatbridge. She also created a glass mosaic in fourteen panels depicting the Stations of the Cross for St Aloysius Church in Garnethill as well as undertaking work for St Mary's Church in Lancashire.

While at Glasgow School of Art, Jessie associated with prominent Scottish artists including Margaret Macdonald and Frances MacDonald of the Glasgow Four.

McGeehan's artworks regularly come up for sale at auction.
