= Jean D. Burns =

Scottish artist

- Born: Jean Douglas Burns; 15 June 1903; Cumbernauld, North Lanarkshire, Scotland
- Died: 30 September 1992 (aged 89); Melrose, Scottish Border, Scotland
- Resting place: Earlston Cemetery, Earlston, Scotland
- Education: Glasgow School of Art

Jean Douglas Burns (15 June 1903 – 30 September 1992) was a Scottish artist whose work focused on woodcuts and engraving.

== Early life and education ==
Jean D. Burns was born in North Lanarkshire, Scotland. She was the eldest child of Captain Alan Burns and Helen Jaqueline Burns (née Hope) of Cumbernauld House. Burns attended the Glasgow School of Art where she studied Drawing and Painting and Black and White Section (Lithograph and Printing Processes) between 1920 and 1929. She was awarded a Diploma in Drawing and Painting in 1927.

In 1923 her mother died, after which, she took up the role of mother to her younger brothers and lady of the house for her father.

== Work and career ==
Burns exhibited on five occasions at the Royal Scottish Academy in 1926, 1927, 1929, 1930 and 1942. She exhibited at the Royal Glasgow Institute of the Fine Arts in 1930 and 1932 as well as the Society of Women Artists in 1930, 1935 and 1938.

She illustrated Harriet G. Hog's book "Supposing that lots of things were true. A book of rhymes." published by Gowans and Gray (London and Glasgow) in 1929. Examples of Burns' work is in the permanent collection of the National Galleries of Scotland.

== Later life ==
In 1947 Burns moved to Cowdenknowes farm and ran a riding school with her younger brother Charles. In 1958 she became joint Master of the Lauderdale Hunt alongside Mrs. J.L. Hogarth and retained this position for two years. After 1960 she lived at Cowdenknowes House and farmed for the rest of her life until retirement.

Burns died on 30 September 1992 in the Borders Hospital, Melrose.
