= Mary Maclean =

Mary Maclean MA, RCA
- Mary Maclean
- Born: Mary Christina Maclean; 25 July 1962
- Died: 12 February 2018 (aged 55)
- Education: Glasgow School of Art; Rijksakademie Amsterdam; Royal College of Art
- Occupation: Artist
- Website: marymaclean.org.uk

Mary Christina Maclean, MA, RCA (25 July 1962 – 12 February 2018) was an artist, photographer, and Royal Academy lecturer.

== Early life ==
Maclean was born in Edinburgh, and attended the local Edinburgh Steiner School, participating in exchange programmes in other European countries. She attended the Glasgow School of Art, the Rijksakademie in Amsterdam, and London's Royal College of Art.

== Career ==
Initially Maclean trained as a painter, but turned to photography. She exhibited at the Royal Academy and other venues such as Jerwood Space in the London, as well as shows in Germany and Switzerland. She has exhibited as a solo artist, and in collaboration with other artists, including Outside Architecture with Tim Renshaw and Bernice Donszelmann. She held senior lecturer posts at Coventry University, the University of Reading, and the Royal Academy Schools.

For over 25 years, Maclean also worked as a visiting lecturer in fine art and photography at a number of UK universities, as well as an external examiner.

Maclean was married to fellow artist Phil Griffin, and died, aged 55, on 12 February 2018.

== Awards and fellowships ==
- Fellowship in Painting, Winchester School of Art
- British School at Rome, Abbey Award
- International Artist Residency Program, Cite Internationale des Arts, Paris
- Dutch Government Scholarship, Rijksakademie Amsterdam, Resident 1985-86
