= Elizabeth McDonald =

American painter

- Education: Glasgow School of Art
- Known for: contemporary visual art
- Awards: Young Artist Award, BP Portrait Competition, National Portrait Gallery, London; 2010
- Website: www.elizabethmcdonald.com

Elizabeth McDonald is an American painter.

McDonald lives in Glasgow, Scotland. She received an M.F.A. from the Glasgow School of Art. McDonald won the Young Artist Award at the 2010 BP Portrait Awards in the National Portrait Gallery, London. Her work was exhibited at the 500x Gallery Dallas, Texas in 2010, and at the Chalet Invitational Glasgow the same year. In addition, McDonald was shown at the John Moores Contemporary Painting Exhibition in 2010.
