= Bearpaw Meadow High Sierra Camp =

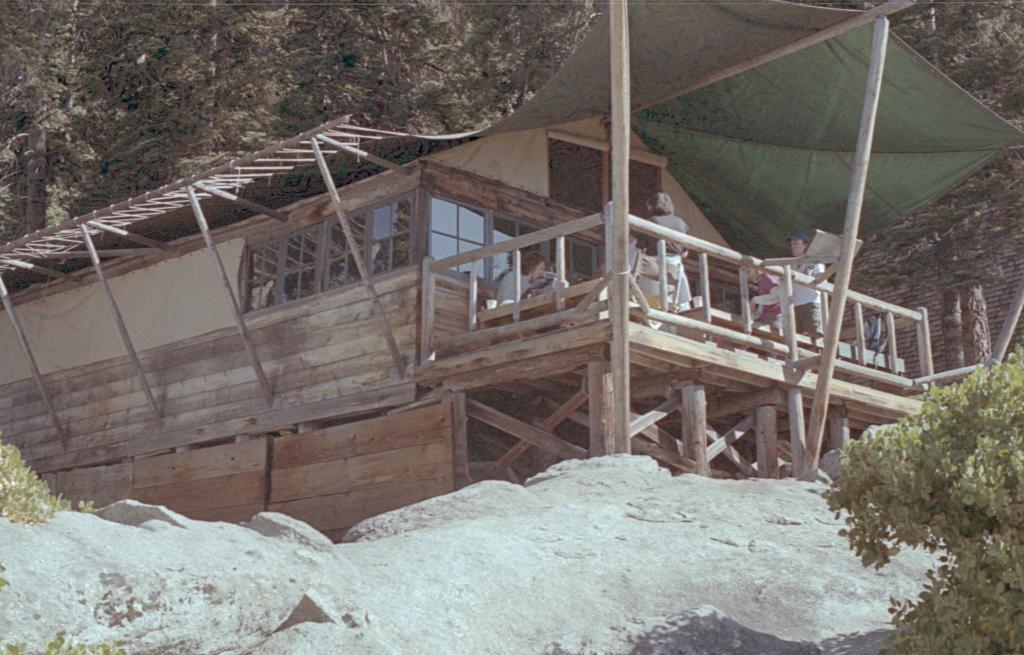
- Bearpaw Meadow High Sierra Camp Main Building

- Location within California
- Location: High Sierra Trail
- Coordinates: 36°33′55″N 118°37′17″W
- Season: mid-June to mid-September
- Bearpaw Meadow High Sierra Camp
- U.S. National Register of Historic Places
- NRHP reference No.: 16000192
- Added to NRHP: April 21, 2016

Bearpaw Meadow High Sierra Camp is a full-service tent campground in Sequoia National Park. It was established in 1934. The camp was listed on the National Register of Historic Places in 2016.

Weather permitting, it is open mid June to mid September. It is about 12 miles east of Giant Forest on the High Sierra Trail.

== See also ==
- National Register of Historic Places listings in Tulare County, California
