= Martin Boyce =

Scottish sculptor

Martin Boyce (born 1967) is a Scottish sculptor inspired by early 20th century modernism.

Boyce was born in Hamilton, South Lanarkshire and educated at Holy Cross High School in Hamilton. He studied at the Glasgow School of Art, graduating with a BA in environmental art in 1990, then a MFA in 1997. He lives in Glasgow with his wife and children.

Boyce won the 2011 Turner Prize for his installation Do Words Have Voices, displayed at the Baltic Centre for Contemporary Art in Gateshead. The installation is a recreation of a park in autumn.

== Books ==
- Martin Boyce: When Now is Night, Princeton Architectural Press, 2015 (ISBN 978-1616894030)
