= Evelyn Carslaw =

British artist (1881–1968)

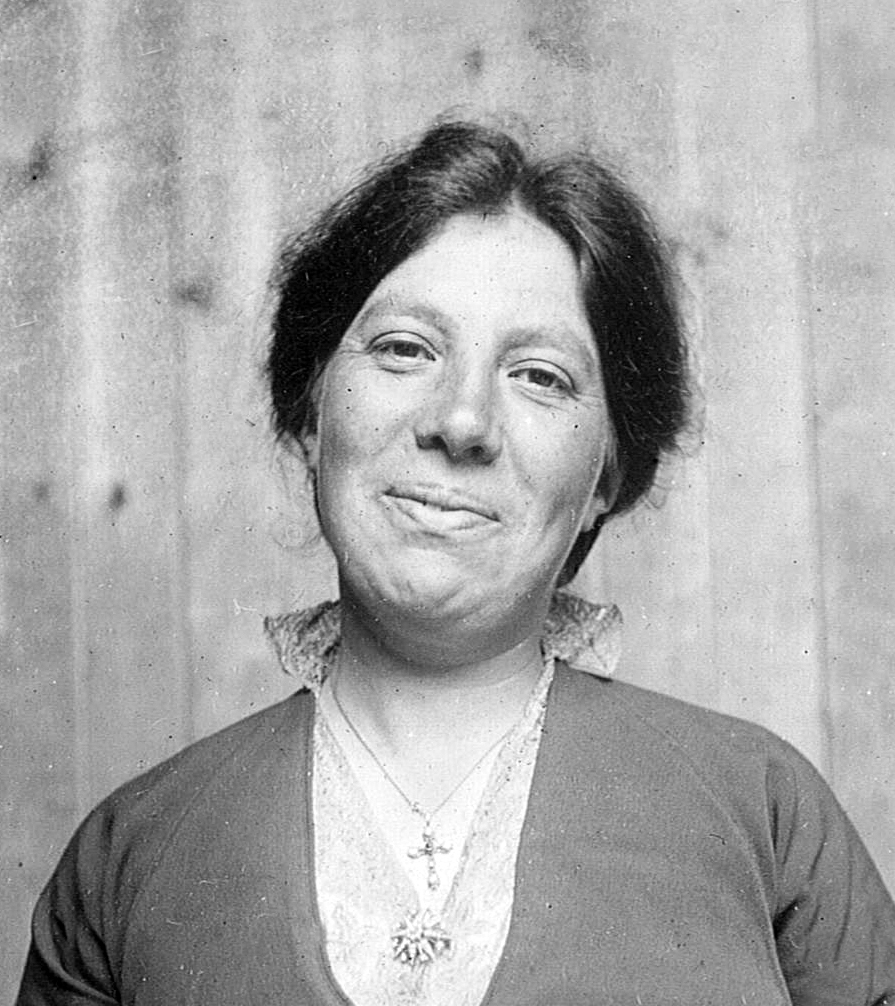
- Born: Evelyn Jane Lochhead Workman; 8 March 1881; Glasgow, Scotland
- Died: 19 September 1968 (aged 87); Helensburgh
- Education: Glasgow School of Art
- Known for: Landscape painting, book illustrations

Evelyn Carslaw née Evelyn Jane Lochhead Workman (8 March 1881 – 19 September 1968) was a Scottish landscape painter and illustrator.

== Biography ==
Carslaw was born in Glasgow and attended the Glasgow School of Art from 1897 to 1907. She then studied in Paris and travelled extensively, painting landscapes in Spain, Italy and the Netherlands, working in both oils and watercolours. In 1905 she married a surgeon, Dr RB Carslaw, and together they had five children. The family lived at Rhu on Gare Loch in Argyll and Bute and were keen sailors. In 1944 Dr Carslaw published Leaves from Rowan's Logs, an account of a yacht cruise around the west coast of Scotland, which contained numerous illustrations by Evelyn Carslaw. Later in life she lived at Helensburgh and became friends with Norah Neilson Gray. Carslaw was a member of the Glasgow Society of Lady Artists from 1905 and also exhibited several paintings with the Royal Glasgow Institute of the Fine Arts.
