= Alison McKenzie =

British artist

- Born: 30 August 1907; Bombay, British Raj (now India)
- Died: August 5, 1982 (aged 74); St Andrews, Scotland
- Education: Glasgow School of Art; Grosvenor School of Modern Art
- Known for: Painting and printmaking

Alison McKenzie (30 August 1907 – 5 August 1982) was a British artist who was both a painter and printmaker.

== Biography ==
McKenzie was born in Bombay to Scottish parents and was educated in England at the Prior's Field School from 1921 to 1925. She studied at the Glasgow School of Art for four years, during which time she won the Fra Newbery medal, before moving to London in 1929 to learn wood engraving at the Grosvenor School of Modern Art under Iain Macnab. McKenzie undertook several commercial commissions, including producing poster designs for the London and North Eastern Railway. In 1937 McKenzie illustrated an edition of John Milton's On the Morning of Christ's Nativity for the Gregynog Press. McKenzie's sister, Winifred, was also an artist and during World War II they moved to St Andrews in Scotland. At St Andrews, along with Annabel Kidston, they organised drawing and engraving classes for the Allied troops, many from Poland, stationed there.

After World War II, McKenzie joined the staff of the Dundee College of Art on a part-time basis to teach life drawing and to help her sister establish the college's printmaking department. She retired from the college in 1958 to care for her elderly mother but continued to paint and exhibit. She painted in oil and gouache and produced many prints, often in a Cubist style with a palette of greys, ochre and black. McKenzie regularly exhibited with the Royal Scottish Academy, the Scottish Society of Women Artists and with the Royal Scottish Watercolour Society. The Scottish National Gallery of Modern Art and other Scottish galleries hold examples of her prints and paintings. The two sisters held a number of joint exhibitions including one at the Cork Street Gallery in London and another at the English Speaking Union in Edinburgh.
