= List of Scottish women artists =

This is a list of women artists who were born in or are closely associated with Scotland.

== A ==
- Janet Macdonald Aitken (1873–1941), painter
- Ann Dunlop Alexander (1896–1969), painter, illustrator
- Lena Alexander (1899–1983), painter
- Jessie Algie (1859–1927), flower painter
- Mary Parsons Reid Allan (1917–2002), painter
- Marion Ancrum (fl. 1885–1919), painter
- Anne Anderson (1874–1952), illustrator
- Louise Gibson Annand (1915–2012), painter, filmmaker
- Hazel Armour (1894–1985), sculptor, medallist
- Mary Nicol Neill Armour (1902–2000), painter
- Annie R. Merrylees Arnold (fl. 1890s–1930s), miniature painter
- Susan Ashworth (fl. 1860–1880), painter
- Joan Ayling (1907–1993), miniature painter

== B ==
- Isabel Brodie Babianska (1920–2006), painter, costume designer, set designer, illustrator
- Barbara Balmer (1929–2017), painter
- Elizabeth Balneaves (1911–2006), painter, writer, filmmaker
- Violet Banks (1896–1985), painter
- Claire Barclay (born 1968), installation artist, printmaker, sculptor
- Wilhelmina Barns-Graham (1912–2004), abstract painter
- Mardi Barrie (1930–2004), painter
- Johanna Basford (born 1983), illustrator
- Penelope Beaton (1886–1963), painter
- Katherine Arthur Behenna (1860–1924), U.S.-based portrait artist
- Christine Berrie, illustrator
- Anne Bevan (born 1965), visual artist, sculptor
- Helen Biggar (1909–1953), sculptor
- Ann Spence Black (1861–1947), painter
- Karla Black (born 1972), sculptor
- Elizabeth Blackadder (1931–2021), painter, printmaker
- Jemima Blackburn (1823–1909), painter, illustrator
- Elizabeth Blackwell (1707–1758), botanical illustrator
- Yvonne Boag (born 1954), painter
- Phyllis Bone (1894–1972), sculptor
- Christine Borland (born 1965), medical-themed contemporary artist
- Mary Bright (1956–2002), Scottish curtain designer
- Julie Brook (born 1961), sculptor, painter, installation artist
- Helen Paxton Brown (1876–1956), painter, embroiderer
- Margaret Oliver Brown (1912–1990), painter, illustrator
- Elizabeth York Brunton (1880–c.1960), painter, printmaker
- Mary Rose Hill Burton (1857–1900), painter
- Nancy Jane Burton (1891–1972), painter

== C ==
- Joyce W. Cairns (born 1947), painter
- Katharine Cameron (1874–1965), landscape painter
- Mary Cameron (1865–1921), painter
- Liza Campbell (born 1959), engraver, calligrapher, writer
- Evelyn Carslaw (1881–1968), landscape painter
- Gayle Chong Kwan (born 1973), photographer, installation artist, video artist
- Margery Clinton (1931–2005), ceramist, glass artist
- Gertrude Mary Coventry (1886–1964), portrait painter
- Jean Hunter Cowan (1882–1967), sculptor, painter
- Victoria Crowe (born 1945), painter

== D ==
- Claire Dalby (born 1944), painter, illustrator
- Anne Davidson (1937–2008), sculptor
- Majel Davidson (1885–1969), potter, painter
- Mary C. Davidson (1865–1951), painter
- Mabel Dawson (1887–1965), painter
- Stansmore Dean Stevenson (1866–1944), painter
- Helen Denerley (born 1956), sculptor
- Marion Deuchars (born 1964), illustrator, writer
- de Courcy Lewthwaite Dewar (1878–1959), enamelist, metalworker
- Jessie Alexandra Dick (1896–1976), painter, teacher
- Isobelle Ann Dods-Withers (1876–1939), painter
- Jacqueline Donachie (born 1969), photographer, sculptor, installation artist
- Kaye Donachie (born 1970), painter
- Kate Downie (born 1958), American-born painter, printmaker
- Lady Sophia Dunbar (1814-1909), watercolour painter
- Jean Duncan (1933–2018), painter, printmaker

== E ==
- Joan Eardley (1921–1963), painter
- Marjorie Evans (c.1850–1907), painter

== F ==
- Christian Jane Fergusson (1876–1957), painter
- Margaret Cross Primrose Findlay (1902–1968), sculptor and modeller
- Anne Finlay (1898–1963), painter
- Beth Fisher (born 1944), American-born print artist based in Scotland
- Anne Forbes (1745–1834), portrait painter
- Nikki Forrest (born 1964), Canadian-based illustrator, installation artist, sound artist
- Rose Frain, painter, sculptor, installation artist
- Hannah Frank (1908–2008), sculptor
- Jo Fraser (born 1986), painter
- Annie French (1873–1965), painter, engraver, illustrator, designer

== G ==
- Floris Gillespie (1882–1967), painter
- Janetta Gillespie (1876–1956), painter
- Margaret Gillies (1803–1887), painter
- Henrietta Gilmour (1852–1926), Canadian-born photographer
- Constance Gordon-Cumming (1837–1924), painter, writer
- Mary Grant (1831–1908), sculptor
- Norah Neilson Gray (1882–1931), painter

== H ==
- Maggie Hamilton (1867–1952), painter
- Gwen Hardie (born 1962), painter
- Claire Harrigan (born 1964), painter
- Josephine Haswell Miller (1890–1975), painter
- Mairi Hedderwick (born 1939), illustrator, writer
- Ann Henderson (1921–1976), sculptor
- Mary Balfour Herbert (1817–1893), watercolour painter
- Amelia Robertson Hill (1821–1904), sculptor
- Margaret Ross Hislop (1894–1972), oil painter
- Gwynneth Holt (1909–1995), sculptor
- Louise Hopkins (born 1965), English-born painter, printmaker
- Anna Hotchkis (1885–1984), painter, writer
- Beatrice Huntington (1889–1998), painter, sculptor, musician
- Moira Huntly (born 1932), painter

== I ==
- Esther Inglis (1571–1624), painter, calligrapher, embroiderer, writer

== J ==
- Dorothy Johnstone (1892–1980), painter

== K ==
- Violet McNeish Kay (1914–1971), landscape painter
- Jeka Kemp (1876–1966), painter
- Jessie Keppie (1868–1951), watercolour painter
- Annabel Kidston (1896–1981), etcher, painter
- Anna King (born 1984), landscape painter
- Jessie M. King (1875–1949), illustrator, jewellery designer, fashion designer
- Lady Caroline Kininmonth (1907–1978), painter
- Kathryn Kynoch (1941-2025), portrait painter

== L ==
- Annie Rose Laing (1869–1946), painter
- Elspeth Lamb (born 1951), printmaker
- Eileen Lawrence (born 1946), painter, printmaker
- Bet Low (1924–2007), painter

== M ==
- Ann Macbeth (1875–1948), English-born embroiderer
- Frances MacDonald (1873–1921), painter, embroiderer, illustrator, textile artist
- Shona Macdonald (born 1969), contemporary artist
- Margaret Macdonald Mackintosh (1865–1933), painter, designer
- Esther Blaikie MacKinnon (1885–1934), painter, engraver
- Chica Macnab (1889–1980), painter, engraver
- Bessie MacNicol (1869–1904), painter
- Jessie M. McGeehan (1872–1950), painter
- Alison McKenzie (1907–1982), painter, printmaker
- Lucy McKenzie (born 1977), painter
- Abigail McLellan (1969–2009), painter
- Mary McMurtrie (1902–2003), botanical artist
- Caroline McNairn (1955–2010), painter
- Margaret Mellis (1914–2009), Chinese-born painter
- Grace Wilson Melvin (c.1882–1977), artist, teacher
- Catriona Millar (born 1956), painter
- Agnes Miller Parker (1895–1980), engraver, illustrator
- Lady Marianne Isobel Moncrieff (1875–1961), glass designer
- Victoria Morton (born 1971), painter, sculptor
- Sheila Mullen (born 1942), painter

== N ==
- Mary Nimmo Moran (1822–1899), U.S.-based landscape artist, engraver
- Anne Nasmyth (1798–1874), Scottish landscape artist
- Barbara Nasmyth (1790–1870), Scottish landscape artist
- Charlotte Nasmyth (1804–1884), Scottish landscape artist
- Jane Nasmyth (1788–1867), Scottish landscape artist
- Jessie Newbery (1864–1948), embroiderer, textile artist

== O ==
- Elizabeth Ogilvie (born 1946), sculptor, environmental artist

== P ==
- Aileen Paterson (1934–2018), illustrator, writer
- Emily Murray Paterson (1855–1934), painter
- Katie Paterson (born 1981), mixed media artist
- Viola Paterson (1899–1981), painter and woodcut printer
- Deborah Phillips (born 1965), painter
- Susan Philipsz (born 1965), sound artist, installation artist
- Mary E. Pollitt (1873–1962), painter
- Ivy Gardner Proudfoot (1894–1975), sculptor
- Mabel Pryde (1871–1918), painter
- Della Purves (1945–2008), botanical artist

== R ==
- Barbara Rae (born 1943), painter, printmaker
- Arabella Rankin (1871–c.1935), printmaker
- Catherine Read (1723–1778), portrait painter
- Anne Redpath (1895–1965), painter
- Christina Robertson (1796–1854), Russian court painter

== S ==
- Concordia Scott (1924–2014), sculptor, nun
- Elaine Shemilt (born 1954), printmaker, video artist, photographer
- Lucy Skaer (born 1975), sculptor, painter, filmmaker
- Dorothy Carleton Smyth (1880–1933), painter, stained glass artist, costume designer
- Pamela So (1947–2010), multimedia artist, photographer
- Helen Stevenson (fl. 1920–1935), printmaker
- Grace Campbell Stewart (died 1863), miniature painter
- Maud Sulter (1960–2008), photographer, writer
- Jean Sutherland (1907–2006), photographer, songwriter, poet

== T ==
- Helen Monro Turner (1901–1977), woodcut and stained glass artist

== W ==
- Ethel Walker (1861–1951), painter
- Ottilie Maclaren Wallace (1875–1947), sculptor
- Cecile Walton (1891–1956), painter, illustrator, sculptor
- Alison Watt (born 1965), painter
- Margaret Bruce Wells (1909–1998), printmaker
- Mary Georgina Wade Wilson (1856–1939), painter
- Sylvia Wishart (1936–2008), landscape artist

== Y ==
- Jane Younger (1863–1955), painter

== Z ==
- Anna Zinkeisen (1901–1976), painter
- Doris Zinkeisen (1898–1991), painter
