= List of painters by name beginning with "A" =

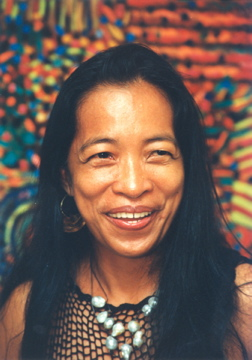
Pacita Abad

Please add names of notable painters with a Wikipedia page, in precise English alphabetical order, using U.S. spelling conventions. Country and regional names refer to where painters worked for long periods, not to nationalities or family background.

- Herbert Aach (1923–1985), American painter and writer
- Hans von Aachen (1552–1615), German mannerist painter
- Pacita Abad (1946–2004), Philippines multi-media artist and painter
- Vilmos Aba-Novák (1894–1941), Hungarian painter and graphic artist
- Riza Abbasi (1565–1635), Persian miniaturist, painter and calligrapher
- Niccolò dell' Abbate (ca. 1510–1571), Italian painter
- Giuseppe Abbati (1836–1868), Italian artist
- Salomon van Abbé (1883–1955), English artist, etcher and illustrator
- Louise Abbéma (1853–1927), French painter, sculptor and designer
- Edwin Austin Abbey (1852–1911), American artist, illustrator and painter
- Mary Abbott (1921–2019), American abstract expressionist painter
- Zeinab Abd al-Hamid (1919–2002), Egyptian oil painter
- Basuki Abdullah (1915–1993), Southeast Asian realist painter
- Rowena Meeks Abdy (1887–1945), American modernist landscape artist
- Josef Abel (1768–1818), Austrian historical painter and etcher
- Evelyn Abelson (1886–1967), English artist
- Gertrude Abercrombie (1909–1977), American artist
- John Brown Abercromby (1843–1929), Scottish painter
- Johann Ludwig Aberli (1723–1786), Swiss painter and etcher
- Anna Maria Barbara Abesch (1706–1773), Swiss reverse glass painter
- Nikolaj Abraham Abildgaard (1743–1809), Danish artist, antiquarian and draftsman
- Béla Apáti Abkarovics (1888–1957) Hungarian painter and graphic artist
- Béla Nagy Abodi (1918–2012), Hungarian painter and graphic artist
- Ruth Abrahams (1931–2000), English artist
- Herbert Abrams (1921–2003), American portraitist
- Ruth Abrams (1912–1986), American painter
- Philip Absolon (born 1960), English Stuckist artist
- Otto Abt (1903–1982), Swiss surrealist painter
- Ismail Acar (born 1971), Turkish painter
- Bernard Accama (1697–1756), Dutch historical and portrait painter
- Andreas Achenbach (1815–1910), German landscape painter
- Oswald Achenbach (1827–1905), German landscape painter
- Patrick Adam (1852–1929), Scottish painter
- Elinor Proby Adams (1885–1945), English painter and illustrator
- J. Ottis Adams (1851–1927), American impressionist
- John Clayton Adams (1840–1906), English landscape artist
- Pat Adams (born 1928), American painter and print-maker
- Robert Adamson (1821–1848), Scottish photographer and chemist
- Sarah Gough Adamson (1883–1963), Scottish landscape painter
- Mary Adshead (1906–1983), English painter and muralist
- Jankel Adler (1895–1949), Polish/English painter and print-maker
- Mór Adler (1826–1902), Hungarian painter
- Willem van Aelst (1627–1683), Dutch still-life painter
- Pieter Aertsen (1508–1575), Dutch historical painter
- Nadir Afonso (1920–2013), Portuguese painter
- Yaacov Agam (1928-2026), Israeli sculptor and experimental artist
- Jacques-Laurent Agasse (1767–1848), Swiss animal and landscape painter
- Knud Agger (1895–1973), Danish painter
- Gyula Aggházy (1850–1919), Hungarian painter and teacher
- Lubna Agha (1949–2012), South Asian artist
- Christoph Ludwig Agricola (1667–1719), German landscape painter
- Ai Xuan (艾軒, born 1945), Chinese painter
- John Macdonald Aiken (1880–1961), Scottish painter
- Ai-Mitsu (靉光, 1907–1946), Japanese surrealist
- Edgar Ainsworth (1905–1975), English painter and illustrator
- Ivan Aivazovsky (1817–1900), Russian painter
- Tadeusz Ajdukiewicz (1852–1916), Polish portrait painter
- Ras Akyem, Barbadian painter
- Francesco Albani (1578–1660), Italian painter
- Josef Albers (1888–1976), German/American artist, mathematician and educator
- Mariotto Albertinelli (1474–1515), Italian painter
- Giocondo Albertolli (1743–1839), Swiss/Italian architect, painter and sculptor
- Ivan Albright (1897–1983), American artist
- Kazimierz Alchimowicz (1840–1916), Lithuanian/Polish painter
- Tivadar Alconiere (1797–1865) Austro-Hungarian painter
- L. Alcopley (1910–1992), American artist
- Eileen Aldridge (1916–1990), English painter and restorer
- Pierre Alechinsky (born 1927), Belgian artist
- George Aleef (1887–1970), Russian historical painter
- Fyodor Alekseyev (1753–1824), Russian landscape painter
- Mikoláš Aleš (1852–1913), Czech painter
- Cosmo Alexander (c. 1724 – 1772), Scottish/American painter
- John Alexander (died 1733), Scottish painter and engraver
- Larry D. Alexander (born 1953), American realist artist, teacher and author
- Lena Alexander (1899–1983), Scottish painter
- Else Alfelt (1910–1974), Danish painter
- Brian Alfred (born 1974), New York urban painter
- Jessie Algie (1859–1927), Scottish painter
- Andrew Allan (1863–1942), Scottish lithographer
- David Allan (1744–1796), Scottish historical painter
- Griselda Allan (1905–1987), English flower painter
- Robert Weir Allan (1851–1942), Scottish/English painter
- Rosemary Allan (1911–2008), English artist
- Daphne Allen (1899–1985), English painter
- Kathleen Allen (1906–1983), English painter and muralist
- Alessandro Allori (1535–1607), Italian portrait painter
- Cristofano Allori (1577–1621), Italian portrait painter
- Washington Allston (1779–1843), American poet and painter
- Laura Theresa Alma-Tadema (1852–1909), English painter (second wife of Lawrence Alma-Tadema)
- Lawrence Alma-Tadema (1836–1912), Dutch-born English painter
- Almeida Júnior (1859–1899), Brazilian realist
- Charles Alston (1907–1977), American artist, muralist and teacher
- Margareta Alströmer (1763–1816), Swedish painter and singer
- Rudolf von Alt (1812–1908), Austrian painter
- Albrecht Altdorfer (1480–1538), German painter, print-maker and architect
- Altichiero (1330–1395), Italian painter
- John Altoon (1925–1969), American painter and draftsman
- Pedro Álvarez Castelló (1967–2004), Cuban artist
- Edmond Aman-Jean (1860–1936), French symbolist painter
- Tarsila do Amaral (1886–1973), Brazilian artist
- Christoph Amberger (ca. 1505–1561), German painter
- Friedrich von Amerling (1803–1887), Austro-Hungarian court portrait painter
- Cuno Amiet (1868–1961), Swiss modernist artist
- Jacopo Amigoni (1682–1752), Italian painter
- Rodolfo Amoedo (1857–1941), Brazilian painter and interior designer
- Rick Amor (born 1948), Australian war artist and figurative painter
- An Gyeon (안견, 15th c.), Korean painter
- An Zhengwen (安正文, fl. between 14th and 17th cc.), Chinese painter
- Anna Ancher (1859–1935), Danish pictorial artist
- Michael Ancher (1849–1927), Danish painter
- Marion Ancrum (fl. 1885–1919), Scottish water-colorist
- Werner Andermatt (1916–2013), Swiss painter
- Sophie Gengembre Anderson (1823–1903), French-born English genre painter
- Emma Andijewska (born 1931), Ukrainian surrealist painter, poet and writer
- Ion Andreescu (1850–1882), Romanian impressionist
- Constantine Andreou (1917–2007), Brazilian/Greek painter and sculptor
- Michael Andrews (1928–1995) English painter
- Androbius, painter of classical antiquity
- Anthony Angarola (1893–1929), American painter and print-maker
- Marie Angel (1923–2010), English artist
- Fra Angelico (1387–1445), Early Italian Renaissance
- Heinz Anger (born 1941), Austrian painter
- Hermenegildo Anglada Camarasa (1872–1952), Spanish/Catalan painter
- Gaston Anglade (1854–1919), French impressionist painter
- Charles Angrand (1854–1926), French neo-Impressionist painter and anarchist
- Sofonisba Anguissola (1532–1625), Italian painter
- Peggy Angus (1904–1993), English/Scottish painter and tile and textile designer
- Rita Angus (1908–1970), New Zealand painter
- Albert Anker (1831–1910), Swiss painter and illustrator
- Margit Anna (1913–1991), Hungarian painter
- David Annand (born 1948), Scottish sculptor
- Louis Anquetin (1861–1932), French painter and author
- Pieter van Anraedt (1635–1678), Dutch painter
- Lizzy Ansingh (1875–1959), Dutch painter
- Mary Anne Ansley (fl.1810–1840), English painter
- Horst Antes (born 1936), German painter and sculptor
- Cornelis Anthonisz (ca. 1505–1553), Dutch painter, engraver and cartographer
- Richard Anuszkiewicz (1930–2020), American artist
- Shigeru Aoki (青木繁, 1882–1911), Japanese painter
- Chiho Aoshima (青島千穂, born 1974), Japanese pop artist
- Apelles (4th century BC), Greek painter
- Zvest Apollonio (1935–2009), Italian/Slovenian painter and scenographer
- Karel Appel (1921–2006), Dutch painter, sculptor and poet
- Leonard Appelbee (1914–2000), English painter and print-maker
- Joseph Ignaz Appiani (1706–1785), German painter
- Félix Aráuz (1935–2024), Latin American painter from Ecuador
- Janet Archer (fl.1873–1916), English painter
- Giuseppe Arcimboldo (1527–1593), Italian painter
- Arent Arentsz (1585–1631), Dutch landscape painter
- Avigdor Arikha (1929–2010), Israeli and French painter, print-maker and art historian
- Abram Arkhipov (1862–1930), Russian realist painter
- István Árkossy (born 1943), Hungarian painter and graphic artist
- Edward Armitage (1817–1896), English historical painter
- John Armleder (born 1948), Swiss painter and sculptor
- Hazel Armour (1894–1985), Scottish sculptor and medalist
- John Armstrong (1893–1973), English surrealist artist
- Georg Arnold-Graboné (1896–1982), German impressionist
- Jean Arp (1886–1966), German/French sculptor, painter and poet
- Eugenio de Arriba (1934–1977), Spanish painter
- Art & Language (founded 1968), British conceptual artists, writers and painters
- Richard Artschwager (1923–2013), American painter, illustrator and sculptor
- Asai Chū (浅井忠, 1856–1907), Japanese yōga painter
- Pieter Jansz van Asch (1603–1678), Dutch painter
- Pamela Ascherson (1923–2010), English painter and sculptor
- Ásgrímur Jónsson (1876–1958), Icelandic painter
- Dennis Ashbaugh (born 1946), American painter
- Gigadō Ashiyuki (戯画堂芦幸, early-19th century), Japanese ukiyo-e woodblock print-maker
- Hans Asper (1499–1571), Swiss painter
- Jan Asselijn (1610–1652), Dutch Golden Age painter
- Balthasar van der Ast (1593–1657), Dutch Golden Age painter
- Nikolai Astrup (1880–1928), Norwegian neo-romantic painter and print-maker
- Jean-Michel Atlan (1913–1960), French artist
- René Auberjonois (1872–1957), Swiss artist
- Étienne Aubry (1746–1781), French painter
- Louis-François Aubry (1770–1850), French portrait painter
- Mary Audsley (1919–2008), English painter and sculptor
- John James Audubon (1785–1851), American ornithologist, naturalist and painter
- Frank Auerbach (born 1931), German/English painter
- Jules Robert Auguste (1789–1850), French impressionist painter
- Eric Auld (1931–2013), Scottish painter
- George Ault (1891–1948), American painter
- Cassandra Austen (1773–1845), English water-colorist
- Giuseppe Avanzi (1645–1718), Italian Baroque painter
- Edward Avedisian (1936–2007), American abstract painter
- Hendrick Avercamp (1585–1634), Dutch Baroque landscape painter of the Dutch Golden Age
- Milton Avery (1885–1965), American modern artist
- Edward Ben Avram (born 1941), Indian/Israeli painter
- Nikola Avramov (1897–1945), Bulgarian still-life painter
- Awataguchi Takamitsu (粟田口隆光, fl. between 14th and 16th cc.), Japanese religious painter
- Joan Ayling (1907–1993), English painter
- Ay-O (靉嘔, born 1931), Japanese Fluxus artist
- Aya Goda (合田彩, born 1967), Japanese author and artist
- Anton Ažbe (1870–1949), Slovenian painter and teacher
- Giovanni Bernardino Azzolini or Mazzolini or Asoleni (c. 1572 – c. 1645), Italian painter and sculptor
