= Old Varndeanians =

Old Varndeanians may refer to:

- AFC Varndeanians F.C., a football club formerly known as Old Vardneanians
- Former pupils of Varndean School
