= Lady Sophia Dunbar =

Scottish watercolour painter and antiquarian (1814–1909)

- Born: Sophia Orred; 1814; Tranmere, Cheshire, England
- Died: 1909 (aged 94–95)
- Known for: Watercolour painting; archaeological illustration; antiquarian interests
- Spouse(s): Sir Archibald Dunbar, 7th Baronet (m. 1840)

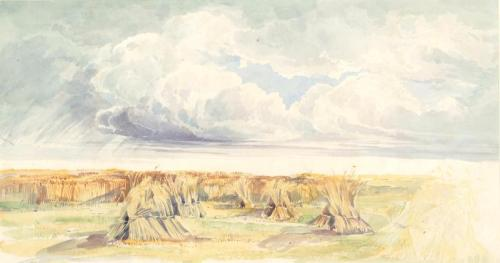
Cornfield with Stormy Sky, watercolour, Aberdeen Art Gallery

Sophia Orred (1814 – 2 June 1909), known after her marriage as Lady Dunbar of Northfield, was an artist and antiquarian based in the historic county of Moray, Scotland. She exhibited watercolour landscapes at the Royal Scottish Academy, the Royal Glasgow Institute of the Fine Arts and the Royal Academy in London and produced archaeological illustrations of nineteenth-century discoveries in northern Scotland. In 1874, she was elected a Lady Associate of the Society of Antiquaries of Scotland.

== Early life and family ==
Sophia Orred was born in 1814, the youngest daughter of George Orred of Tranmere Hall, near Birkenhead, and Elizabeth Woodville. In 1840 she married Sir Archibald Dunbar, 7th Baronet of Northfield, at St Oswald’s Church, Chester, becoming stepmother to his four children. A portrait by the Glasgow artist John Graham-Gilbert depicts her in her wedding dress, said to have been modelled on Queen Victoria’s. The couple went on to have three sons: Randolph John Edward Dunbar (1841–1862), Charles Gordon-Cumming-Dunbar (1844–1916; 9th Baronet) and William James Colquhoun Dunbar (1850–1885). The family home was Duffus House, near Elgin.

== Artistic training and career ==
From childhood Dunbar sketched from nature and was largely self-taught, learning by observation and copying. She received some instruction from the Jersey artist John Le Capelain, whose atmospheric style influenced her early work. After the loss of her eldest son in 1862, she devoted more of her time to painting and began to exhibit: first with the Society of Female Artists in 1863, later with the Royal Scottish Academy and the Royal Glasgow Institute of the Fine Arts (both from 1867). Her Olive Oil Mills at Bordighera appeared at the Royal Academy, London, in 1876.

Her watercolours, noted for their colour and conscientious detail, include A View of an Arab Cemetery, Bujareah near Algiers; Catalan Bay, Gibraltar; and Brown-Sailed Oyster Boats in Normandy. British and Riviera subjects include The Solent from Bournemouth; Cannes from the Road to Grasse; and The Castle of Napoul, near Cannes.

Dunbar’s travels informed her art and writing. Her book A Family Tour Round the Coasts of Spain and Portugal (William Blackwood & Sons, 1862) records a winter journey through Spain, Portugal and North Africa. She met Edward Cooke and John “Spanish” Phillip in Seville and worked in Algiers alongside Barbara Bodichon, with whom she sometimes painted outdoors and in Bodichon’s studio. A contemporary critic groups them as artists seeking “the grand truth of nature”, praising the freshness of their work.

Dunbar also documented material culture encountered abroad. She lent North African artefacts to the Crystal Palace in 1866, having kept drawings of many pieces. Her sketches of Kabyle pottery were later used by the French potter Massier at Vallauris, and she sent a drawing of a large amphora from the Alhambra to the Minton factory.

== Archaeology and antiquarian interests ==
Dunbar took an active part in the antiquarian investigations of her circle in Morayshire, including her husband, Sir Archibald Dunbar, his brother Edward Dunbar-Dunbar of Sea Park, Kinloss, and their associates. In 1866 she wrote to Sir James Young Simpson, the physician, obstetrician and antiquarian, describing her involvement in excavating early Bronze Age cist burials near Hopeman, Roseisle and Covesea and the associated finds. Simpson, who had earlier attended Dunbar during the birth of her third son, was active in the same antiquarian circles. Dunbar’s sketches and watercolours of cists, pottery and jet ornaments survive in Scottish collections and have been used by later researchers to locate and interpret now-lost sites. Two cists were reconstructed at Duffus House in the nineteenth century (since dismantled), and her drawings of a jet spacer-plate necklace and Food Vessel fragments are among the few detailed records of those discoveries.

Dunbar also reported carved symbols in the coastal caves at Sculptor’s Cave, Covesea, prompting further documentation by John Stuart for his Sculptured Stones of Scotland (1867). That observation and work helped to establish Sculptor’s Cave as a key Pictish site, and the location was later excavated by Sylvia Benton in 1928–30. Dunbar’s careful visual recording was a valuable early contribution to archaeological illustration in Scotland.

== Later life and legacy ==
Dunbar exhibited a work at the RSA for the final time in 1888. She died at Duffus House in 1909, aged 95, and is buried in St Peter’s Kirkyard, Duffus.

The exhibition From Elgin to the Alhambra (Aberdeen Art Gallery, 1987–88) examined Dunbar's landscape practice. Recent scholarship has re-evaluated her role in early Scottish archaeology, particularly her documentation of Sculptor’s Cave.
