= Catriona Millar =

Scottish artist (born 1956)

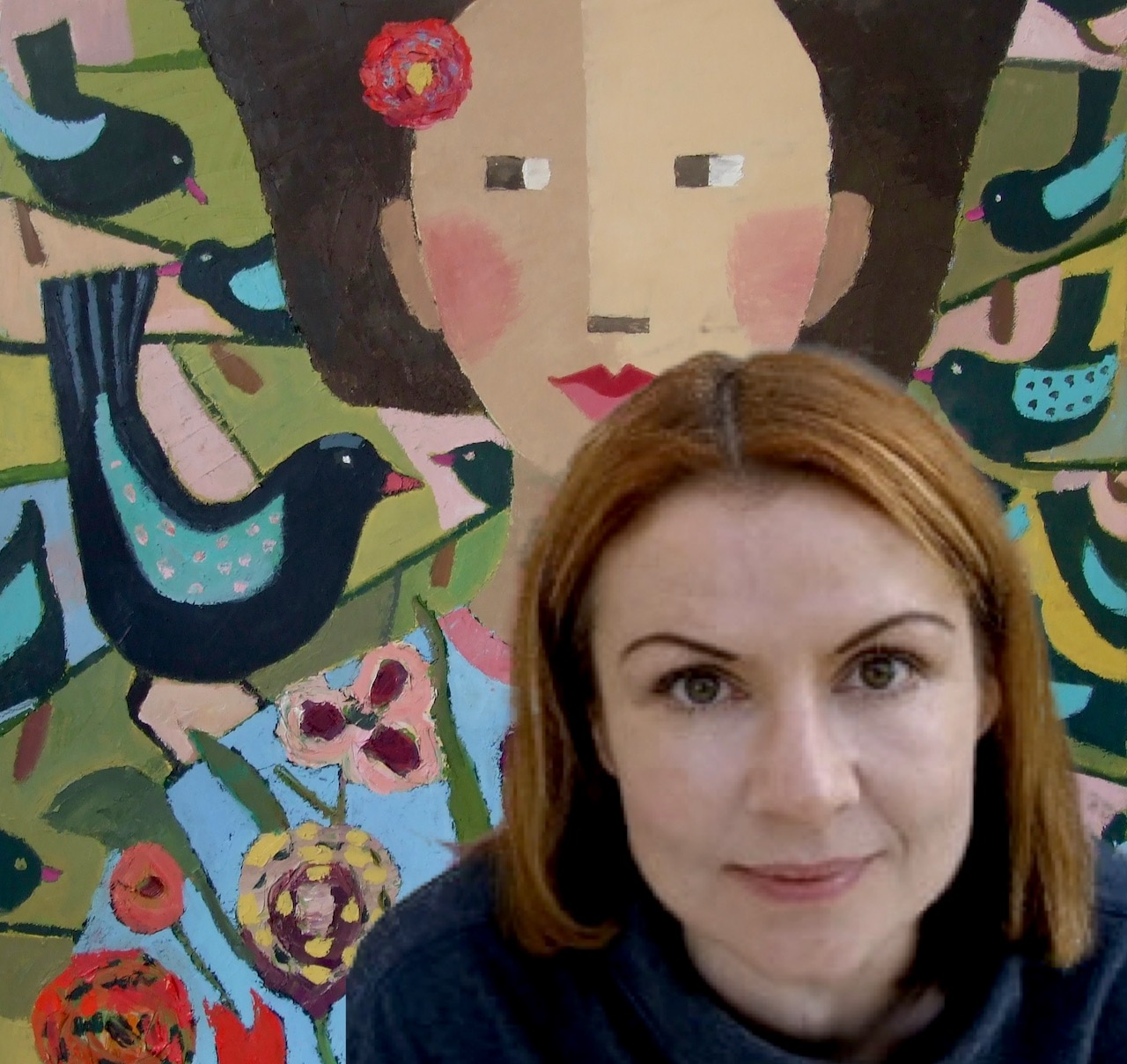
Catriona Millar and her painting Dawn Chorus

Catriona Millar (born 1956) is one of Scotland's foremost figurative painters. Born in Milngavie, Glasgow, she studied at Harrogate School of Art and Grays School of Art, Aberdeen, where her tutors included Joyce Cairns RSA and Keith Grant. Since the success of her sell-out 2005 degree show she has achieved an international reputation and exhibited across the UK and Europe including the Royal Scottish Academy, Edinburgh. Her works are in both private and public collections including The Reiff Collection. In October 2006 she came to the attention of Charles Saatchi with her first solo exhibition at the Dundas Street Gallery, Edinburgh. In April 2007 The Herald ranked her in the top five most collectable artists in Scotland. Her paintings can be seen on book jackets and CD covers while many schools and colleges around the world study her work. Catriona Millar works with several charities including, Art on a Postcard, St Columba's Hospice Care, Edinburgh and St Wilfred's Hospice.

Camille and Little Wing by Catriona Millar (2026 oil on canvas)

Little Wing by Catriona Millar (2006 oil on canvas)

In April 2025 after partnering with the Australian couturier Ruth Groundwater, Millar started work on a set of non-figurative oil paintings. These paintings became the core of the artist's 'Botannica' series which she continues to develop alongside her figurative work.

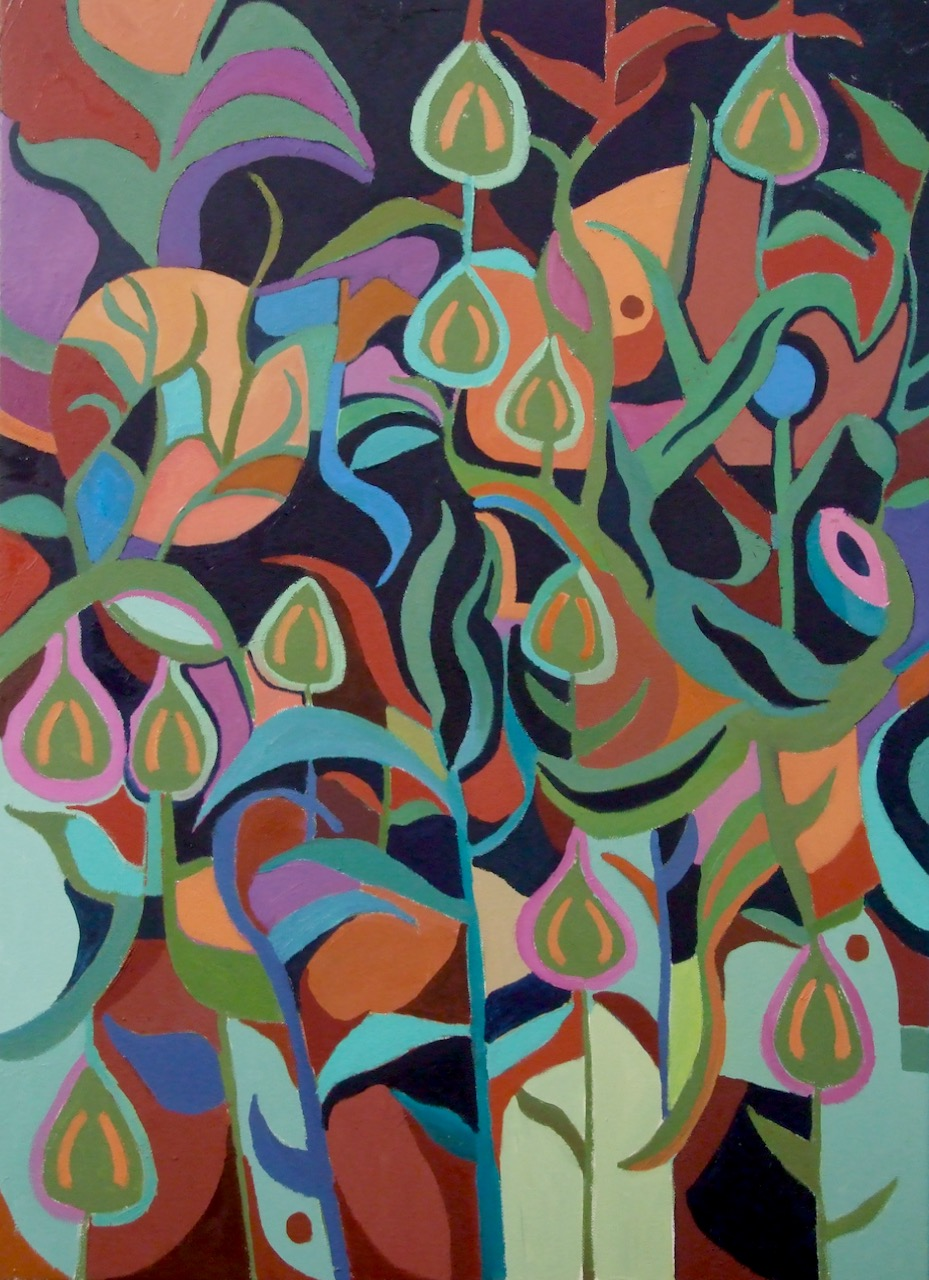
Capricorn Nouveau by Catriona MIllar (2026)

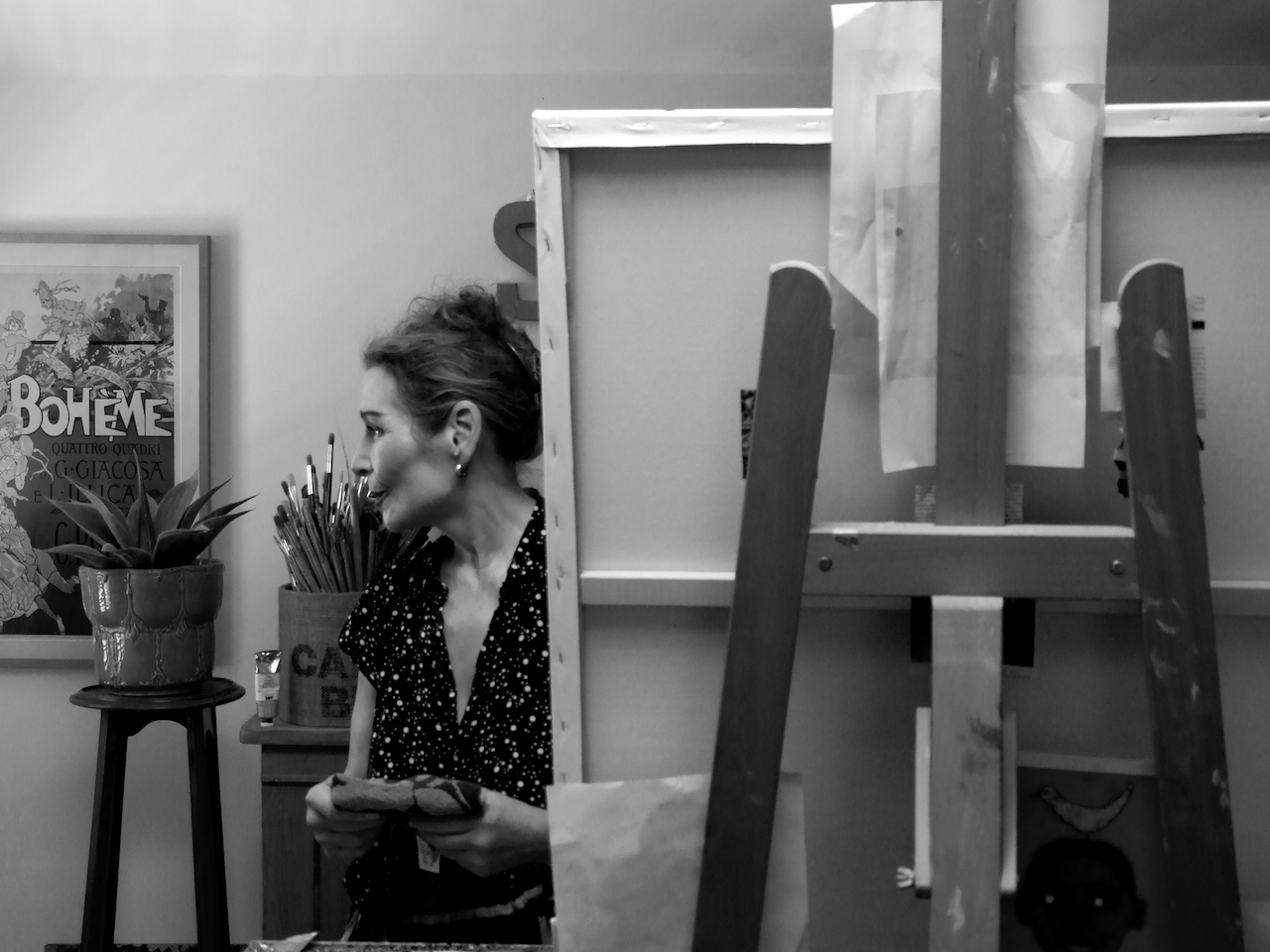
The artist Catriona Millar in her studio

Catriona Millar is married to the Scottish columnist and Arts Critic Roddy Phillips. Catriona Millar is a descendant of the Scottish fiddler William Marshall who collaborated with Robert Burns and who is credited with the invention of The Strathspey Reel. Catriona Millar is also a descendant of Alexander Marshall Mackenzie who designed amongst many notable landmarks The Waldorf Hotel in London. In 2012 Catriona Millar was listed in 'Who's Who in Scotland'.

Georgette and Cyprus by Catriona Millar (oil on canvas 2026)

“Catriona Millar’s paintings draw the viewer in with vibrant colours, intricate patterns, and intriguing characters. Yet beneath their decorative richness lies a world of subtle emotions, unspoken relationships, and stories waiting to be discovered.” USA Art News

"Like many Scottish painters Catriona Millar is a true colourist. Colour and pattern define her work but beneath the surface they portray the full spectrum of the human condition – joy, hope, longing and melancholy and often alongside an animal companion." - Elspeth Bray, former V&A curator, Deputy Editor of the Apollo Magazine.

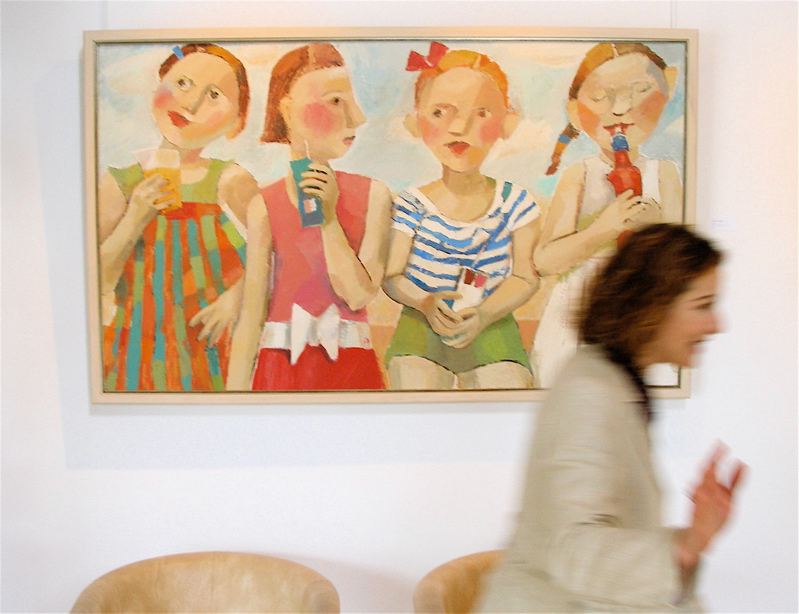
Catriona Millar and her painting Holiday

"Up close the viewer is tempted to reach out and touch the canvas, so packed is it with paint. While this might be seen as simply a preferred painting technique, the depth of character and subtle nuances of narrative that Catriona Millar achieves is what sets her figurative work apart from anything else you’ll see." – Homes & Interiors Magazine

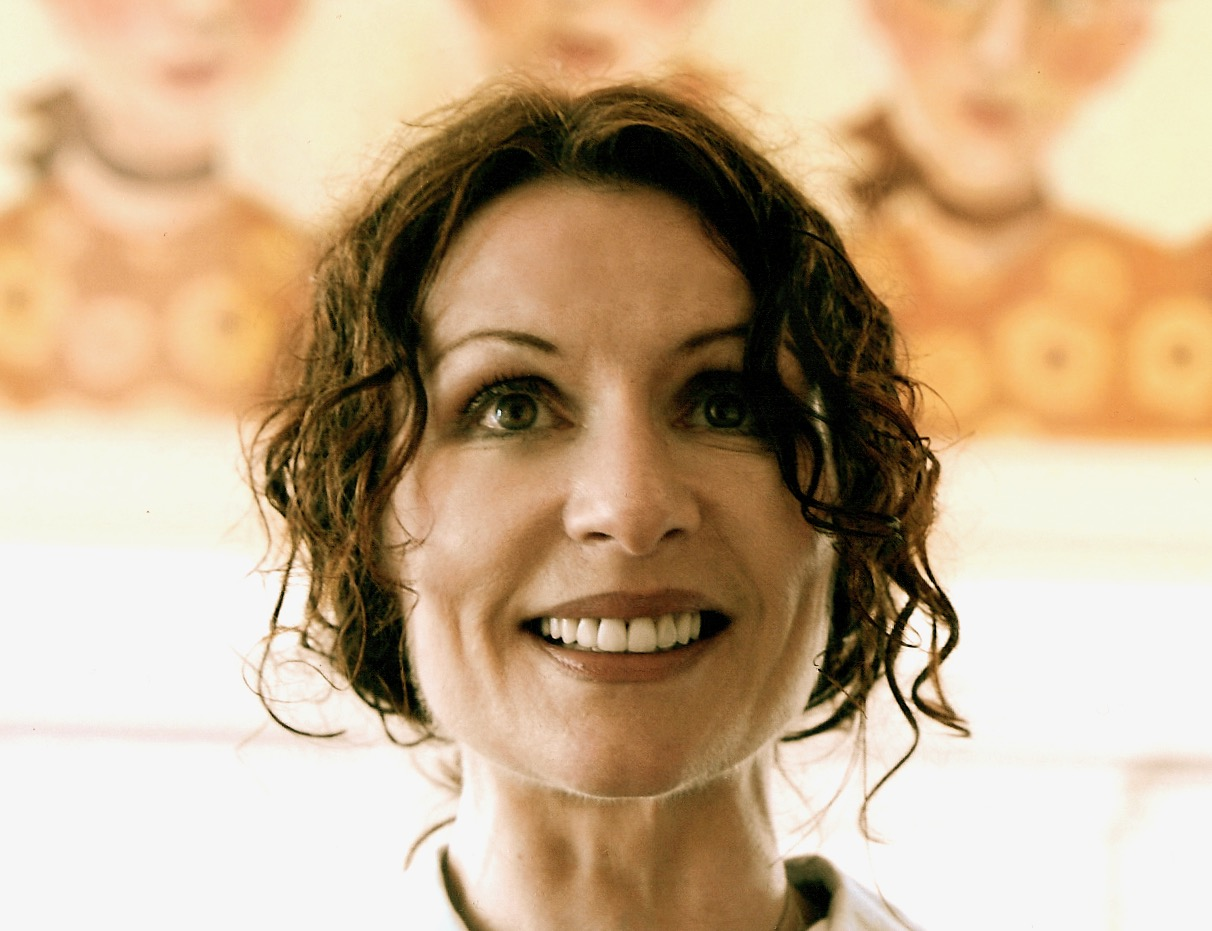
The Scottish Figurative artist Catriona Millar
