= Mabel Dawson =

Scottish artist (1887–1965)

- Born: 13 October 1887; Edinburgh, Scotland
- Died: 1965 (aged 77–78)
- Education: Edinburgh College of Art
- Known for: Painting

Mabel Dawson (13 October 1887 – 1965) was a Scottish artist who painted a wide variety of subjects, including animals and birds, in both watercolour and tempera.

== Biography ==
Dawson was born in Edinburgh and studied at the Edinburgh College of Art before continuing her artistic training in London at the school of animal painting run by William Frank Calderon in Kensington. She returned to Edinburgh, where she lived for the majority of her life and maintained a studio, first at 130 George Street and then, from 1943 at Palmerston Place. Dawson became known for her paintings of animals, flowers and birds but also painted landscapes of the fishing villages on the Scottish east coast and historical scenes. Dawson was also considered skilled at embroidery and undertook decorative work. During the 1930s she produced designs for the Scottish Society for the Protection of Wild Birds.

Dawson was a prolific exhibitor showing over ninety works at both the Royal Glasgow Institute of the Fine Arts and the Royal Scottish Watercolour Society during her career. She showed some 78 works at the Royal Scottish Academy and exhibited at least once with both the Royal Academy and the Aberdeen Artists Society. She was elected to the Society of Scottish Artists in 1907 and to the Royal Scottish Watercolour Society ten years later. Newport Museum and Art Gallery hold examples of her work.
