= Nancy Jane Burton =

Scottish artist (1891–1972)

- Born: 1891; Insh, Inverness-shire, Scotland
- Died: 15 August 1972 (aged 80–81)
- Education: Glasgow School of Art
- Known for: Animal paintings
- Elected: Glasgow Society of Lady Artists

Nancy Jane Burton (1891 – 15 August 1972) was a Scottish artist known for her animal paintings. She is considered one of Scotland's leading animal painters of the first half of the twentieth century.

== Biography ==
Burton was born at Insh in Inverness-shire in the Scottish Highlands. She attended the Glasgow School of Art from 1909 to 1915, gaining her diploma in 1914. She taught art at a school in Callander and for a time lived at Aberfoyle, Stirling before moving to a farm at Tyndrum in Perthshire. In the early 1930s she visited her sister in northern India. Originally planned as a six-month trip, Burton's talents as an animal painter attracted a large number of commissions and so she decided to stay and took a house in Rawalpindi. She eventually spent four years in the region, travelling and painting, mostly in watercolour, in areas of northern India and modern-day Pakistan, Kashmir and Afghanistan.

From the mid-1920s, Burton was a member of the Glasgow Society of Lady Artists and won their Lauder Award in 1924, in 1931 and in 1946 and 1953. She was a prolific exhibitor, especially with the Royal Glasgow Institute of the Fine Arts but also with the Royal Scottish Academy, the Aberdeen Artists Society and the Royal Scottish Watercolour Society. Works by Burton were also shown at the Walker Art Gallery in Liverpool.
