= Mary Davidson (artist) =

Scottish artist (1865–1951)

- Born: 1865; Aberdeenshire, Scotland
- Died: 1951 (aged 85–86)
- Known for: Painting

Mary C. Davidson (1865–1951) was a Scottish artist, notable for her landscape and flower paintings.

== Biography ==
Davidson was born in Aberdeenshire and grew up in Aboyne, one of ten children in a well-known local family. She painted landscapes in both Scotland and France. In 1936 Davidson visited India where, among other landscapes, she produced a series of paintings of the mosque at Kohat, now in modern-day Pakistan. Davidson lived in Edinburgh for many years but gave up her art career for an extended period to care for her parents and only resumed painting after their deaths, but failing eyesight cut short her own career.

Davidson had twenty-four paintings exhibited at the Royal Scottish Academy between 1906 and 1936. In 1936 she was elected a member of the Royal Watercolour Society, who showed some 44 of her works during her career. She was also a regular exhibitor with both the Aberdeen Artists Society and the Royal Glasgow Institute of the Fine Arts.
