= Ivy Gardner Proudfoot =

Scottish artist (1894–1975)

- Born: Jane Hunter Fergusson Gardner; 1894; Gourock, Renfrewshire
- Died: 1975 (aged 80–81)
- Education: Glasgow School of Art
- Known for: Sculpture
- Spouse: Alexander Proudfoot (married 1955)

Ivy Gardner Proudfoot (also known as Jane Ivy Hunter Fergusson Proudfoot) (1894–1975) was active as a sculptor and modeller of mainly figurative pieces between 1920 and 1957. Her specialty was sculptural portraits of children. She was born in Greenock, where the McClean Museum and Art Gallery hold her work but spent the majority of her working life living in Glasgow. Gardner attended the Glasgow School of Art between 1914 and 1925, and later became a member of the Glasgow Society of Lady Artists. She was seen to show great promise so later became the assistant to sculptors Benno Schotz and Alexander Proudfoot (1878–1957) whom she married two years before he died.

== Exhibitions ==
She exhibited at the Glasgow Institute of Fine Arts, the Royal Scottish Academy in Edinburgh, the Walker Art Gallery in Liverpool, and the Royal Academy in London. A member of the Soroptimist International Glasgow West Club. Won the Lauder Award four times between 1929 and 1953. Her works include The Blind Beggar (1927), The Wounded Bird (1935), Head of a Child (1936), Design for a Duck Pond (1938), and Madonna and Child (1951).

== See also ==
- List of Scottish women artists
