= Annie Rose Laing =

British artist (1869–1946)

- Born: Annie Rose Low; 20 January 1869; Glasgow, Scotland
- Died: 1946 (aged 76–77); Uckfield, England
- Education: Glasgow School of Art
- Known for: Painting

Annie Rose Laing née Annie Rose Low (20 January 1869 – 1946) was a Scottish artist, known for her paintings of landscapes, children and interiors.

== Biography ==
Laing was born in Glasgow and studied at the Glasgow School of Art from 1888 to 1894, when she won a Haldane Travelling Scholarship which allowed her to study in Paris under Jean-Paul Laurens. Laing subsequently lived at Frascati in Italy and in London for a time but most of her life was spent in Glasgow. She joined the Glasgow Society of Lady Artists in 1908, the same year in which she married the artist James Garden Laing. Laing mostly exhibited her work in Scotland, being a regular exhibitor with the Royal Glasgow Institute of the Fine Arts and, less frequently, with both the Royal Scottish Academy and the Aberdeen Artists Society. Laing also took part in exhibitions in both Munich and Rome during 1911 and at the Walker Art Gallery in Liverpool and had at least three works shown at the Royal Academy in London. She died at Uckfield in Sussex. The Kelvingrove Art Gallery and Museum in Glasgow holds examples of her paintings.

== Gallery ==
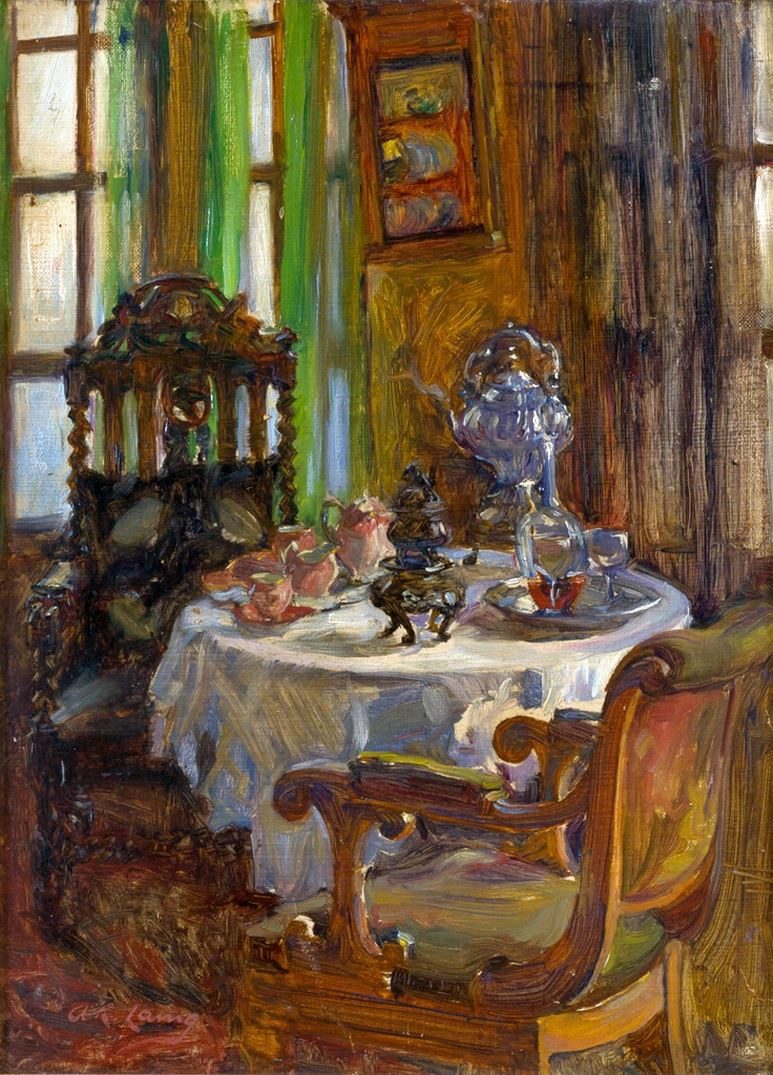
Interior, oil on canvas 38 x 28 cm

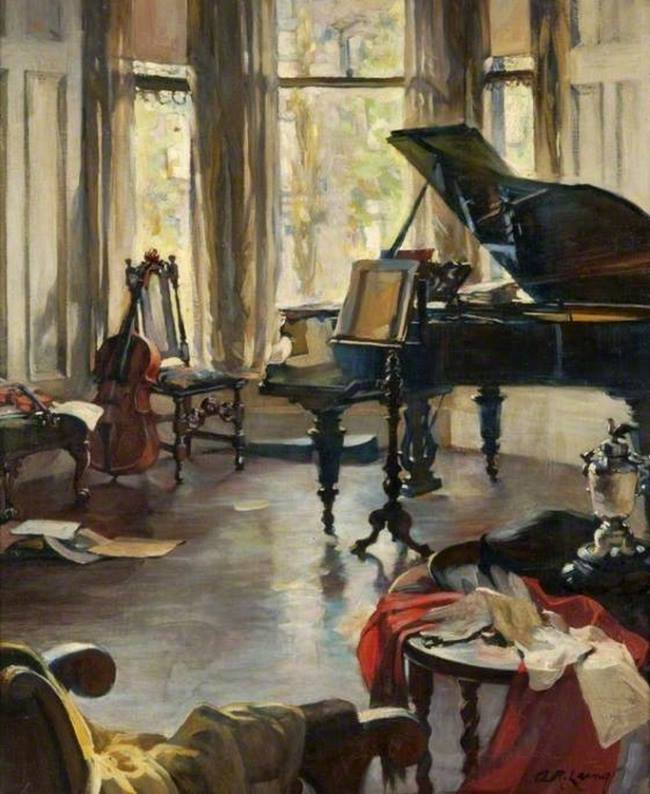
After Rehearsal (ca. 1922), oil on canvas 74 x 61.4 cm

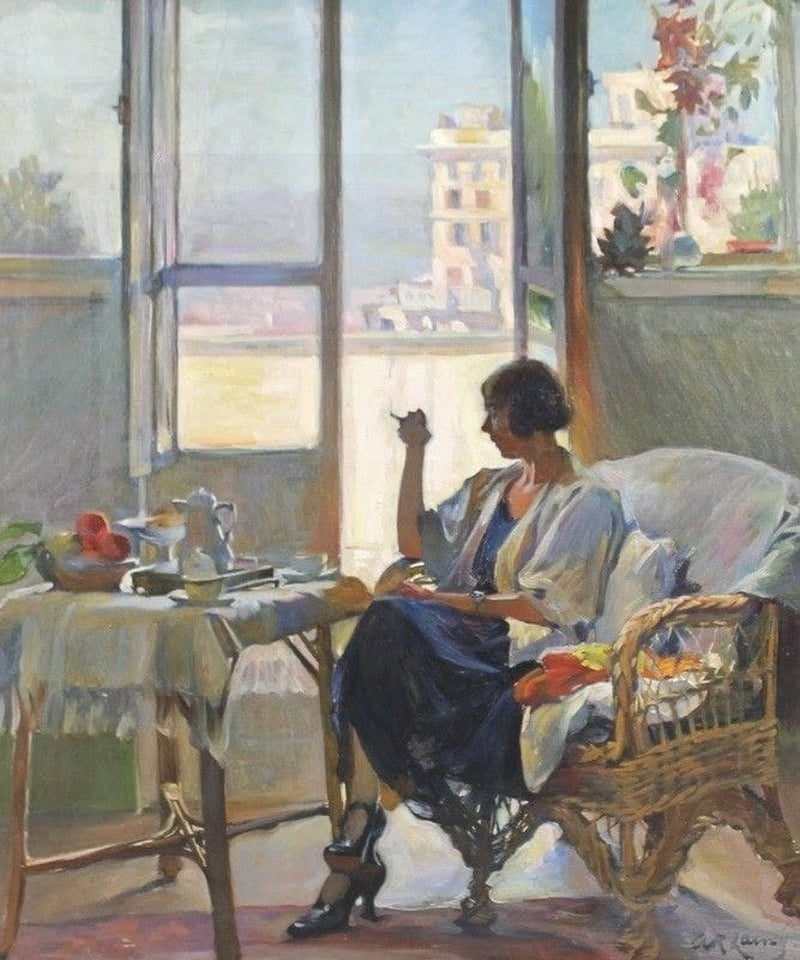
Lady at the Breakfast Table, oil on canvas 68 x 58 cm

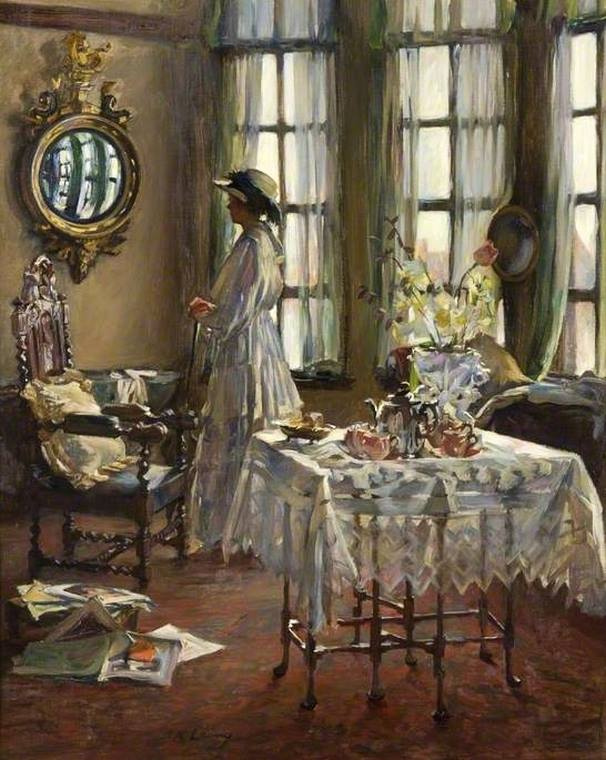
The Mirror (ca. 1919), oil on canvas 66 x 53.3 cm
