= Marjorie Evans =

Scottish artist

Marjorie Evans, later Marjorie Scott Elliot (c.1850–1907) was a Scottish artist known for her flower paintings.

== Biography ==
Evans spent most of her life in Aberdeen but was also resident in Richmond in London for a substantial period. She painted flowers, still-life scenes, landscapes and sometimes portraits, working in both oil and watercolours. Evans was elected to the Royal Scottish Watercolour Society in 1891 but resigned from the Society in 1902. She exhibited two paintings of roses at the Royal Academy in London in 1892 and also in 1895. She also exhibited with the Aberdeen Artists Society and the Royal Scottish Academy.
