= Lady Marianne Isobel Moncrieff =

Scottish artistic designer (1875–1961)

- Born: 21 December 1875; Glasgow, Scotland
- Died: 28 September 1961 (aged 85); Edinburgh, Scotland
- Occupation: Monart Glassware Designer
- Spouse(s): John Moncrieff, married 19 April 1904

Isobel Moncrieff (1875 – 28 September 1961) was an artistic designer of Monart Art Glassware in Perth, Scotland between 1924-1934. Due to the era she was never officially made a director. While the Ysart family had the technical know-how to create the glassware within the Monart Glassworks, it was Moncrieff's designs which were the basis for their world-renowned coloured glass pieces. Queen Mary was an admirer of the glassware and 33 glassware pieces were designed and commissioned by her to be presented as Perth's gift to Queen Elizabeth and Prince Philip on their wedding.

== Early years ==
Moncrieff was born Marianne Isobel Dunlop on 21 December 1874, the youngest of seven, at 20 Lynedoch Street, Glasgow. The name "Marianne" was chosen as the closest baptismal name to that of her aunt 'Mary Anne'. She preferred to be addressed as Isobel according to her nephew Dr James Percival Agnew L.L.D in his reminiscences of his aunt in Michael Thomas Vaughan's short bibliography "Scottish Art Glass, Women and Design".

She had one sister and five brothers. Her father Matthew Dunlop was a flour and grain importer. Her mother Margaret Waters Ure had a brother, John Ure, L.L.D., who was the Lord Provost of Glasgow (1880–1883), deputy lieutenant of Lanarkshire (1882), Deacon of the Incorporate of Bakers (1854 & 1857), Dean of Guild, an ancient city office (1890–91). He declined a knighthood for personal reasons. One brother, Nathanial Harvey Dunlop, married in London to Kate Louise Christie, who had been the childhood playmate of Queen Mary.

Isobel was educated in Glasgow at the Dame school and considered herself a young lady. On 19 April 1904, she married John Moncreiff, who owned a company in Perth that manufactured industrial glass products.

== Career ==
Although not registered as a Directory Designer of Monart Glass, it was Moncrieff's artistic nature that convinced her husband to diversify the company’s range to include decorative glassware. She identified the potential of Salvador Ysart and his family, who had been recruited to produce laboratory glass, to create glassware to her own designs. The brand Monart was a portmanteau of MONcreiff and ysART, with Moncreiff taking a lead role in its production.

The pieces produced by Monart were supplied to Watson's of Perth, on Perth High Street, on a sale or return basis. They exhibited at the British Industries Fair with special one-off pieces, and Queen Mary never failed to visit. She was presented with two bowls, one outspreading and one inverted. On the occasion of the wedding of Princess Elizabeth and Prince Philip, 33 pieces of Monart Glass designed by Isobel, as well as table linen, were sent to them as a wedding gift from the city of Perth. A letter to the then Provost was received from Princess Elizabeth. These pieces can be found in the audits of Balmoral Castle with only 32 pieces left.

After Moncrieff left the Monart Works, the Ysart family continued to produce glassware but in her opinion the colours became garish, and lost some of their refinement.

== Personal life ==
She honeymooned in America and visited such places as the Carnegie Steel works at Detroit and the White House, meeting President Theodore Roosevelt on a guided tour. Returning early from honeymoon due to her father's failing health, she and her husband set up home in Perth and took part in the social and civic life. Isobel and John lived in SummerBank, Isla Road, Perth.

Moncrieff mixed with the likes of the Duchess of Atholl. She was involved in Perth Theatre and invited the cast to their house. She hosted tennis parties and soirees. Moncrieff was known as a vivacious and charming personality, with a great love of the theatre and musical life in Perth, and was closely involved in setting up Perth Music Festival.

Her portrait was painted in pastel and goauche by society artist Wolfgang Craig Hainisch (1905-1995) and titled Lady Marianne Isobel Moncrieff, though there is no evidence of her having that title. The portrait depicts a lady in her later years, with a very kind face and wonderful blue eyes. She is wearing a sea-green dress with a fur coat over it and has on a pearl necklace and pearl drop earrings.

Moncrieff had miscarriages and she and her husband had no living children to inherit their estate, which was therefore left to their nephews.

== Death and legacy ==
Moncrieff died on 28 September 1961, aged 85, in an Edinburgh hospital after operations for throat cancer.

In 2022, a series of wire statues of notable Perth women, including Moncreiff, was created in Perth by the Raise the Roof project. The Wire Women were part of Perth and Kinross 'Year of Stories' with community groups, creatives and cultural organisations sharing the stories of women.

Moncreiff was No 13 of 20 wire sculptures which were set out in a trail around Perth City Centre and was situated outside 2 High Street, Perth. The research on Moncreiff was carried out by the Sparks group in Kinross and they created a glass window to commemorate the occasion.
