= James Kay (artist) =

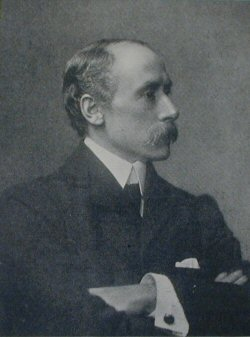
- James Kay, sometime prior to 1909
- Born: 1858; Lamlash, Isle of Arran, Scotland
- Died: 1942 (aged 83–84); Portincaple, Scotland
- Notable work: River of the North, Launch of the Lusitania
- Awards: Gold medal, Paris Salon 1903

James Kay (22 October 1858 - 26 September 1942) was a Scottish artist notable for his paintings of the landscapes and shipping around the River Clyde. Born on the Isle of Arran, Kay spent much of his working life with a studio in Glasgow and living at Portincaple on Loch Long in Argyll and Bute. He was elected to the Royal Scottish Society of Painters in Watercolour (RSW) in 1906 and to the Royal Scottish Academy in 1938. He had one daughter, artist Violet McNeish Kay.

== Early life and training ==
Kay was born on 22 October 1858 at Lamlash on the Isle of Arran, son of Thomas Kay, a chief petty officer in the British Royal Navy, and Violet McNeish. He trained at the Glasgow School of Art.

== Painter ==
Primarily a landscape artist, Kay is best known for his portrayals of "the glory of the busy shipping reaches of the Clyde". He showed great originality, influenced by the emergence of impressionism of the 1880s.

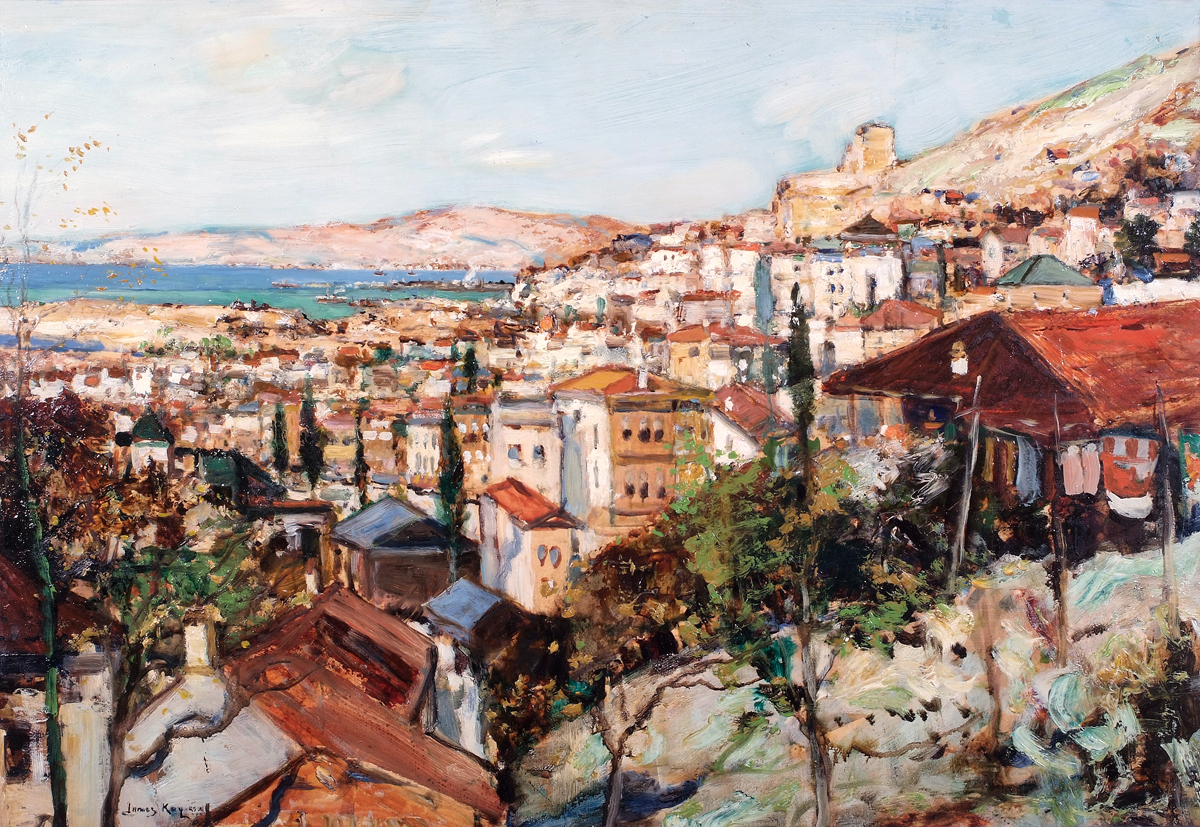
Gibraltar

Active from the late 1880s, Kay achieved regular recognition at exhibitions in Europe. He exhibited at the Salon in Paris in 1894, and at 1895's La Libre Esthétique in Brussels was awarded an honourable mention. In 1903 his painting Toil and Grime was awarded the silver medal at the Société des Amis des Arts in Rouen, while another work, River of the North, won the gold medal at the Paris Salon. In 1907 his painting Launch of the Lusitania was purchased by the Corporation of Glasgow for the city's art collection. Pastels by him in the later 1930s include Crossraguel Abbey (Maybole, Ayrshire) and Lochranza.

In 1911, Kay met and married Ada Laval, who was from Mauritius. They had one child, Violet McNeish Kay, in 1914; she went on to become an artist, and died in 1971.

Kay was elected to the Royal Scottish Society of Painters in Watercolour (RSW) in 1906 and to the Royal Scottish Academy in 1938. Kay was also a member of Glasgow Art Club with which he exhibited.
