= Violet McNeish Kay =

British artist (1914–1971)

- Born: 18 June 1914; Glasgow, Scotland
- Died: 3 March 1971 (aged 56); Helensburgh, Scotland
- Education: Glasgow School of Art
- Known for: Painting

Violet McNeish Kay (18 June 1914 – 3 March 1971) was a Scottish artist who painted landscapes in oils and watercolours.

== Biography ==
Kay was born in Glasgow where her father, James Kay was an established artist. Violet Kay studied at the Glasgow School of Art between 1931 and 1933 and joined the Glasgow Society of Lady Artists in 1935 and later, in 1948, won their Lauder Award. She was elected a member of the Royal Scottish Watercolour Society in 1948 and regularly exhibited with that Society and also showed some sixty paintings with the Royal Glasgow Institute of the Fine Arts and showed at least once with the Aberdeen Artists Society. Both the Pilgrim Trust and the local authority in Paisley purchased examples of her work. Kay lived at Garelochhead and often painted landscapes of the Scottish west coast using bold areas of strong colours. She died at Helensburgh on 3 March 1971. She had a heart attack while country dancing.
