= Varndean School =

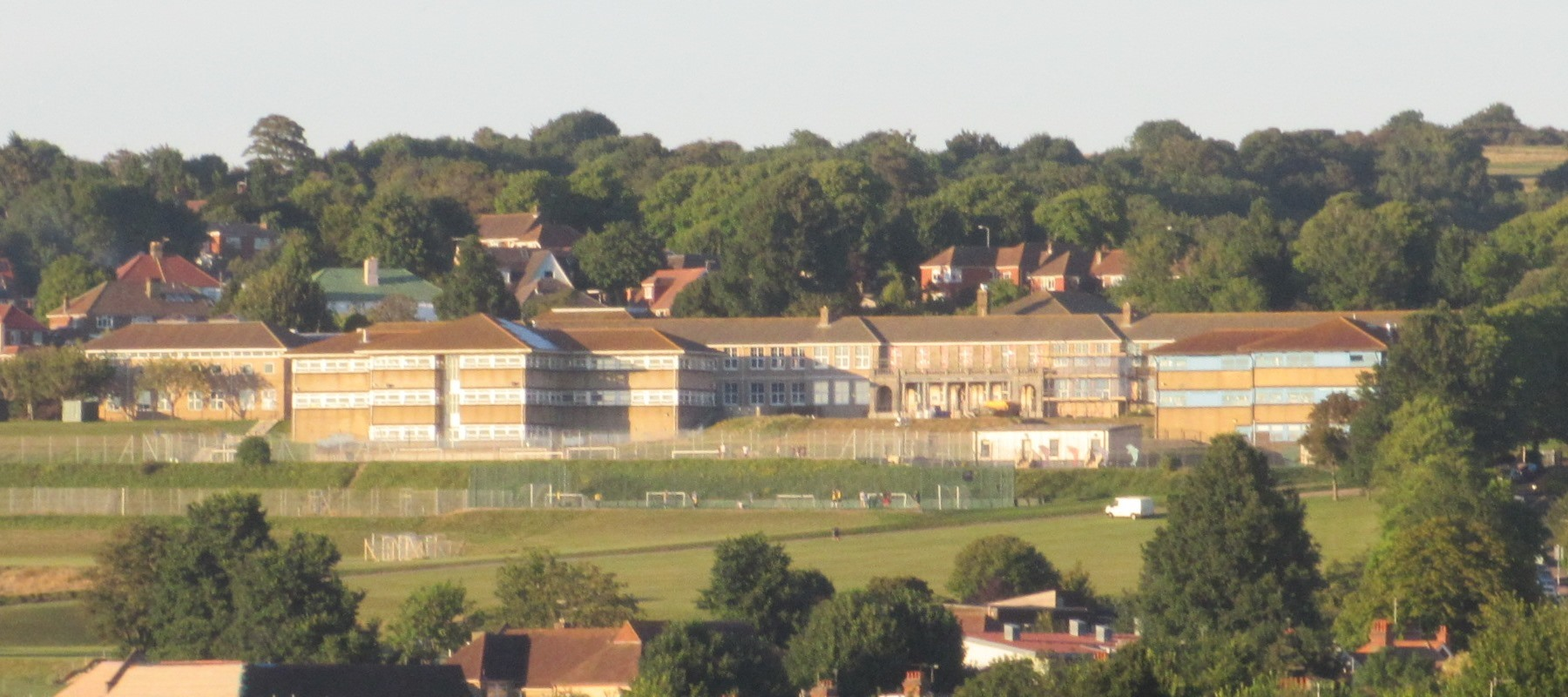

Location
- Balfour Road; Brighton and Hove, East Sussex, Brighton; England; 50°51′01″N 0°08′14″W

Information
- Type: Community school
- Motto: Challenge and Pride
- Established: 1884
- Local authority: Brighton and Hove
- Department for Education URN: 114579 Tables
- Ofsted: Reports
- Chair of governing body: Ian Rodgers
- Headteacher: Shelley Baker
- Staff: 170
- Gender: Coeducational
- Age: 11 to 16
- Enrolment: 1498
- Houses: Angelou, Russell, Turing, Ellis, Lennox
- Website: http://www.varndean.co.uk/

Varndean School is a secondary school serving a large area of Brighton and Hove, England.

In 2013, 2017 and 2022, Ofsted inspectors described Varndean as a 'Good' school. Varndean shares the Surrenden Campus with Balfour Primary School, Dorothy Stringer School, Varndean College and Downs View Link college.

== History ==
Varndean was founded in 1884 in central Brighton as York Place Higher Grade School. The name changed to Brighton Municipal Secondary School for Girls in 1905. During World War I, the York Place buildings were taken over for use as an Indian Military Hospital and were not returned until 1919.

In 1926, the school moved to a new site on the outskirts of Brighton. It was renamed Varndean School for Girls, after the nearby farm. The new building was opened by the Duchess of Atholl.

During World War II half the school evacuated to the Holme Valley in West Yorkshire.

The School was a grammar school for girls until the comprehensive movement and the take-over of Brighton by East Sussex County Council saw the educational system reorganised. Between 1975 and 1979, Varndean Grammar School for Girls became Varndean High School.

The original building design from 1926 has been both modified and expanded since to accommodate increased pupil numbers. In the original building, several rooms have been converted into IT suites and extensions made to house new Mathematics rooms, a Music suite and extra PE facilities, such as a Fitness Suite and a Dance Studio. A sports hall, AstroTurf and 3G pitches have also been added.

In 2012, a house system was introduced to Varndean, with four houses being instated: Angelou, Turing, Russell and Ellis. A fifth house, Lennox, was introduced in 2020.

Several Pygmy goats were introduced in September 2016 and were cared for by students. The goats were initially being rehomed and intended to control grass, but their therapeutic effects were recognised. In April 2021, the goats were moved to Ferring Country Centre during construction works at the school, but are now there permanently. In 2022, several Continental Giant Rabbits were introduced as the school's new therapy animals, followed by a herd of guinea pigs in the autumn.

== Headteachers ==
Below is a list of all the headteachers of the school.

- 1884–1894 M. Brion
- 1894–1901 A. North
- 1901–1909 L. Hilton
- 1909–1937 E. Ellis
- 1937–1961 M. Warmington (Varndean School for Girls)
- 1961–1977 R. Clarke (Varndean School for Girls)
- 1977–1986 M. Smithers
- 1986–1999 P. Bowmaker
- 1999–2008 A. Schofield
- 2009–2021 W. Deighan
- 2021– S. Baker

== Reception ==
For three consecutive visits in 2013, 2017 and 2022, Ofsted inspectors described Varndean as a 'Good' school.

== Notable alumni ==
=== Athletics ===
- Steve Ovett, Olympic athlete

=== Footballers ===
- Lewis Dunk, international footballer (England, Brighton & Hove Albion)
- Tommy Fraser, professional footballer (Brighton & Hove Albion, Port Vale, Barnet, Whitehawk, Ebbsfleet United, Peacehaven & Telscombe, Lewes, Burgess Hill Town, Bognor Regis Town)
- Darren Freeman, professional footballer and manager (Brighton & Hove Albion, Fulham, Gillingham, Brentford, Whitehawk, Peacehaven & Telscombe, Lewes)
- Steve Gill, professional footballer (West Ham United, Hastings United, Bognor Regis Town, Worthing, Whitehawk)
- Allan Gunn, international football referee and semi-professional footballer (Whitehawk, Gravesend & Northfleet
- Russell Martin, football manager (Leicester City, Rangers, Southampton, Swansea City, MK Dons) and international footballer (Scotland, Rangers, Norwich City, Peterborough United, Wycombe Wanderers)

=== Law ===
- Helena Normanton, the first woman to join an institution of the legal profession, second woman to be called to the Bar of England and Wales, first British married woman to have a passport in the name she was born with. Pupil when school called York Place Higher Grade School.

=== Media ===
- Alfie Deyes, YouTuber (PointlessBlog, NME Awards, William Hill Casino TV)
- Des Lynam, broadcaster

=== Theatre and television ===
- Paul Scofield, actor
- Amita Suman, actress (Shadow and Bone, Doctor Who, Casualty, Ackley Bridge)
