= Portincaple =

Coordinates: 56°6′6″N 4°50′17″W

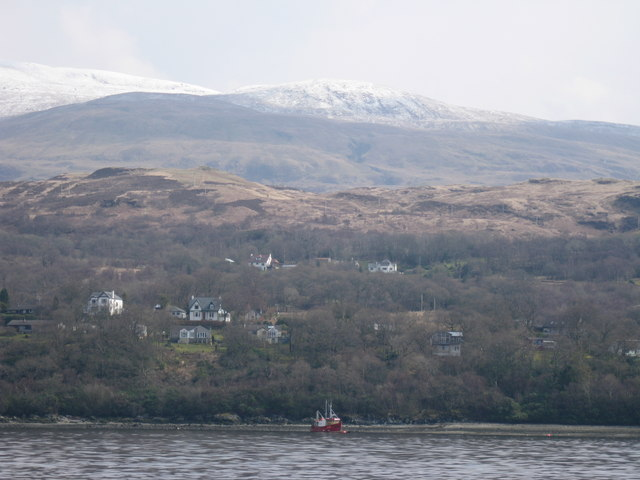
Portincaple

Portincaple is a hamlet on the shores of Loch Long in Argyll and Bute, Scotland. It was once a fishing village sending its catch to market via the old railway station at Whistlefield.

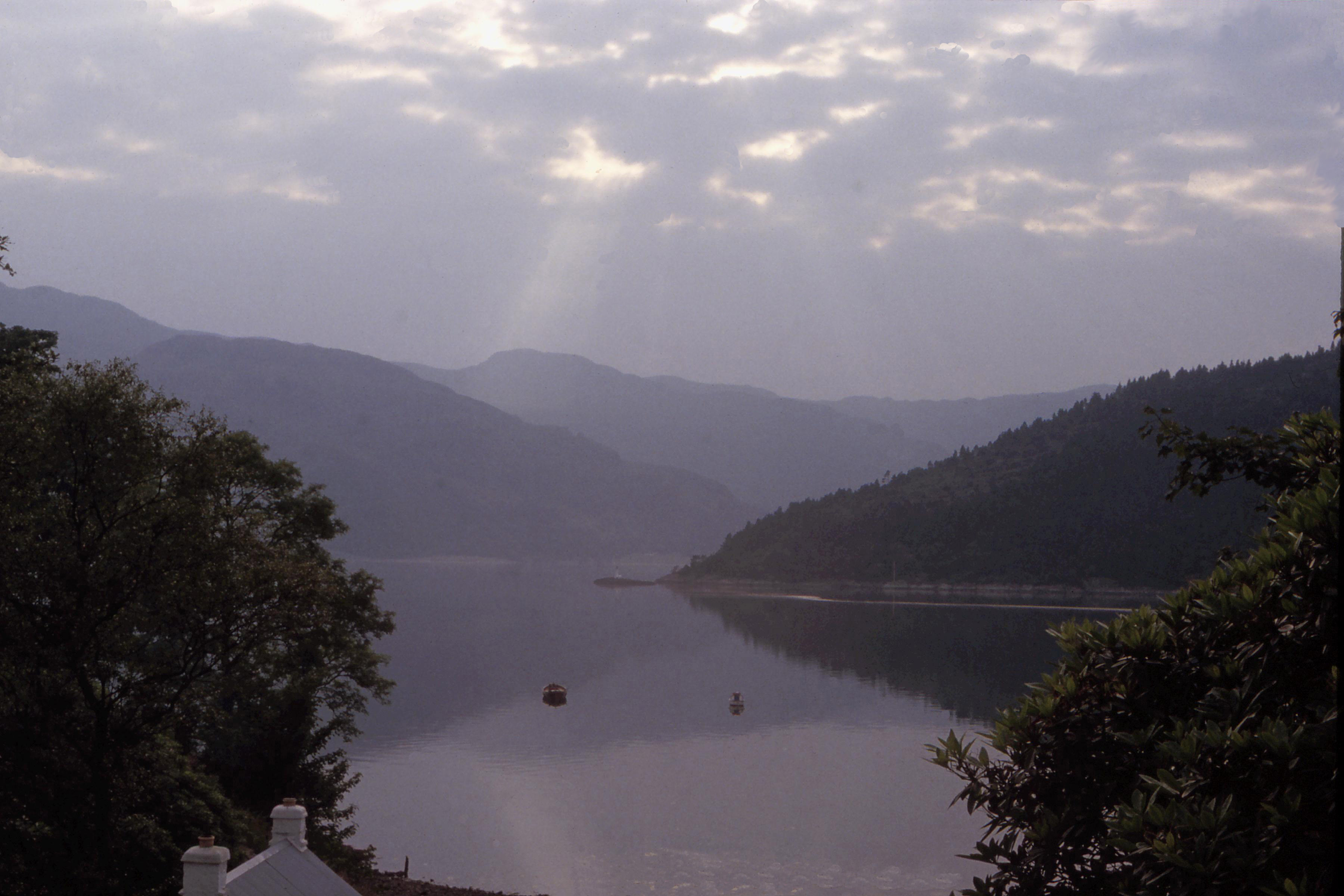
The view of Loch Goil and Loch Long from Portincaple.

For thirty years until his death in 1942, Portincaple was the home of Scottish artist James Kay.

Whistlefield, later Whistlefield Halt, was a station 10.30 miles (16.58 kilometres) from Craigendoran Junction railway station served the hamlet of Portincaple and the surrounding area. Opened in 1896 by the West Highland Railway, it was built on a single track section without a passing loop in between Garelochhead and Glen Douglas and closed by the British Railways Board in 1964.
