= Allan Gwynne-Jones =

English painter

Allan Gwynne-Jones CBE DSO RA
- Born: 27 March 1892; Richmond, London, England
- Died: 5 August 1982 (aged 90)
- Education: Slade School of Fine Art
- Known for: Paintings
- Style: Watercolours
- Spouse: Rosemary Allan

Allan Gwynne-Jones CBE DSO RA (27 March 1892 – 5 August 1982) was an English painter.

Gwynne-Jones was born in Richmond, Surrey. He was educated at Bedales School and then qualified as a solicitor, but never practised. He instead developed a love of art and began painting watercolours. In 1914 he began a course at the Slade School of Fine Art, but three months later was commissioned into the Welsh Guards Cheshire Regiment. He was wounded and awarded the Distinguished Service Order (DSO) at the Battle of the Somme in 1916. After demobilisation in 1919 he taught at the Royal College of Art where he became Professor of Painting between 1923 and 1930, when he resigned to join the staff of the Slade School of Fine Art. He continued teaching at the Slade until 1958, gaining renown for his own painting, most notably portraits and paintings of flowers.

Gwynne-Jones became a Royal Academician in 1956. He was appointed Commander of the Order of the British Empire (CBE) in 1980, two years before his death. Gwynne-Jones was married to the artist Rosemary Allan and lived in Eastleach Turville, Gloucestershire, their daughter, Emily Gwynne-Jones, also became an artist. A joint exhibition of works by the Gwynne-Jones family was held in 1997.
