= Salvador Ysart =

Scottish glassblower

Salvador Ysart (born 1878, Barcelona, Spain, d. 1955 Scotland) was a glassblower who came to work at the Moncrieff glassworks in Perth, Scotland, in 1922. With Marianne Isobel Moncreiffe, he designed and produced a range of art glassware called Monart .

== Life and career ==
Originally from Barcelona, Salvador worked at the Schneider Art Glass factory in France. In 1915 he moved to Scotland with his family where he was recruited to teach light bulb glassblowing at Leith Flint Glassworks in Edinburgh. In 1922 he moved to the Moncrieff glassworks in Perth, initially to make laboratory glassware with his eldest son Paul (1904–1991). Producing ‘friggers’ (hobby pieces) in their spare time, they were encouraged to produce art pieces. With Marianne Moncreiff providing designs, by 1924 a range of decorative glassware was produced under the name of Monart (from MONcrieff and YsART). By the 1930s, their pattern book contained a range of glasswares including vases, bowls, lampshades, candlesticks, scent bottles, ashtrays and paperweights and retailed at leading stores such as Liberty & Co. and Tiffany & Co.

Production of art glass at Moncrieff’s ceased during World War II. After the war, the Moncrieffs were reluctant to continue producing art glass, so in 1947, Salvador, with his younger sons Vincent and Augustine, set up Vasart Glass. Paul Ysart continued to work at Moncrieff, producing a limited range of Monart glass and paperweights till 1961, when art glass production finally ceased.

By the 1950s, Vasart was proving to be popular, but in 1955 Salvador died, followed a year later by Augustine. This left Vincent running the business on his own. Production declined through the late 1950s and in 1964, Vasart was taken over by Teachers Whisky (for whom they were making squashed whisky bottle ashtrays) and was rebranded as Strathearn Glass.

== Monart and Vasart ==
Monart and Vasart glass objects, such as paperweights, vases and dishes, are characterised by vibrant marbled colours combined with subtle hues and inclusions of mica flecks and bubbles. Their decorative and distinctive style has made such objects popular with collectors, many examples of which can be seen at the Perth Museum .
