= Janetta Gillespie =

British artist

- Born: 1 May 1876; Bonnybridge, Scotland
- Died: 10 October 1956 (aged 80); Bonnybridge, Scotland
- Education: Glasgow School of Art
- Known for: Painting

Janetta Susan Gillespie (1 May 1876– 10 October 1956) was a Scottish artist. Her still-life paintings were exhibited in Scotland and at the Walker gallery in Liverpool.

== Biography ==
Gillespie was born in Bonnybridge in Stirlingshire into a family of artists. Both her brother, Alexander Gillespie and her younger sister Floris were also artists and the three would sometimes exhibit together.

Gillespie attended the Glasgow School of Art in 1913 and then again from 1915 to 1917. She taught for a time at Bonnybridge School and lived in the town throughout her life. She mostly painted flowers and still life pieces in an often bold and dashing style with a highly accomplished use of chiaroscuro. A still life, Moon Pennies, received good reviews when shown at the Royal Scottish Watercolour Society in 1952. Gillespie exhibited with, and joined, the Glasgow Society of Women Artists, winning their Lauder Award in 1934. She also exhibited with the Royal Scottish Academy, the Royal Scottish Watercolour Society, the Glasgow Institute of the Fine Arts, at the Walker Art Gallery in Liverpool and with the Aberdeen Artists Society.
