= Floris Gillespie =

Scottish artist (1882–1967)

- Born: 1882; Bonnybridge, Scotland
- Died: 1967 (aged 84–85); Edinburgh, Scotland
- Education: Glasgow School of Art
- Known for: Painting

Floris Mary Gillespie (1882–1967) was a Scottish watercolour painter and teacher.

== Biography ==
Gillespie was born in Bonnybridge in Stirlingshire into an artistic family. Her brother, Alexander Bryson Gillespie and her sister Janetta also became artists and later, the three siblings would sometimes exhibit works together.

Gillespie attended the Glasgow School of Art from 1913 to 1915 and then taught at Stranraer High School. She mostly painted flowers and still life compositions and, occasionally, landscapes in both oils and watercolours. Gillespie joined the Glasgow Society of Women Artists in 1928 and won their Lauder Award in 1948. She also exhibited with the Royal Scottish Academy, the Royal Scottish Watercolour Society and on a regular basis with the Glasgow Institute of the Fine Arts. Gillespie lived in her native Bonnybridge for most of her life but died in Edinburgh.
