= Eileen Lawrence =

Scottish artist

Eileen Lawrence (born 1946) is a Scottish artist.

Eileen Lawrence was born in 1946 and studied at the Edinburgh College of Art (1963–68). Her first solo exhibition was at the 57 Gallery in Edinburgh in 1969.

Her work is in the permanent collection of the Tate Gallery and Ulster Museum.
