= Androbius =

Ancient Greek painter

Androbius was a painter of classical antiquity, whose time and country are unknown. He painted Scyllis, the diver, cutting away the anchors of the Persian fleet.
