= Eugenio de Arriba =

Spanish painter (1934–1977)

- Born: Eugenio de Arriba; March 4, 1934; Villafranca del Bierzo
- Died: March 16, 1977 (aged 43)
- Education: San Fernando School of Fine Arts, Madrid
- Known for: Painting, drawing
- Website: eugeniodearriba.com

Eugenio de Arriba (4 March 1934 – 16 March 1977) was a Spanish painter.

== Biography ==
=== Early life ===
de Arriba was born in 1934 in Villafranca del Bierzo, Spain. In his childhood, he started painting with multicoloured chalks on the pavements of his little village. He was already a great observer and his sketching was outstanding for his age. He was very determined of his purpose already as a young child. Once he was asked: "What will you be doing later on?" and Eugenio's answer was: "I want to paint but with a fine pencil"- an artist in the making.

Eugenio's early life was, however, not always easy. His father died when Eugenio was 8 years old, and he had to live with his mother and family in Ponferrada, the biggest town nearby. Through his teenage years his passion for art grew and at the age of fifteen he entered San Fernando School of Fine Arts in Madrid. Among his school mates were Lucio Munoz, Antonio Lopez, Pousa and Nicolas Solana.

=== Life in France ===
Eugenio graduated in 1955 and that same year he went to Paris where he met Chloe and married her in 1958. A year after their son was born. Eugenio's first exhibition in Paris was in the Ror Wolmar Gallery, Rue du Faubourg Saint-Honoré in 1959. As he always combined his love for painting with music, he performed with Paco Ibáriez in the "Homage to Picasso" in Vallauris (French Riviera). After a few years in the south France, he came back to his native Villafranca, where he portrays the villagers and paints many pastel landscapes.

From 1973 to 1976, he went on exhibiting in La Coruña, Lugo, Santiago de Compostela, Pontecedra and Orense. Then in Paris "Au Salon D’automne" in Nice in "Gallery Anne de Francony" and in Montecarlo in "The Michelange Gallery". The last exhibitions were made in Villafranca, Ponferrada, Burgos, Vitoria, Santader, Palencia, Venecia and Cagnes s’mer. His works, mainly pastels, were sold all over Europe and South America from 1955 to 1976.

=== Important years ===
There are three important years in the last part of Eugenio's life:

1966 After a serve illness of their son Diego. The young couple spent a few months in the mountains if Galicia, in a Celtic village (O cebreiro), where Eugenio found great inspiration painting the peasants, their customs and landscapes.

1967 Life in Madrid where both he and Chloe run an art shop and small gallery. In that meantime, he participated in several collective exhibitions.

1971 Chloe and Eugenio separated and alike the "eternal roamer", he went back France and eventually met Eliane Gullaume also a painter with whom he was to share his life until the end.

Eugenio died at the age of 43 on March 16, 1977.

== Personality ==
Eugenio was an artist in several aspects of his life. Besides painting he also played the guitar in Spanish and South American folklore. As a person His figurative work was influenced by rural communities and peasants, as well as the iconography of circus clowns, exploring the tension between comic facades and underlying sorrow.

== Inspiration ==
Eugenio de Arriba was inspired by the famous painters Pierre Bonnard and Claude Monet at this point especially for their colors mauves, greyish, pinks and blues. He would stand for hours in ‘Orangerie’ in Paris watching Monet's ‘Nympheas’. Eugenio was also truly inspired by Monet's pastel technique and painted most of his guaches in this period of time. Another inspiration for Eugenio was Henri Matisse who was a master of guache composition. Eugenio was at the point so impressed with Matisse that he was afraid he would not live long enough to gain the same serenity in his art as Matisse had with his. Eugenio preferred pastels because they would bring out the harmony and beauty in his art which he desired.

=== Style ===
An important characteristic element of Eugenio's art is the strong contrastive colors with the diagonal and contrary angles to enforce the color. When it comes to his perception of landscapes and buildings his art is full of temper, and the objects are sensed through a sensitive and receiving mind. In general all of his art has intense nerve that truly reflects the artist's state of mind.
