= Rosemary Allan =

British painter (1911–2008)

- Born: 1911; Bromley, Kent, England
- Died: 2008 (aged 96–97)
- Education: Central School of Arts and Crafts; Slade School of Art
- Known for: Painting

Rosemary Elizabeth Allan (1911–2008) was an English painter.

== Biography ==
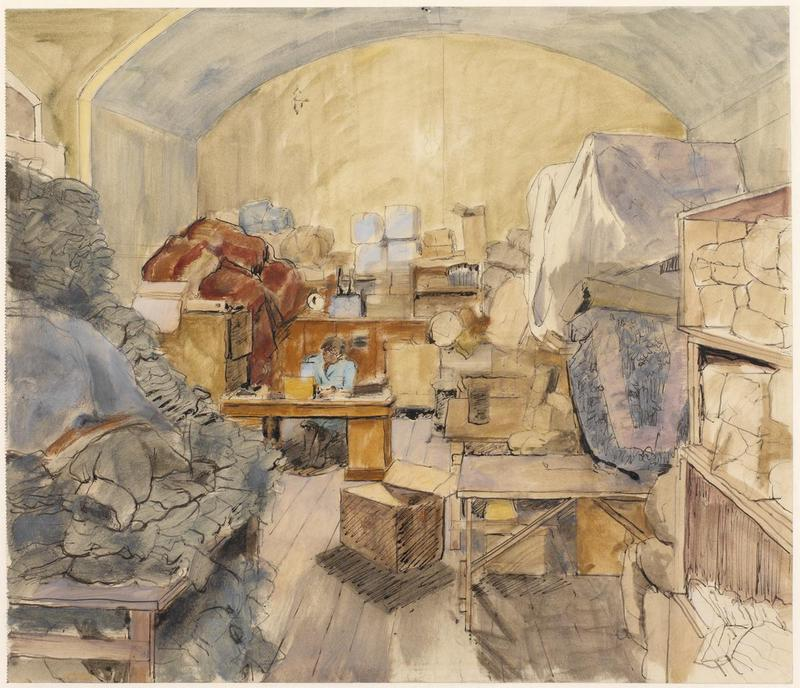
WVS Clothing Store, Bristol (Art.IWM ART LD 5171) (1945)

Allan was born in Bromley in Kent and attended the Central School of Arts and Crafts in 1928. She became a student at the Slade School of Fine Art in 1930 and would spend five years there. At the Slade she was taught by Randolph Schwabe and was awarded a scholarship in 1932. During a long career Allan showed works at the Royal Academy and with both the New English Art Club and the London Group. She had exhibitions at several commercial galleries including the Leicester Galleries, the Redfern Galleries and with the Wildenstein group. During World War Two, Allan worked for the Women's Voluntary Service, WVS, in Fairford, Gloucestershire, on evacuee settlement duties. Before the War ended, she completed a number of short-term commissions for the War Artists' Advisory Committee on the work of the WVS and the resulting watercolours are now held by the Imperial War Museum in London. A solo exhibition of her work was held at the Upper Grosvenor Galleries in 1971.

== Personal life ==
Allan lived in Eastleach, Gloucestershire and was married to the artist Allan Gwynne-Jones, their daughter, Emily Gwynne-Jones, also became an artist. An exhibition of works by the Gwynne-Jones family was held in 1997.
