= Mary E. Pollitt =

Scottish painter (1873–1962)

- Born: Mary Ellen Morrison; 9 August 1873; Laurencekirk, Kincardineshire, Scotland
- Died: 6 November 1962 (aged 89); Currie, Midlothian, Scotland
- Education: Slade School of Fine Art; Yellow Door School of Art
- Known for: Oils and watercolour; landscape, still life, travel subjects
- Spouse: Charles Stanley Pollitt (m. 1913)

Still Life with Red Hat, oil on canvas, private collection

Mary Ellen Pollitt (née Morrison; 9 August 1873 – 6 November 1962) was a Scottish painter working in oils and watercolour, creating landscape, still life, and travel subjects.

Pollitt trained at the Slade School of Fine Art in London and at the Yellow Door School of Art under Frank Spenlove-Spenlove, and went on to exhibit at British and international venues. Peter McEwan's Dictionary of Scottish Art and Architecture records her training as being in London and Paris.

== Early life ==
Mary Ellen Morrison was born on 9 August 1873 in Laurencekirk, Kincardineshire, Scotland. Her father was the Reverend Charles Morrison MA (1828–1890), minister of Laurencekirk, who served as a military chaplain in India. Her mother was Jane Green (1840–1879). Mary's brother was William Stalkartt Morrison (1876–1964).

In the 1901 census Mary Morrison is listed as "living on own means" in the household of Hugh Stalkartt in Dover, Kent, and in 1911 as a visitor at the household of Marmaduke William Stalkartt in Willesden, Middlesex.

In the fourth quarter of 1913, she married Charles Stanley Pollitt (1888–1965) at Chelsea, London.

== Early career: London and Italy ==
Pollitt's 1916 Royal Academy work was an oil titled A god and some flowers. The exhibition catalogue lists her name as "Morrison, M. (Miss)" and her address at Via Giovanni Prati 23, Florence. Her husband was also in this exhibition, with his entry in the catalogue giving a Cook and Son forwarding address in Florence. The 1926 Revue moderne article lists her exhibition history at that date as the Royal Academy, the Walker Gallery, and, in Italy, the Biennale of Milan and Padua.

In May 1925 she exhibited a painting at the II Mostra Internazionale dell'Acquerello at the Palazzo della Permanente, Milan, listed as "Maria Pollitt Morrison". Her former teacher Spenlove-Spenlove exhibited in the same show. In the following year "Mary Pollitt Morrison" exhibited a watercolour, La Chiesa (The Church) in the Open International Section (Mostra Internazionale) of the 15th Venice Biennale (Esposizione Internazionale d'Arte della Città di Venezia), and in early 1927 she exhibited three works at the Mostra primaverile (Spring Exhibition) at the Palazzo della Permanente, Milan, listed as "Mary Morrison Pollitt".

== Edinburgh career (1931–1954) ==
Pollitt had a professional studio at 50 Queen Street, Edinburgh New Town, from at least 1935 to 1956. She was a Council member of the Scottish Society of Women Artists from at least 1936, re-elected in 1941, and was elected Professional Member of the Society of Scottish Artists in November 1938. Peter McEwan's Dictionary of Scottish Art and Architecture (1994) records 21 appearances at the Royal Scottish Academy, 17 at the Royal Scottish Society of Painters in Watercolour, 20 at the Royal Glasgow Institute of Fine Arts, five at the Aberdeen Artists' Society, and two at the Society of Women Artists, London.

Across her career, Pollitt had more than 90 documented exhibition appearances. At her 1934 appearance at the Outlook Club the reviewer noted her range and versatility across oils, watercolours, and crayon. Penguins, which appeared at her solo show at Walker's Galleries in 1938, sold at the 1940 SSWA. She exhibited Air Warden, a wartime figure subject, at the 1941 SSA. Old Houses, Honfleur sold at the 1944–45 RGI winter exhibition, in a show that included works by Laura Knight, Joan Eardley, and William MacTaggart. Her Elgin Cathedral interior at the 1945 RSW was praised as 'a refreshing change'.

From 5 to 18 May 1938, Pollitt held a solo commercial exhibition titled Morocco, Germany, France & Scotland at Walker's Galleries, 118 New Bond Street, London. The exhibition's reviewer described her as "a constant exhibitor at the leading galleries".

Other venues where Pollitt exhibited include the Edinburgh Outlook Club, where she was a regular exhibitor between 1932 and 1949, the Aberdeen Artists' Society, Paisley Art Institute, the Society of Women Artists, London, and a group exhibition with the Raeburn Studio Painters.

== Critical reception ==
The 1926 Revue moderne des arts et de la vie described her as une paysagiste vivement sensible (a keenly sensitive landscape painter) with a wide vision, a true sense of colour, and a rare delicacy of nuance; her Venice watercolours were praised as full of depth and relief. In 1963, the Scottish poet and critic Sydney Goodsir Smith, reviewing the posthumous exhibition in The Scotsman, described Pollitt as painting "in the old-fashioned, traditional water-colour style of the last century", a characterisation he offered "simply descriptively and not at all disparagingly".

== Later life ==
Pollitt's last known documented exhibition appearance was at the Royal Glasgow Institute Annual Exhibition in 1955.

A death register entry for Mary Ellen Pollitt, aged 89, records her death on 6 November 1962 at Currie, Midlothian.

== Posthumous exhibition ==
A posthumous exhibition of 27 watercolours, described as "mostly landscape", was held at the Gateway Theatre Gallery, Edinburgh, opening in early February and running to 26 February 1963. Works were already selling by the time of Sydney Goodsir Smith's review in The Scotsman on 7 February.

== Sources ==
- Baile de Laperrière, Charles (ed.). The Royal Scottish Academy Exhibitors 1826–1990. Calne: Hilmarton Manor Press, 1991. 4 vols.
- De Sabbata, Massimo. Art Exhibitions in Milan in the 1920s: From the Origins of the Twentieth Century to the First Trade Union Exhibitions (1920–1929). Turin/London/Venice/New York: Allemandi, 2013. ISBN 9788842221869.
- McEwan, Peter J. M. Dictionary of Scottish Art and Architecture. Woodbridge: Antique Collectors' Club, 1994. (Available at Internet Archive.)
- Walker's Monthly, May 1938: "Morocco and Elsewhere". National Art Library, Victoria and Albert Museum, London.
