= Marion Ancrum =

British artist

Marion Ancrum (fl. 1885–1919), later Marion Turnbull, was a Scottish watercolour artist known for her paintings of Edinburgh street scenes.

== Biography ==
Ancrum was an Edinburgh-based artist who specialised in paintings of landscapes and domestic interiors. She produced numerous watercolours of Old Town street scenes, three of which are now in the City Art Centre, Edinburgh. She was a frequent exhibitor with the Royal Scottish Watercolour Society and also, on occasion, with the Royal Academy in London, the Royal Scottish Academy, the Royal Glasgow Institute of the Fine Arts and the Aberdeen Artists Society.
