= Sylvia Benton =

British classical archaeologist

Sylvia Benton FSA, FSAS
- Born: 18 August 1887; Lahore, British India
- Died: 12 September 1985 (aged 98); Inverness, Scotland

Academic background
- Education: University of Cambridge

Academic work
- Discipline: Classical Archaeology

Sylvia Benton FSA, FSA Scot (18 August 1887 – 12 September 1985) was a British classical archaeologist, best known for her work on ancient Greece and the Sculptor's Cave in Moray, Scotland. Benton was elected a Fellow of the Society of Antiquaries of Scotland in 1928 and a Fellow of the Society of Antiquaries in London in 1937.

== Early life and education ==
Benton was born 18 August 1887 in India at Lahore. At the time, her father, Alexander Hay Benton, was a judge of the Chief Court of India. Her mother was Jane Rose from Moray, Scotland. They arrived in India in 1864 and had four children, a son William and three daughters, Mary, Rose and Sylvia, who was the youngest. For health reasons Judge Benton left India in 1894 and settled at Polmont (Stirlingshire). After the death of his wife in 1901 the family moved to Wimbledon, so Sylvia attended both St Margaret's Primary School in Polmont, Scotland and Wimbledon High School in London. From 1907 to 1910, Benton attended Girton College, Cambridge, studying the Classics. She represented Cambridge women and Girton College in hockey. Her tutor was Katharine Jex-Blake. She gained only a low second class in her final Tripos in 1910, and it has been suggested that she, in some way, "got across" Jex-Blake, because of how strongly-minded she could be.

After Cambridge, she taught high school in Manchester and returned to Cambridge to gain a Teachers Training Certificate. Thereafter, she held teaching posts in schools at Oldham, Reading and Clapham for fifteen years. During this time she developed an interest in classical archeology and the study of Homer.

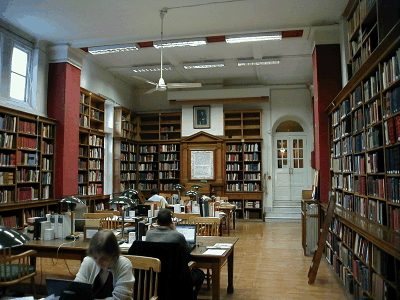
The British School at Athens library

Benton travelled throughout Greece in 1926. In 1927 to 1928 she was a student at the British School at Athens and assisted archeologist and school instructor, Walter Abel Heurtley, with excavations in Chalkidiki in Northern Greece. Benton was turned down for the 1928–1929 term at the school, because she had disobeyed an order from the school's Director not to climb the Taygetus mountains alone. She continued to assist Heurtley in his excavations in 1929. Benton was accepted at the School of Athens for the 1929-1930 school term. She participated in excavations with Heurtley in Macedonia and Servia in 1930, and Armenochori in 1931.

She continued to travel throughout Greece, often accompanying archaeologists, including Ralegh Radford and John Pendlebury. With support from Professor J. L. Myres, she was accepted by Lady Margaret Hall, at Oxford, in January 1929, to study for the Diploma in Classical Archaeology, which she obtained in 1930. Later, in 1934, she went on to acquire a B. Litt. with the dissertation, the Barony of Odysseus.

== Career ==
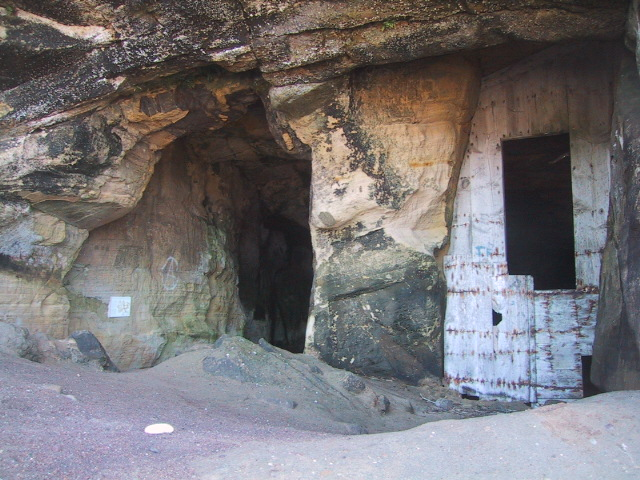
Sculptors Cave, Covesea, Lossiemouth

From 1928 to 1930, she excavated the Sculptor's Cave at Covesea on the south shore of Moray Firth. She had travelled to examine the Pictish carvings but found ‘the floor was strewn with human bones’ which caused her to organize an excavation. She discovered evidence of human occupation dating to the Bronze Age, the late Roman Iron Age, and the medieval period. Uncovering layers of sand on the floor of the cave, Benton found human remains, burnt deposits in the soil and evidence of ancient stone hearths. Her methods were cutting edge for that time:

“the sieving of every bucket/spadeful of deposit was remarkable for its time in Scotland, as was the amount of horizontal control she exercised through her grid.” - Ian A. G. Shepherd

However, much the human remains has since been lost. Of the 1,600 bone fragments recovered by Benton, today just seven survive in the collections of National Museums Scotland and Elgin Museum.

A large quantity of artefacts were uncovered that provided evidence of the dates of human occupation of the cave from the Late Bronze Age to the medieval period. She later determined that Bronze Age artefacts found in the cave were similar to objects found in Central Europe during the same time period. In a report to the Scottish Society of Antiquaries in 1931, she proposed that the human occupants at the site had immigrated from Central Europe, which was contrary to the views of the Scottish Antiquarian community. Thirty years later, her views were widely accepted and the 'Covesea phase' was recognised as a significant time period of the Late Bronze Age in Scotland. Benton was elected as a Fellow of the Society of Antiquaries of Scotland in 1928.

Benton returned to Greece in 1930 and assisted in excavations under the direction of Huertley at Ithaca from 1930 to 1932 and in 1934. She also participated in the excavation of a cave at Astakos in 1932, which she discovered, and Zakynthos with Hilda Lorimer in 1934. After Heurtley's retirement from the school in 1937, Benton began excavating on her own in North Ithaca, at Tris Langades, from 1937 to 1938. She returned to excavate at the Aeots in 1938. She first excavated a cave, where work began underwater as the cave’s floor had been submerged by the rise in sea-level. However, Sylvia quickly realised that it was a stratified site, so pumps were installed. The finds established continuity of use from Mycenaean through the Dark Age to late classical times. The excavations uncovered the remains of 12 bronze tripod-lebetes, dating from the 9th and 8th centuries BC and terracottas with dedications to the Nymphs and to Odysseus. She continued to analyse those finds at the Vathy museum in Ithaca for several years and published several articles on her work. These bronze artefacts led to her many studies on ancient bronzes, like the unpublished bronzes from Palaikastro and Praisos. Early in her career described herself as a prehistorian but this work extended her topics of coverage to the geometric and later periods.

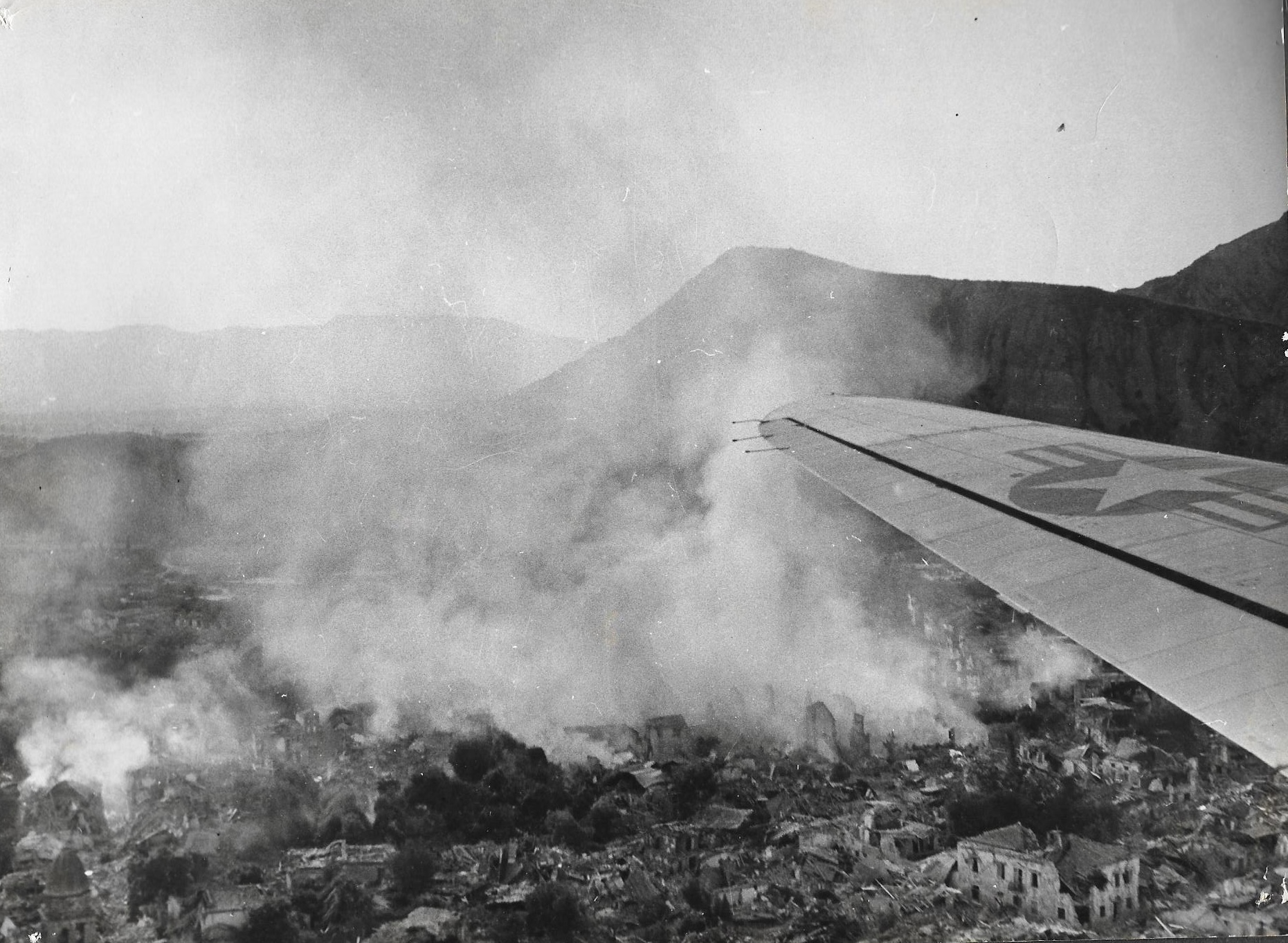
Aerial view of destruction in Kefalonia after the 1953 earthquake

Sylvia moved back to England late in August 1939 at the beginning of the second World War and found war work in London, initially for Naval Hydrography. There she collaborating in creating a 'Gazetteer of Greece' and a 'Glossary of Modern Greek', and then in Postal and Telegraph Censorship (Uncommon Languages Dept.). At night, she worked with London's fire-fighting brigade. Benton was badly injured in the bombing of London in 1945. By the spring of 1947, with the war over, she was able to return to Greece and work at the Vathy museum in Ithaca. The 1953 Ionian earthquake devastated the islands, killed several hundred people and destroyed many buildings. Arriving in Ithaca on a Greek minesweeper after the 1953 earthquake she is stated to have dived into the water from the deck in order to be the first person ashore; she was 66 years old at that time. After the earthquake, Benton participated in the restoration of the museums at Vathy and Stavros. During this time period, she divided her time between Ithaca and her home in Oxford, England.

In the 1950s, Sylvia focused her research on the themes of monsters, winds, and birds in Greek art and literature. She authored several publications on the topics, but her work of twelve years on birds was not accepted for publication. As late as 1965 she was still working with and taking BSA students to Ithaca. When Benton had completed her work at the Sculptor's Cave in 1930, she left behind a number of undisturbed deposits and artefacts on the floor of the cave for future archaeologists. Fifty years later in 1979, Benton returned to the cave during its excavation by archaeologists Ian and Alexandra Shepherd, to retrieve the remaining artefacts. Benton, at the age of 92, climbed down a high scaffolding on the cliff face above the cave to view the progress of the excavation by the archeological team.

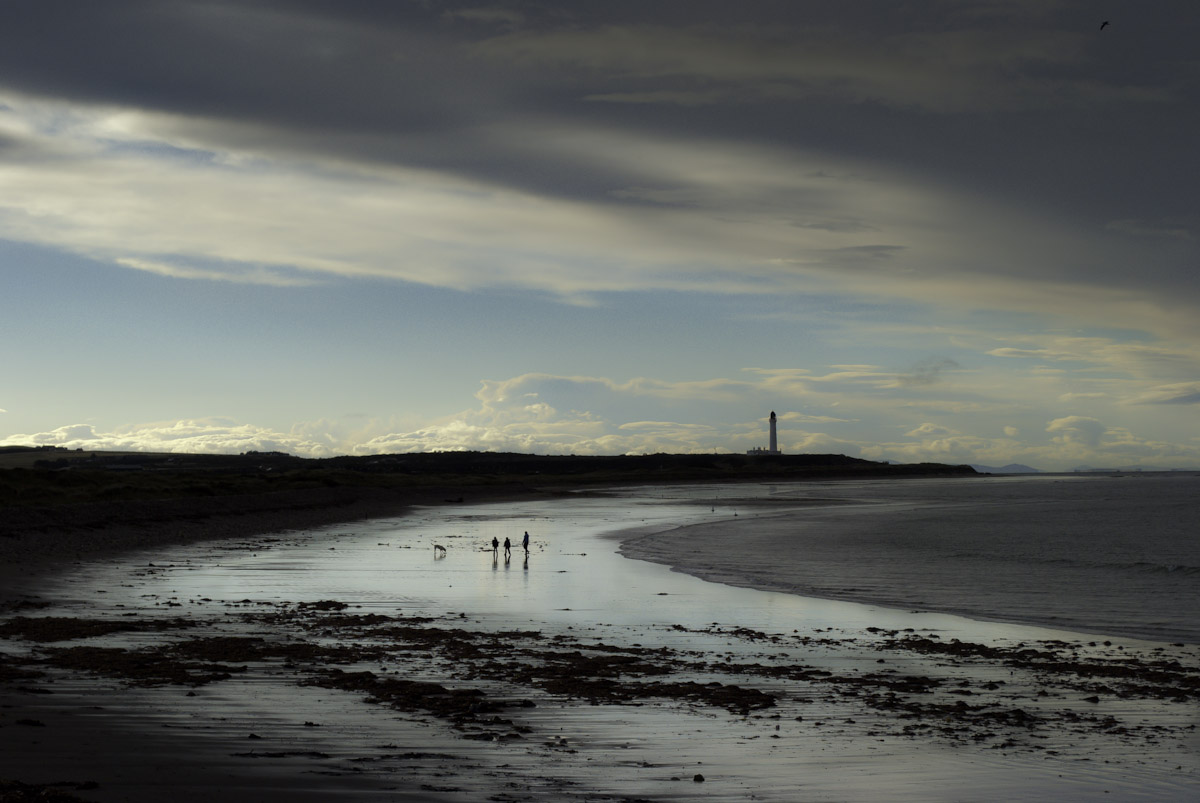
Lossiemouth West Beach

Benton moved to Lossiemouth, Moray in 1970 when she retired, and later to Kincraig in 1984, where her family was located. She was the Honorary Curator of the Elgin Museum, during her retirement in Lossiemouth. She still held the excavation pemits for Ithaca decades later and archaeologists wanting to excavate there had to travel up to Scotland to get them from her in her retirement. In her later years, she worked on a book about birds, but because of failing eyesight, she could not complete it. From April 1984 she was cared for by her great-niece, Mrs Elizabeth Neill. The obituary in the Annals of the British School of Athens described her in her final years as,

"a 'good trencher-woman' — meat and drink agreed with her; and she was taking her daily walk until the end. Though deaf she could recall the old days and was telling amusing stories of them when visited two months before her death."

After a fall, she died in hospital (Note: One source says Inverness while another says Aberdeen) on 12 September 1985, at the age of 98. Here personal papers are archived with the British School at Athenes.

== Personality ==
'In archaeology for half a century she saw what she wanted to do and did it well; not least, she enjoyed doing it.'

She was known for the bizarreness of her clothes, for that time, and her fierceness, having fought off two known attackers in her lifetime, once in Greece and once in her 90s, in her bedroom at Lossiemouth. After that attack, she was in hospital for a while, with a broken arm, but upon being discharged, she visited the new excavation at Covesea, climbing down 30m of scaffolding and returning up it so fast that the rope-holders could not keep pace. Such feats of athleticism were common for her. After dancing on board HMS Resolution, during the Mediterranean Fleet's summer cruise, she persuaded the commander to 'swing her out' so that she could inspect a cave in a cliff at Argostoli, and the hairpin bend on the road in Ithaca used to be known as 'Benton's Push', though Sylvia disputed this last point. She would swim across Polis Bay, twice, every evening after work at Stavros.

She never completed her book on birds when her eyesight was failing because she refused to wear glasses, saying, “they will make people think me effete”. This stubbornness was common for her. In 1937, after forgetting her passport, she had the French authorities stamp her Peloponnesian railway card instead.

Helen Waterhouse's article on her said,

"Sylvia prided herself on a hard-bitten no-nonsense exterior. Her Athens hairdresser complained that he was expected to cut her hair “as if round a pudding basin.”

and

"Her, justified, sense of self-worth on occasion made her over-ready to detect slights where none was intended, and encouraged the fabrication, and elaboration, of legends about her referred to by John Cook."

The British School of Athens article on her stated, 'People could find her too impatient and at times even exasperating; but to some she was very dear.'

== Selected publications ==
- 1928 "Antiquities from Thiaki", BSA 29, 113–116.
- 1931 "The Ionian Islands", BSA 32, 213–246. "The Excavation of the Sculptor’s Cave, Covesea, Morayshire", Proc. Soc. Ant. Soc. 65, 177–216. "An unlucky sword from Mycenae", Geographical Journal.
- 1935 "Excavations at Ithaca III, The Cave at Polis, 1" BSA 35, 45–73.
- 1937 "Herakles and Eurystheus at Knossos", JHS 57, 38–43.
- 1939 "Excavations at Ithaca III; The cave at Polis, 2" BSA 39, 1–51.
- 1949 "Second thoughts on "Mycenaean" pottery in Ithaca", BSA 44, 307–312.
- 1950 "The dating of Horses on Stands and Spectacle fibulae in Greece", JHS 70, 16–22.
- 1952 "The Pelynt Sword-Hilt", Proceedings of the Prehistoric Society 18 (2), 237 - 238
- 1953 "Further Excavations at Aetos", BSA 48, 255–358.
- 1959 "The Cup of Arkesilas", Archaeology 12, 3, 178–82.
- 1961 "Cattle egrets and bustards in Greek art", JHS 81, 42–55.
- 1970 "Nereids and two Attic pyxides", JHS 90, 193–194.
