= Sculptor's Cave =

Cave and archaeological site in Moray, Scotland

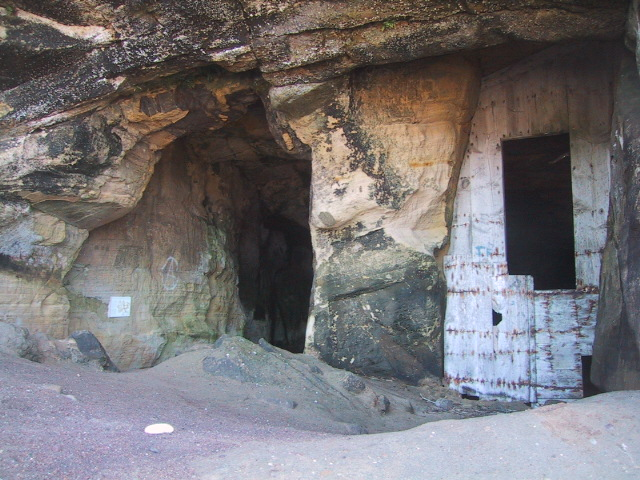
- Twin entrances to the Sculptor's Cave
- Interactive map of Sculptor's Cave
- 57.7187°N 3.3864°W
- Type: Cave
- Location: Covesea, Moray, Scotland

History
- Built: c. 500-700

Site notes
- Public access: Yes

Scheduled monument
- Official name: Sculptor's Cave
- Type: Prehistoric domestic and defensive: cave
- Designated: 24 October 1979
- Reference no.: SM4220

The Sculptor's Cave is a sandstone cave on the south shore of the Moray Firth in Scotland, near the small settlement of Covesea, between Burghead and Lossiemouth in Moray. It is named after the Pictish carvings incised on the walls of the cave near its entrances. There are seven groups of carvings dating from the 6th or 7th century, including fish, crescent and V-rod, pentacle, triple oval, step, rectangle, disc and rectangle, flower, and mirror patterns, some very basic but others more sophisticated.

The cave is 20m deep and 13.5m wide with a 5.5m high roof and can be entered by two parallel 11m long passages, each 2-3m wide. It lies at the base of 30m high cliffs and is largely inaccessible at high tide.

The cave was first excavated between 1928 and 1930 by Sylvia Benton, who discovered evidence of two main periods of activity on the site: the first during the late Bronze Age, and the second during the late Roman Iron Age, between the 2nd and 4th centuries AD.
