= Duchess of Atholl =

Duchess of Atholl is a title given to the wife of the Duke of Atholl, an extant title in the Peerage of Scotland held by the head of Clan Murray and created by Queen Anne in 1703. The current Duchess is Charmaine Myrna du Toit, who married Bruce Murray, 12th Duke of Atholl in 2009.

== Duchesses of Atholl ==
Name	Birth	Marriage	Became Duchess of Atholl	Spouse	Death	Ceased being Duchess of Atholl	Reason ceased being Duchess
Lady Catherine Hamilton	24 October 1662	24 May 1683	30 June 1703	John Murray, 1st Duke of Atholl	11 January 1707		Died
Mary Ross	26 December 1688	26 June 1710		John Murray, 1st Duke of Atholl	17 January 1767	14 November 1724	Husband's death
Jane Frederick	1693	28 April 1726		James Murray, 2nd Duke of Atholl	13 June 1748		Died
Jean Drummond	1725	7 May 1749		James Murray, 2nd Duke of Atholl	22 February 1795	8 January 1764	Husband's death
Lady Charlotte Murray	13 October 1731	23 October 1753	8 January 1764	John Murray, 3rd Duke of Atholl	13 October 1805	5 November 1774	Husband's death
Jane Cathcart	20 May 1754	26 December 1774		John Murray, 4th Duke of Atholl	5 December 1790		Died
Margery Forbes	3 February 1761	11 March 1794		John Murray, 4th Duke of Atholl	3 October 1842	29 September 1830	Husband's death
Anne Home-Drummond	17 June 1814	29 October 1839	14 September 1846	George Murray, 6th Duke of Atholl	22 May 1897	16 January 1864	Husband's death
Louisa Moncreiffe	11 June 1844	29 October 1863	16 January 1864	John Stewart-Murray, 7th Duke of Atholl	8 July 1902		Died
Katharine Ramsay	6 November 1874	20 July 1899	20 January 1917	John Stewart-Murray, 8th Duke of Atholl	21 October 1960	16 March 1942	Husband's death
Margaret Leach	8 July 1935	15 December 1956	27 February 1996	John Murray, 11th Duke of Atholl	Alive	15 May 2012	Husband's death
Charmaine Myrna du Toit	Unknown	2009		Bruce Murray, 12th Duke of Atholl	Incumbent		

== Wives who did not become Duchess of Atholl ==
- Lynne Elizabeth Andrew married Bruce Murray, 12th Duke of Atholl in 1984 and they divorced in 2009. Therefore, Lynne never became Duchess, as Bruce only became the Duke in 2012.

== Unmarried Dukes of Atholl ==
- John Murray, 5th Duke of Atholl never married and died childless Greville Place, St John's Wood, London, on 14 September 1846.
- James Stewart-Murray, 9th Duke of Atholl never married and died May 1957, aged 77.
- Iain Murray, 10th Duke of Atholl never married and died February 1996, aged 64.

== Ships ==
- RMS Duchess of Atholl, a Canadian Pacific ocean liner.
