= Joyce W. Cairns =

Scottish painter and printmaker

- Born: 1947 (age 78–79); Edinburgh, Scotland, United Kingdom
- Known for: Painting
- Elected: Member of Royal Scottish Academy
- Website: www.joycecairns.co.uk

Footdee Gospel Hall Studio Garden

Joyce W. Cairns is a Scottish painter and printmaker based in Broughty Ferry, Scotland. In 2018, she was elected president of the Royal Scottish Academy (RSA).

== Biography ==
Born in Edinburgh in 1947, Cairns was brought up in North East Scotland, where her father was a school master. In 1966, she went to Gray's School of Art in Aberdeen where she studied until 1970. She then took a Master of Art at the Royal College of Art in London from 1971 to 1974. This was followed by a fellowship at Gloucestershire College of Art and Design in Cheltenham. She went on to undertake a further period of study at Goldsmiths' College before returning to Aberdeen in 1976 to take up a teaching post at Gray’s School of Art. On returning to Aberdeen, she moved into the small fishing village of Footdee at the mouth of the harbour in Aberdeen. With small houses facing on to a square, the village is flanked on one side by the industrial harbour of Aberdeen, and the large boats that pass by the house often appear in her paintings.

In 1985, Cairns was elected an associate member of the Royal Scottish Academy, became a full member in 1998 and in 2018 was elected president of the Royal Scottish Academy of Art and Architecture (RSA), the first woman to hold the position in the Academy's history. From 1985 to 1988 she served as the first female president of the Aberdeen Artist’s Society. Cairns took early retirement from teaching in 2004 to focus completely on painting. She now lives in Broughty Ferry, a suburb of Dundee.

== Work ==
Cairns is a ‘figurative painter of great expressive power’. Her paintings express autobiographical and psychological themes. In the 1970s, mythology was a great influence in her work, but it has been the themes of family, war, and memory that have dominated since. In 2006, Aberdeen Art Gallery hosted a major exhibition entitled War Tourist, an exhibition that recounted the horrors of war in personal terms through her own family history and as a passive observer or war tourist. Cairns visited Tunisia, where her father saw active service, and later Bosnia and the concentration camps of Eastern Europe. The outcome of these travels and years of research were exhibited in 26 large paintings in Aberdeen Art Gallery. Cairns' painting style is rooted in Expressionism and uses iconography to express a narrative. Often working on a large scale, Cairns' preferred medium is oil on board and the artist uses a grid to plan out elements in a composition.

Cairns has work in public collections including, Aberdeen University, Robert Gordon University, Strathclyde University, Grampian Hospitals Trust, Perth and Kinross Council and Angus Council. She exhibits work in the Compass Gallery, Tatha Gallery in Newport-on-Tay and Kilmorack Gallery.

Her work has been written about in many publications including War Tourist and an interview with Janet Mackenzie in Studio International Contemporary Arts Magazine.
