= Aberdeen Artists Society =

The Aberdeen Artists Society was founded in 1827 and aims to raise awareness of contemporary visual arts in Aberdeen and the North of Scotland.

== History ==
The Aberdeen Artists' Society was founded in 1827 by local artists associated with Scottish painter James Giles and noted Scottish architect Archibald Simpson. Giles would become the President with Simpson presiding as Vice President. Having organised some exhibitions the society ceased activity at this point, however, by 1885 the society experienced a revival with the establishment of an annual exhibition at Aberdeen Art Gallery. These exhibitions would go on to become the Gallery's main activity until such time that they, themselves, could build up a permanent collection. These regular exhibitions would remain on an annual and bi-annual basis up until 1912 when exhibitions became sporadic. Notably, there were no exhibitions from 1920 to 1922 and again from 1938 to 1957, in 1939, notable artist and engraver Ian Fleming played a key role in the revival of the Society. From the early 1930s the Society listed their clubhouse as being 1 Bon Accord Square, Aberdeen.

The main aim of the society was and remains to facilitate "the Mutual improvement of Painting and the furtherance of Art in general in Aberdeen." Despite having re-invented itself many times over the past 187 years the society has resolutely remained true to its original aims, "the promotion of Art in the NorthEast of Scotland and the placing of Aberdeen as a culturally relevant centre for the arts."

The Society would establish three main rules:

1. To hold annual exhibitions
2. To facilitate the intercourse of those connected to and interested in Art
3. To promote the practical and theoretical study of art...through forming a collection of costumes and armour and by providing a library of art literature, and a studio for the use of members.

Today, the society consists of three levels of membership:

- Professional
- Ordinary
- Honorary

In total, they boast 540 members.

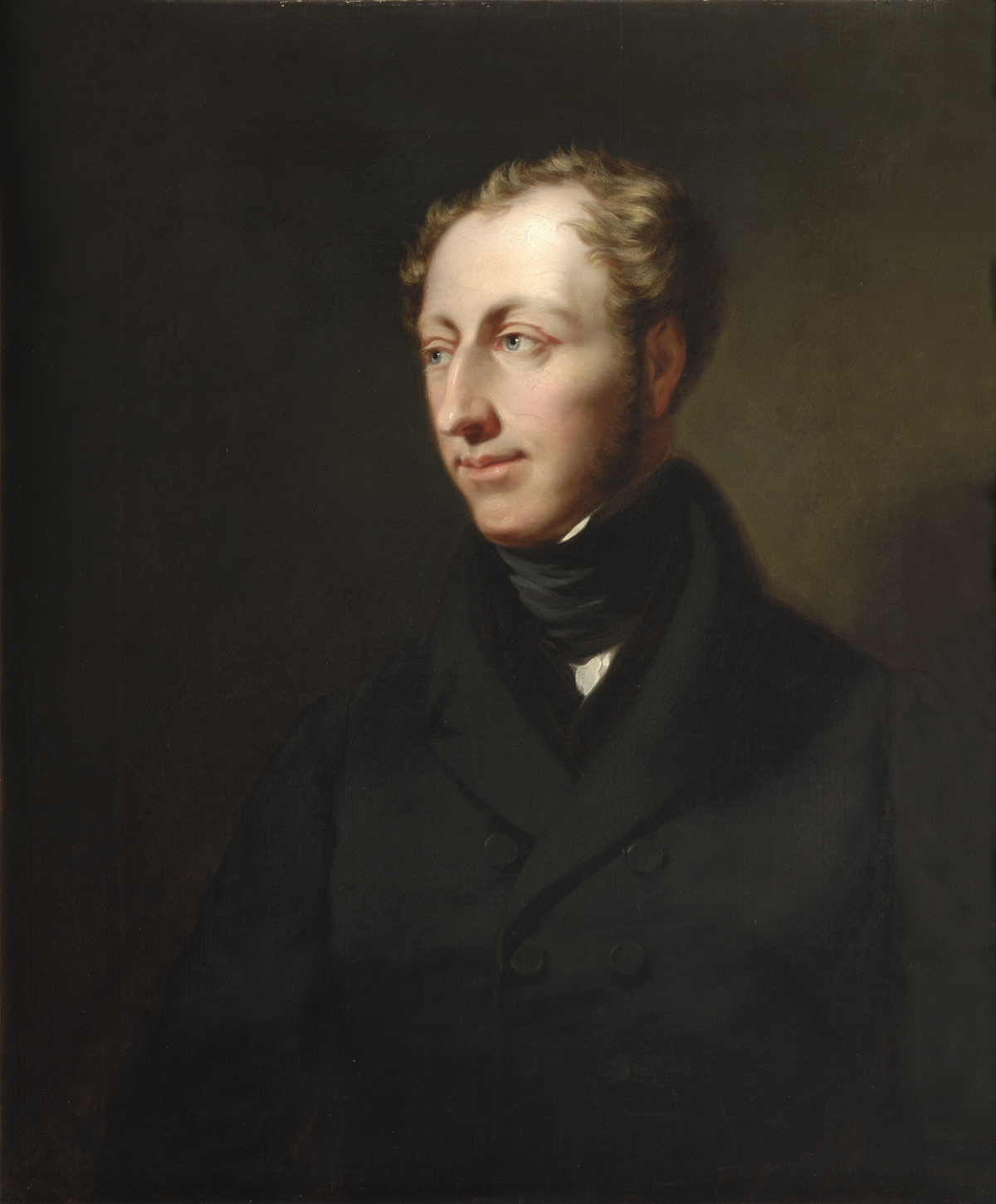
Portrait of Archibald Simpson by James Giles RSA (1801-1870)

== Notable exhibitors and artists ==
- Augustus John (1878-1961)
- Ian Fleming (1908-1964)
- Douglas Strachan (1875-1950)
- George Frampton (1860-1928)
- George Henry (painter) (1858-1943)
- James Pittendrigh Macgillivray (1856-1938)
- John Lavery (1856-1941)
- Joyce W. Cairns (born 1947)
- Robert Sivell (1888-1958)
- Stephen Shankland
- Walter Sickert (1860-1942)

== Publications ==
Particles of Light: A History of Aberdeen Artists' Society, 1927-2000 by John Morrison and Ian Baird.
